= List of bus routes in Singapore =

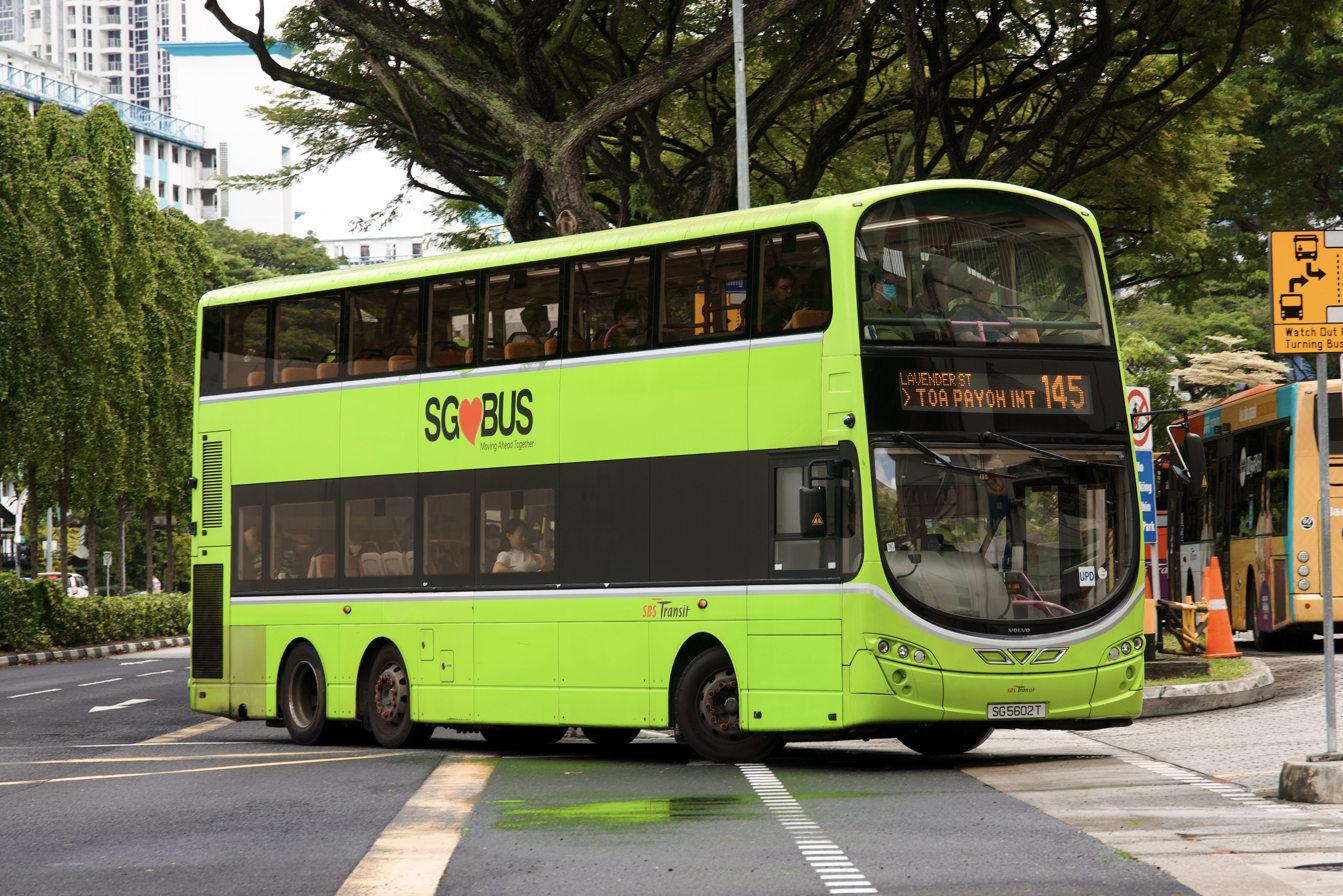
SBS Transit Wright Eclipse Gemini 2-bodied Volvo B9TL on Service 145 in May 2024

This is a list of bus routes in Singapore.

== Bus routes ==
=== Routes 2–99 ===
Route number	Origin	Destination	Service type	Operator	Package
2	Changi Village Bus Terminal	Kampong Bahru Bus Terminal	Trunk	Go-Ahead Singapore	Loyang
2B	Changi Village Bus Terminal	New Upper Changi Road (Bedok Station Exit A)	Short-trip	Go-Ahead Singapore	Loyang
3	Tampines Bus Interchange	Punggol Bus Interchange	Trunk	Go-Ahead Singapore	Loyang
3A (Note: Operates after 11.35pm on weekdays, 11.36pm on Saturdays, and 11.39pm on Sundays and public holidays, in place of departures of 3 from Tampines Bus Interchange.)	Tampines Bus Interchange	Pasir Ris Drive 12 (Block 747A)	Short-trip	Go-Ahead Singapore	Loyang
4	Tampines Bus Interchange	Changi North Way (loop)	Trunk	Go-Ahead Singapore	Tampines
5	Pasir Ris Bus Interchange	Bukit Merah Bus Interchange	Trunk	SBS Transit	Bukit Merah
5A (Note: Only operates on weekday mornings and evenings.)	Mariam Way (After Ballota Park)	Simei Street 3 (Before Changi General Hospital)	Short-trip	SBS Transit	Bukit Merah
5B (Note: Only operates on weekday evenings.)	Simei Street 3 (After Changi General Hospital)	Mariam Way (Before Mariam Walk)	Short-trip	SBS Transit	Bukit Merah
6	Pasir Ris Bus Interchange	Loyang Crescent (loop)	Trunk	Go-Ahead Singapore	Loyang
7	Bedok Bus Interchange	Clementi Bus Interchange	Trunk	SBS Transit	Clementi
7A	Bedok Bus Interchange	Orchard Boulevard (Orchard Station Exit 13)	Short-trip	SBS Transit	Clementi
7B	Clementi Bus Interchange	Orchard Road (Dhoby Ghaut Station)	Short-trip	SBS Transit	Clementi
8	Tampines Bus Interchange	Toa Payoh Bus Interchange	Trunk	SBS Transit	Bishan–Toa Payoh
9	Bedok Bus Interchange	Changi Airfreight Centre (loop)	Trunk	SBS Transit	Bedok
9A	Bedok Bus Interchange	Loyang Avenue (Block 149A)	Short-trip	SBS Transit	Bedok
9B (Note: Only operates on weekday mornings.)	Simei Street 3 (Simei Station)	Airport Cargo Road (3rd Cargo Agents)	Short-trip	SBS Transit	Bedok
10	Tampines Bus Interchange	Kent Ridge Bus Terminal	Trunk	Go-Ahead Singapore	Tampines
10e	Bedok Road	Shenton Way (After Straits Boulevard) (direction 1); Anson Road (Hub Synergy Point) (direction 2)	Express	Go-Ahead Singapore	Tampines
11	Lorong 1 Geylang Bus Terminal	Rhu Cross (loop)	Trunk	SBS Transit	Serangoon–Eunos
12	Pasir Ris Bus Interchange	Kampong Bahru Bus Terminal	Trunk	Go-Ahead Singapore	Loyang
12e	Pasir Ris Bus Interchange	Kampong Bahru Bus Terminal	Express	Go-Ahead Singapore	Loyang
13	Yio Chu Kang Bus Interchange	Upper East Coast Bus Terminal	Trunk	SBS Transit	Bedok
13A	Ang Mo Kio Avenue 6 (Block 307A)	Bishan Road (Bishan Station)	Short-trip	SBS Transit	Bedok
14	Bedok Bus Interchange	Clementi Bus Interchange	Trunk	SBS Transit	Bedok
14A (Note: Only operates on Sundays and public holidays.)	Bedok Bus Interchange	Grange Road (Somerset Youth Park)	Short-trip	SBS Transit	Bedok
14e	Bedok North Avenue 3	Orchard Road (Orchard Station/Lucky Plaza)	Express	SBS Transit	Bedok
15	Pasir Ris Bus Interchange	Marine Parade Road (loop)	Trunk	Go-Ahead Singapore	Loyang
15A	Pasir Ris Bus Interchange	Jalan Eunos (Opposite Eunos Station)	Short-trip	Go-Ahead Singapore	Loyang
16	Bedok Bus Interchange	Bukit Merah Bus Interchange	Trunk	SBS Transit	Bukit Merah
16M (Note: Does not operate on Sundays and public holidays.)	Bedok Bus Interchange	Bukit Merah Bus Interchange	Trunk (supplementary)	SBS Transit	Bukit Merah
17	Bedok Bus Interchange	Pasir Ris Bus Interchange	Trunk	Go-Ahead Singapore	Loyang
17A	Bedok Bus Interchange	Bedok North Avenue 4 (SBST Bedok North Depot)	Short-trip	Go-Ahead Singapore	Loyang
18	Tampines North Bus Interchange	Bedok North Avenue 4 (SBST Bedok North Depot)	Trunk	Go-Ahead Singapore	Tampines
18A	Tampines North Bus Interchange	Tampines Avenue 9 (Tampines East Station Exit D)	Short-trip	Go-Ahead Singapore	Tampines
18M (Note: Will be merged into 18 following the completion of road works.)	Bedok North Avenue 4 (Bedok North Bus Depot)	Tampines Street 96 (loop)	Trunk (supplementary)	SBS Transit	Bedok
19	Tampines Bus Interchange	Airport Cargo Road (loop)	Trunk	Go-Ahead Singapore	Tampines
20	Tampines Bus Interchange	Changi Business Park Avenue 3 (loop)	Trunk	Go-Ahead Singapore	Tampines
20A	Simei Street 1 (Block 148)	Changi South Avenue 1 (Expo Station Exit B)	Short-trip	Go-Ahead Singapore	Tampines
21	Pasir Ris Bus Interchange	Saint Michael's Bus Terminal	Trunk	SBS Transit	Bishan–Toa Payoh
21A	Geylang Road (Before Lorong 18 Geylang)	Kitchener Road (Before Tai Hoe Hotel)	Short-trip	SBS Transit	Bishan–Toa Payoh
22	Ang Mo Kio Bus Interchange	Eunos Bus Interchange	Trunk	SBS Transit	Serangoon–Eunos
23	Tampines Bus Interchange	Rochor Canal Road (loop)	Trunk	Go-Ahead Singapore	Tampines
24	Ang Mo Kio Bus Interchange	Changi Airport (loop)	Trunk	SBS Transit	Seletar
25	Ang Mo Kio Bus Interchange	Upper East Coast Bus Terminal	Trunk	SBS Transit	Bedok
26	Bedok Bus Interchange	Toa Payoh Bus Interchange	Trunk	SBS Transit	Bishan–Toa Payoh
27	Hougang Central Bus Interchange	Changi Airport (loop)	Trunk	SBS Transit	Sengkang–Hougang
27A	Sengkang East Avenue (Block 203B)	Tampines Avenue 4 (Opposite Century Square)	Short-trip	SBS Transit	Sengkang–Hougang
28	Tampines Bus Interchange	Toa Payoh Bus Interchange	Trunk	Go-Ahead Singapore	Tampines
29	Tampines Bus Interchange	Changi Village Bus Terminal (loop)	Trunk	Go-Ahead Singapore	Tampines
29A	Tampines Bus Interchange	Tampines Avenue 7 (Block 497D)	Short-trip	Go-Ahead Singapore	Tampines
30	Bedok Bus Interchange	Boon Lay Bus Interchange	Trunk	SBS Transit	Bedok
30e	Bedok Bus Interchange	Pasir Panjang Road	Express	SBS Transit	Bedok
31	Tampines Bus Interchange	Toa Payoh Bus Interchange	Trunk	Go-Ahead Singapore	Tampines
31A	Tampines Bus Interchange	New Upper Changi Road (Tanah Merah Station Exit 1)	Short-trip	Go-Ahead Singapore	Tampines
32	Bedok Bus Interchange	Buona Vista Bus Terminal	Trunk	SBS Transit	Clementi
33	Bedok Bus Interchange	Kent Ridge Bus Terminal	Trunk	SBS Transit	Clementi
33A	Kent Ridge Bus Terminal	Tiong Bahru Road (Block 1)	Short-trip	SBS Transit	Clementi
33B	Bedok Bus Interchange	Old Airport Road (Block 22)	Short-trip	SBS Transit	Clementi
34	Punggol Coast Bus Interchange	Changi Airport (loop)	Trunk	Go-Ahead Singapore	Loyang
34A	Punggol Coast Bus Interchange	Tampines Avenue 5 (Opposite Our Tampines Hub)	Short-trip	Go-Ahead Singapore	Loyang
34B	Tampines Avenue 10 (IKEA Tampines/After TPE)	Changi Airport (loop)	Short-trip	Go-Ahead Singapore	Loyang
35 (Note: Operates until 7.30pm on weekdays and 3pm on Saturdays. Does not operate when 35M is in operation.)	Bedok Bus Interchange	Alps Avenue (loop)	Trunk	SBS Transit	Bedok
35A	Bedok Bus Interchange	Tanah Merah Ferry Terminal	Short-trip	SBS Transit	Bedok
35M (Note: Operates from 7.45pm on weekdays and 3.15pm on Saturdays, and for the whole day on Sundays and public holidays. Does not operate when 35 is in operation.)	Bedok Bus Interchange	Tanah Merah Ferry Terminal (loop)	Trunk (supplementary)	SBS Transit	Bedok
36	Changi Airport	Tomlinson Road (loop)	Trunk	Go-Ahead Singapore	Loyang
36A (Note: Operates in place of 36 after 11.02pm on weekdays, 11.03pm on Saturdays, and 11.04pm on Sundays and public holidays.)	Changi Airport	Tomlinson Road (After Cuscaden Road)	Short-trip	Go-Ahead Singapore	Loyang
36B (Note: Only operates on weekdays.)	Marine Parade Road (Lagoon View) (start); Siglap Road (Before Seaside Residences) (end)	Tomlinson Road (loop)	Short-trip	Go-Ahead Singapore	Loyang
37	Tampines Bus Interchange	Changi North Crescent (loop)	Trunk	Go-Ahead Singapore	Tampines
38	Tampines Bus Interchange	Bedok Bus Interchange	Trunk	Go-Ahead Singapore	Tampines
39	Tampines Concourse Bus Interchange	Yishun Bus Interchange	Trunk	Go-Ahead Singapore	Tampines
39A	Pasir Ris Central (Opposite Pasir Ris Interchange/Mall)	Jalan Kayu (After Piccadilly Circus/TPE)	Short-trip	Go-Ahead Singapore	Tampines
39B	Punggol Way (Block 220C)	Pasir Ris Central (Pasir Ris Interchange/Mall)	Short-trip	Go-Ahead Singapore	Tampines
40	Bedok Bus Interchange	Merpati Road (loop)	Trunk	SBS Transit	Bedok
41	Jurong East Bus Interchange	Jalan Anak Bukit (loop)	Trunk	Tower Transit Singapore	Bulim
42	Jalan Kembangan (Kembangan Station)	Fidelio Street (loop)	Trunk	SBS Transit	Bedok
43	Punggol Bus Interchange	Upper East Coast Bus Terminal	Trunk	Go-Ahead Singapore	Loyang
43A	Punggol Bus Interchange	Serangoon Central (Serangoon Station Exit C/Block 201)	Short-trip	Go-Ahead Singapore	Loyang
43e	Punggol Bus Interchange	Marine Parade Road (Marine Parade MRT station)	Express	Go-Ahead Singapore	Loyang
44	Punggol Coast Bus Interchange	Airport Boulevard via Changi Airport	Trunk	Go-Ahead Singapore	Loyang
45	Upper East Coast Bus Terminal	Ang Mo Kio Avenue 9 (Opposite Yio Chu Kang Stadium) (direction 1); Ang Mo Kio Street 63 (Liuxun Sanhemiao Temple) (direction 2)	Trunk	SBS Transit	Bedok
45A	Lorong Ah Soo (Opposite Block 115)	Upper Serangoon Road (Serangoon Station Exit A/Block 413)	Short-trip	SBS Transit	Bedok
46	Upper East Coast Bus Terminal	Pasir Ris Bus Interchange	Trunk	SBS Transit	Bedok
47	Changi Business Park Bus Terminal	Amber Road (loop)	Trunk	Go-Ahead Singapore	Tampines
48	Bedok North Bus Depot	Buona Vista Bus Terminal	Trunk	SBS Transit	Clementi
49	Jurong East Bus Interchange	Jurong West Street 42 (loop)	Trunk	Tower Transit Singapore	Bulim
50	Bishan Bus Interchange	Punggol Bus Interchange	Trunk	SBS Transit	Bishan–Toa Payoh
50A	Punggol East (After Punggol Field)	Ang Mo Kio Avenue 8 (Before Ang Mo Kio Station Exit B)	Short-trip	SBS Transit	Bishan–Toa Payoh
51	Jurong East Bus Interchange	Hougang Central Bus Interchange	Trunk	SBS Transit	Sengkang–Hougang
51A (Note: Operates from 12amin place of departures of 51 from Jurong East Bus Interchange.)	Jurong East Bus Interchange	Pandan Gardens (Block 407)	Short-trip	SBS Transit	Sengkang–Hougang
52	Bishan Bus Interchange	Jurong East Bus Interchange	Trunk	SBS Transit	Bishan–Toa Payoh
53	Bishan Bus Interchange	Changi Airport (loop)	Trunk	SBS Transit	Serangoon–Eunos
53A	Pasir Ris Drive 1 (Block 738)	Changi Airport	Short-trip	SBS Transit	Serangoon–Eunos
53M	Hougang Street 21 (Kovan Hub)	Serangoon Central (loop)	Trunk (supplementary)	SBS Transit	Serangoon–Eunos
54	Bishan Bus Interchange	Kampong Bahru Bus Terminal	Trunk	SBS Transit	Bishan–Toa Payoh
55	Bishan Bus Interchange	Upper East Coast Bus Terminal	Trunk	SBS Transit	Serangoon–Eunos
55B	Bishan Bus Interchange	Ang Mo Kio Avenue 10 (Block 443)	Short-trip	SBS Transit	Serangoon–Eunos
56	Bishan Bus Interchange	Marina Centre Bus Terminal	Trunk	SBS Transit	Bishan–Toa Payoh
57	Bishan Bus Interchange	Bukit Merah Bus Interchange	Trunk	SBS Transit	Bukit Merah
58	Bishan Bus Interchange	Pasir Ris Bus Interchange	Trunk	SBS Transit	Serangoon–Eunos
58A	Upper Serangoon Road (Serangoon Station Exit B)	Tampines Avenue 10 (Tampines Wafer Fab Park)	Short-trip	SBS Transit	Serangoon–Eunos
58B	Pasir Ris Bus Interchange	Upper Paya Lebar Road (Tai Seng Station Exit A/B)	Short-trip	SBS Transit	Serangoon–Eunos
59	Bishan Bus Interchange	Changi Village Bus Terminal	Trunk	SBS Transit	Serangoon–Eunos
60 (Note: Departures from Eunos Bus Interchange terminate at Bedok Bus Interchange after 11.35pm.)	Eunos Bus Interchange	Bedok Bus Interchange (loop)	Trunk	SBS Transit	Serangoon–Eunos
60A	Eunos Bus Interchange	Bedok Reservoir Road (Block 608)	Short-trip	SBS Transit	Serangoon–Eunos
61	Eunos Bus Interchange	Bukit Batok Bus Interchange	Trunk	SMRT Buses	Choa Chu Kang–Bukit Panjang
62	Punggol Bus Interchange	Sims Avenue (loop)	Trunk	Go-Ahead Singapore	Loyang
62A	Punggol Bus Interchange	Aljunied Road (Aljunied Station Exit B)	Short-trip	Go-Ahead Singapore	Loyang
63	Eunos Bus Interchange	Jalan Rumah Tinggi	Trunk	SBS Transit	Serangoon–Eunos
63M	Eunos Bus Interchange	Circuit Road (loop)	Trunk (supplementary)	SBS Transit	Serangoon–Eunos
64	Sims Place Bus Terminal	Mei Ling Street (loop)	Trunk	SBS Transit	Serangoon–Eunos
65	Tampines Bus Interchange	HarbourFront Bus Interchange	Trunk	Go-Ahead Singapore	Tampines
66	Jurong East Bus Interchange	Upper Bukit Timah Road (loop)	Trunk	Tower Transit Singapore	Bulim
67	Choa Chu Kang Bus Interchange	Tampines Bus Interchange	Trunk	SMRT Buses	Choa Chu Kang–Bukit Panjang
68	Pasir Ris Bus Interchange	Tampines Bus Interchange (loop)	Trunk	Go-Ahead Singapore	Loyang
68A	Tampines Avenue 11 (Before Tampines North Drive 1)	Tampines Bus Interchange	Short-trip	Go-Ahead Singapore	Loyang
68B	Tampines Bus Interchange	Tampines Avenue 11 (After Tampines North Drive 1)	Short-trip	Go-Ahead Singapore	Loyang
69	Tampines Bus Interchange	Bedok Bus Interchange (loop)	Trunk	Go-Ahead Singapore	Tampines
70 (Note: Operates until 6pm on weekdays and Saturdays. Does not operate on Sundays and public holidays.)	Yio Chu Kang Bus Interchange	Shenton Way Bus Terminal	Trunk	SBS Transit	Seletar
70A (Note: Operates in place of 70M after 11.15pm.)	Yio Chu Kang Bus Interchange	Temasek Avenue (Opposite The Ritz-Carlton)	Short-trip	SBS Transit	Seletar
70B	Yio Chu Kang Road (Opposite Serenity Park)	Serangoon Central (Serangoon Station Exit C/Block 201)	Short-trip	SBS Transit	Seletar
70M (Note: Operates from 6.15pm onwards on weekdays and Saturdays, and for the whole day on Sundays and public holidays.)	Yio Chu Kang Bus Interchange	Temasek Avenue (loop)	Trunk (supplementary)	SBS Transit	Seletar
71	Yio Chu Kang Bus Interchange	Bishan Street 11 (loop)	Trunk	SBS Transit	Seletar
72	Yio Chu Kang Bus Interchange	Tampines Bus Interchange	Trunk	Go-Ahead Singapore	Tampines
72A	Yio Chu Kang Bus Interchange	Hougang Central (Opposite Hougang Central Interchange)	Short-trip	Go-Ahead Singapore	Tampines
72B	Yio Chu Kang Bus Interchange	Ang Mo Kio Avenue 5 (ITE College Central)	Short-trip	Go-Ahead Singapore	Tampines
73	Ang Mo Kio Bus Interchange	Toa Payoh Bus Interchange (loop)	Trunk	SBS Transit	Bishan–Toa Payoh
74	Hougang Central Bus Interchange	Buona Vista Bus Terminal	Trunk	SBS Transit	Clementi
75	Gali Batu Bus Terminal	Bukit Merah Bus Interchange	Trunk	SMRT Buses	Choa Chu Kang–Bukit Panjang
76	Yio Chu Kang Bus Interchange	Eunos Bus Interchange	Trunk	SBS Transit	Seletar
77	Bukit Batok Bus Interchange	Marina Centre Bus Terminal	Trunk	Tower Transit Singapore	Bulim
78	Jurong Town Hall Bus Interchange	Clementi Avenue 3 (loop)	Trunk	Tower Transit Singapore	Bulim
78A	Jurong Town Hall Bus Interchange	Tanjong Penjuru (Opposite CLP International)	Short-trip	Tower Transit Singapore	Bulim
79	Jurong Town Hall Bus Interchange	Boon Lay Bus Interchange (loop)	Trunk	Tower Transit Singapore	Bulim
80	Sengkang Bus Interchange	HarbourFront Bus Interchange	Trunk	SBS Transit	Sengkang–Hougang
80A	Sengkang Bus Interchange	Aljunied Road (Aljunied Station)	Short-trip	SBS Transit	Sengkang–Hougang
81	Tampines Bus Interchange	Serangoon Central (loop)	Trunk	Go-Ahead Singapore	Tampines
82	Punggol Bus Interchange	Serangoon Central (loop)	Trunk	Go-Ahead Singapore	Loyang
83	Punggol Bus Interchange	Sengkang Bus Interchange (loop)	Trunk	Go-Ahead Singapore	Loyang
84G	Punggol Bus Interchange	Punggol Way (loop) via Sentul Crescent	Trunk	Go-Ahead Singapore	Loyang
84W	Punggol Bus Interchange	Punggol Way (loop) via New Punggol Road	Trunk	Go-Ahead Singapore	Loyang
85	Punggol Bus Interchange	Yishun Bus Interchange	Trunk	Go-Ahead Singapore	Loyang
85A	Yishun Bus Interchange	Sengkang East Road (Sengkang Community Hub)	Short-trip	Go-Ahead Singapore	Loyang
86	Sengkang Bus Interchange	Ang Mo Kio Bus Interchange	Trunk	SBS Transit	Sengkang–Hougang
86A	Jalan Kayu (After Piccadilly Circus/TPE)	Ang Mo Kio Avenue 6 (Yio Chu Kang Station)	Short-trip	SBS Transit	Sengkang–Hougang
86B	Ang Mo Kio Avenue 6 (Opposite Yio Chu Kang Station)	Jalan Kayu (Before Piccadilly Circus/TPE)	Short-trip	SBS Transit	Sengkang–Hougang
87	Sengkang Bus Interchange	Bedok Bus Interchange	Trunk	SBS Transit	Sengkang–Hougang
88	Pasir Ris Bus Interchange	Toa Payoh Bus Interchange	Trunk	SBS Transit	Bishan–Toa Payoh
88A	Punggol Road (Block 190C)	Ang Mo Kio Avenue 3 (Opposite Ang Mo Kio Station)	Short-trip	SBS Transit	Bishan–Toa Payoh
88B	Ang Mo Kio Avenue 3 (After Ang Mo Kio Station Exit A)	Ang Mo Kio Avenue 5 (Before Yio Chu Kang Road)	Short-trip	SBS Transit	Bishan–Toa Payoh
89	Hougang Central Bus Interchange	Airport Cargo Road (loop)	Trunk	SBS Transit	Sengkang–Hougang
89A	Tampines Expressway (After Punggol Road)	Airport Cargo Road (Airfreight Terminal Building)	Short-trip	SBS Transit	Sengkang–Hougang
89e	Hougang Central Bus Interchange	Airport Cargo Road	Express	SBS Transit	Sengkang–Hougang
90	Toa Payoh Bus Interchange	Airport Road (loop)	Trunk	SBS Transit	Serangoon–Eunos
90A	Toa Payoh Bus Interchange	Airport Road (Paya Lebar Air Base)	Short-trip	SBS Transit	Serangoon–Eunos
91	Buona Vista Bus Terminal	Ayer Rajah Crescent (loop)	Trunk	SBS Transit	Clementi
92	Ghim Moh Bus Terminal	Science Park Drive (loop)	Trunk	SBS Transit	Clementi
92A (Note: Only operates on evenings.)	North Buona Vista Road (Buona Vista Station Exit D)	Science Park Drive (Opposite Normanton Park/Rutherford)	Short-trip	SBS Transit	Clementi
92B (Note: Only operates on weekday and Saturday mornings.)	South Buona Vista Road (Kent Ridge Station Exit B)	Science Park Drive (loop)	Short-trip	SBS Transit	Clementi
93	Eunos Bus Interchange	HarbourFront Bus Interchange	Trunk	SBS Transit	Bukit Merah
94	Eunos Bus Interchange	Airport Road (loop)	Trunk	SBS Transit	Serangoon–Eunos
94A (Note: Operates only on weekday and Saturday mornings.)	Eunos Bus Interchange	Airport Road (Before RSAF Roundabout)	Short-trip	SBS Transit	Serangoon–Eunos
95	Kent Ridge Bus Terminal	Holland Road (loop)	Trunk	SBS Transit	Clementi
95B	Kent Ridge Bus Terminal	North Buona Vista Road (Buona Vista Station Exit C)	Short-trip	SBS Transit	Clementi
96	Clementi Bus Interchange	Kent Ridge Crescent (loop)	Trunk	Tower Transit Singapore	Bulim
96A	Clementi Bus Interchange	Kent Ridge Crescent (NUS Raffles Hall)	Short-trip	Tower Transit Singapore	Bulim
96B	Kent Ridge Crescent (After Architecture Drive)	Commonwealth Avenue West (Clementi Station Exit A)	Short-trip	Tower Transit Singapore	Bulim
97	Tengah Bus Interchange	Marina Centre Bus Terminal	Trunk	Tower Transit Singapore	Bulim
97e	Tengah Bus Interchange	Marina Centre Bus Terminal	Express	Tower Transit Singapore	Bulim
98	Jurong East Bus Interchange	Jurong Pier Way (loop)	Trunk	Tower Transit Singapore	Bulim
98A	Boon Lay Way (Lakeside Station)	Corporation Road (Corporation Place)	Short-trip	Tower Transit Singapore	Bulim
98B	Jurong West Avenue 1 (Block 490)	Jurong Pier Way (Jurong Island Checkpoint)	Short-trip	Tower Transit Singapore	Bulim
98M	Jurong East Bus Interchange	Corporation Road (loop)	Trunk (supplementary)	Tower Transit Singapore	Bulim
99	Clementi Bus Interchange	Joo Koon Bus Interchange	Trunk	SBS Transit	Clementi

=== Routes 100–199 ===
Route number	Origin	Destination	Service type	Operator	Package
100	Serangoon Bus Interchange	Ghim Moh Bus Terminal	Trunk	SBS Transit	Clementi
100A (Note: Only operates on weekday mornings and evenings.)	Serangoon Bus Interchange	Aljunied Road (Aljunied Station Exit B)	Short-trip	SBS Transit	Clementi
101	Serangoon Bus Interchange	Buangkok Crescent (loop)	Trunk	SBS Transit	Serangoon–Eunos
102	Hougang Central Bus Interchange	Seletar Aerospace Avenue (loop)	Trunk	SBS Transit	Sengkang–Hougang
102A (Note: Only operates on weekday evenings.)	Sengkang East Way (Sengkang Station)	Sengkang West Way (Opposite Block 461B)	Short-trip	SBS Transit	Sengkang–Hougang
102B (Note: Only operates on weekday mornings.)	Sengkang West Way (Block 461B)	Sengkang East Way (Opposite Sengkang Station/Block 260A)	Short-trip	SBS Transit	Sengkang–Hougang
103	Serangoon Bus Interchange	Yishun Bus Interchange	Trunk	SBS Transit	Serangoon–Eunos
104	Punggol Coast Bus Interchange	Woodleigh Bus Interchange	Trunk	Go-Ahead Singapore	Loyang
105	Jurong East Bus Interchange	Serangoon Bus Interchange	Trunk	SBS Transit	Serangoon–Eunos
105B	Jurong East Bus Interchange	Commonwealth Avenue West (Clementi Station Exit B)	Short-trip	SBS Transit	Serangoon–Eunos
106	Bukit Batok Bus Interchange	Shenton Way Bus Terminal	Trunk	Tower Transit Singapore	Bulim
106A	Bukit Batok Bus Interchange	Commonwealth Avenue West (Clementi Station Exit B)	Short-trip	Tower Transit Singapore	Bulim
107 (Note: Operates until 7.30pm on weekdays and 1.30pm on Saturdays. Does not operate when 107M is in operation.)	Hougang Central Bus Interchange	Shenton Way Bus Terminal	Trunk	SBS Transit	Sengkang–Hougang
107M (Note: Operates from 7.50pm on weekdays, from 1.43pm on Saturdays, and throughout Sundays and public holidays. Does not operate when 107 is in operation.)	Hougang Central Bus Interchange	Marina Centre Bus Terminal	Trunk (supplementary)	SBS Transit	Sengkang–Hougang
109	Serangoon Bus Interchange	Changi Village Bus Terminal	Trunk	SBS Transit	Serangoon–Eunos
109A	Serangoon Bus Interchange	Hougang Avenue 4 (Block 913)	Short-trip	SBS Transit	Serangoon–Eunos
110	Buangkok Bus Interchange	Changi Airport (loop)	Trunk	SMRT Buses	Woodlands
111	Ghim Moh Bus Terminal	Temasek Avenue (loop)	Trunk	SBS Transit	Clementi
112	Hougang Central Bus Interchange	Hougang Street 92 (loop)	Trunk	SBS Transit	Sengkang–Hougang
112A (Note: Operates in place of 112 between 12.15am and 12.30am.)	Hougang Central Bus Interchange	Upper Serangoon Road (Kovan Station Exit B)	Short-trip	SBS Transit	Sengkang–Hougang
112B	Hougang Central Bus Interchange	Hougang Avenue 7 (Opposite Block 321)	Short-trip	SBS Transit	Sengkang–Hougang
113	Hougang Central Bus Interchange	Upper Paya Lebar Road (loop)	Trunk	SBS Transit	Sengkang–Hougang
113A	Upper Serangoon Road (Kovan Station)	Upper Paya Lebar Road (loop)	Short-trip	SBS Transit	Sengkang–Hougang
114	Buangkok Bus Interchange	Yio Chu Kang Bus Interchange	Trunk	SBS Transit	Sengkang–Hougang
114A	Buangkok Bus Interchange	Buangkok Link (Block 991B)	Short-trip	SBS Transit	Sengkang–Hougang
115	Hougang Street 21 (Kovan Hub)	Hougang Avenue 3 (loop)	Trunk	SBS Transit	Sengkang–Hougang
116	Hougang Central Bus Interchange	Serangoon Central (loop)	Trunk	SBS Transit	Sengkang–Hougang
116A	Serangoon North Avenue 4 (Block 504A CP)	Serangoon Central (Serangoon Station Exit C/Block 201)	Short-trip	SBS Transit	Sengkang–Hougang
117 (Note: Does not operate when 117M is in operation.)	Punggol Coast Bus Interchange	Sembawang Bus Interchange	Trunk	SBS Transit	Sengkang–Hougang
117A	Yishun Avenue 1 (Opposite Blocks 469A/469B)	Yishun Avenue 2 (Before Khatib Station)	Short-trip	SBS Transit	Sengkang–Hougang
117M (Note: Operates on weekdays, from 5.30am to 8am and from 5pm to 7pm. Does not operate when 117 is in operation.)	Punggol Coast Bus Interchange	Sembawang Bus Interchange	Trunk (supplementary)	SBS Transit	Sengkang–Hougang
118	Punggol Bus Interchange	Changi Business Park Bus Terminal	Trunk	Go-Ahead Singapore	Loyang
118A	Punggol Bus Interchange	Simei Avenue (ITE College East Adm Block)	Short-trip	Go-Ahead Singapore	Loyang
118B	Simei Avenue (Opposite ITE College East Adm Block)	Tampines Expressway (Before Punggol Road)	Short-trip	Go-Ahead Singapore	Loyang
119	Punggol Bus Interchange	Hougang Street 21 (loop)	Trunk	Go-Ahead Singapore	Loyang
120	Kampong Bahru Bus Terminal	Telok Blangah Heights (loop)	Trunk	SBS Transit	Bukit Merah
121	Shenton Way Bus Terminal	Telok Blangah Rise (loop)	Trunk	SBS Transit	Bukit Merah
122	Kampong Bahru Bus Terminal	Commonwealth Drive (loop)	Trunk	SBS Transit	Bukit Merah
123	Bukit Merah Bus Interchange	Beach Station Bus Terminal	Trunk	SBS Transit	Bukit Merah
123M	HarbourFront Bus Interchange	Tiong Bahru Road (loop)	Trunk (supplementary)	SBS Transit	Bukit Merah
124	Saint Michael's Bus Terminal	HarbourFront Bus Interchange	Trunk	SBS Transit	Bishan–Toa Payoh
125	Saint Michael's Bus Terminal	Sims Drive (loop)	Trunk	SBS Transit	Bishan–Toa Payoh
125A	Aljunied Road (Opposite Aljunied Station)	MacPherson Road (Before Siemens Centre)	Short-trip	SBS Transit	Bishan–Toa Payoh
127	Tampines Bus Interchange	Tampines Industrial Avenue 5 (loop)	Trunk	Go-Ahead Singapore	Tampines
127A (Note: Operates in place of 127 after 11.30pm.)	Tampines Bus Interchange	Tampines North Drive 1 (Opposite Block 610C)	Short-trip	Go-Ahead Singapore	Tampines
129	Tampines North Bus Interchange	Saint Michael's Bus Terminal	Trunk	Go-Ahead Singapore	Tampines
129A	Tampines Avenue 1 (Temasek Poly East G)	Bartley Road (Bartley Station Exit A)	Short-trip	Go-Ahead Singapore	Tampines
129B (Note: Only operates on weekdays.)	Bartley Road (Gambir Ridge)	Tampines Avenue 1 (Opposite Temasek Poly East G)	Short-trip	Go-Ahead Singapore	Tampines
130	Ang Mo Kio Bus Interchange	Shenton Way Bus Terminal	Trunk	SBS Transit	Seletar
131	Saint Michael's Bus Terminal	Bukit Merah Bus Interchange	Trunk	SBS Transit	Bukit Merah
131A	Saint Michael's Bus Terminal	Shenton Way (After Straits Boulevard)	Short-trip	SBS Transit	Bukit Merah
132	Hougang Central Bus Interchange	Bukit Merah Bus Interchange	Trunk	SBS Transit	Sengkang–Hougang
133	Ang Mo Kio Bus Interchange	Shenton Way Bus Terminal	Trunk	SBS Transit	Seletar
134	Sims Place Bus Terminal	Marine Terrace (loop)	Trunk	SBS Transit	Serangoon–Eunos
135	Ang Mo Kio Bus Interchange	Jalan Kembangan (Kembangan Station)	Trunk	SBS Transit	Seletar
136	Ang Mo Kio Bus Interchange	Punggol Bus Interchange	Trunk	Go-Ahead Singapore	Loyang
137	Sims Place Bus Terminal	Upper East Coast Bus Terminal	Trunk	SBS Transit	Serangoon–Eunos
137A	New Upper Changi Road (Bedok Station Exit B)	Bedok North Road (Bedok North Station Exit A)	Short-trip	SBS Transit	Serangoon–Eunos
138	Ang Mo Kio Bus Interchange	Singapore Zoo (loop)	Trunk	SBS Transit	Seletar
138A (Note: Only operates on mornings.)	Upper Thomson Road (Springleaf Station Exit 3)	Singapore Zoo	Short-trip	SBS Transit	Seletar
138C (Note: Does not operate on weekdays.)	Singapore Zoo	Upper Thomson Road (Springleaf Station Exit 2)	Short-trip	SBS Transit	Seletar
138M (Note: Does not operate on Sundays and public holidays.)	Ang Mo Kio Bus Interchange	Ang Mo Kio Avenue 6 (loop)	Trunk (supplementary)	SBS Transit	Seletar
139	Toa Payoh Bus Interchange	Bukit Merah Bus Interchange	Trunk	SBS Transit	Bishan–Toa Payoh
139A	Toa Payoh Bus Interchange	Jalan Bahagia (Between Blocks 33/34)	Short-trip	SBS Transit	Bishan–Toa Payoh
140	Lorong 1 Geylang Bus Terminal	Saint Wilfred Road (loop)	Trunk	SBS Transit	Serangoon–Eunos
141	Lorong 1 Geylang Bus Terminal	Toa Payoh Bus Interchange	Trunk	SBS Transit	Serangoon–Eunos
142	Toa Payoh Bus Interchange	Potong Pasir Avenue 1 (loop)	Trunk	SBS Transit	Bishan–Toa Payoh
142A	Toa Payoh Bus Interchange	Potong Pasir Avenue 1 (Block 122)	Short-trip	SBS Transit	Bishan–Toa Payoh
143	Jurong East Bus Interchange	Toa Payoh Bus Interchange	Trunk	Tower Transit Singapore	Bulim
143M	Jurong East Bus Interchange	Pandan Gardens (loop)	Trunk (supplementary)	Tower Transit Singapore	Bulim
145	Toa Payoh Bus Interchange	Buona Vista Bus Terminal	Trunk	SBS Transit	Bukit Merah
145A	Tiong Bahru Road (Redhill Station Exit A)	Henderson Road (Block 1)	Short-trip	SBS Transit	Bukit Merah
146	Woodleigh Bus Interchange	Hougang Street 21 (loop)	Trunk	SBS Transit	Serangoon–Eunos
147	Hougang Central Bus Interchange	Clementi Bus Interchange	Trunk	SBS Transit	Clementi
147A	Hougang Central Bus Interchange	New Bridge Road (After Duxton Plain Park)	Short-trip	SBS Transit	Clementi
148	Woodleigh Bus Interchange	Potong Pasir Avenue 1 (loop)	Trunk	SBS Transit	Serangoon–Eunos
150	Eunos Bus Interchange	Marine Terrace (loop)	Trunk	SBS Transit	Serangoon–Eunos
151	Hougang Central Bus Interchange	Kent Ridge Bus Terminal	Trunk	SBS Transit	Sengkang–Hougang
153	Hougang Central Bus Interchange	Bukit Merah Bus Interchange	Trunk	SBS Transit	Sengkang–Hougang
154	Boon Lay Bus Interchange	Eunos Bus Interchange	Trunk	SBS Transit	Serangoon–Eunos
154A	Yung Ho Road (Block 151)	Boon Lay Way (Lakeside Station)	Short-trip	SBS Transit	Serangoon–Eunos
154B	Boon Lay Bus Interchange	Clementi Road (Ngee Ann Polytechnic)	Short-trip	SBS Transit	Serangoon–Eunos
155	Toa Payoh Bus Interchange	Bedok Bus Interchange	Trunk	SBS Transit	Bishan–Toa Payoh
156	Buangkok Bus Interchange	Clementi Bus Interchange	Trunk	SBS Transit	Clementi
157	Toa Payoh Bus Interchange	Boon Lay Bus Interchange	Trunk	SBS Transit	Bishan–Toa Payoh
158	Serangoon Bus Interchange	Rhu Cross (loop)	Trunk	SBS Transit	Serangoon–Eunos
158A	Aljunied Road (Aljunied Station)	Rhu Cross (loop)	Short-trip	SBS Transit	Serangoon–Eunos
159	Sengkang Bus Interchange	Toa Payoh Bus Interchange	Trunk	SBS Transit	Sengkang–Hougang
159A	Sengkang Bus Interchange	Ang Mo Kio Avenue 8 (Before Ang Mo Kio Station Exit B)	Short-trip	SBS Transit	Sengkang–Hougang
159B	Ang Mo Kio Avenue 8 (After Ang Mo Kio Interchange)	Ang Mo Kio Avenue 5 (ITE College Central)	Short-trip	SBS Transit	Sengkang–Hougang
160	Jurong Town Hall Bus Interchange	Johor Bahru Sentral Bus Terminal (loop)	Cross-border	SBS Transit	Bukit Merah
160A	Jurong Town Hall Bus Interchange	Bukit Batok Road (Opposite Dunearn Secondary School)	Short-trip	SBS Transit	Bukit Merah
161	Hougang Central Bus Interchange	Woodlands Bus Interchange	Trunk	SBS Transit	Sengkang–Hougang
162	Yio Chu Kang Bus Interchange	Sin Ming Drive (loop)	Trunk	SBS Transit	Seletar
163	Sengkang Bus Interchange	Toa Payoh Bus Interchange	Trunk	SBS Transit	Sengkang–Hougang
163A (Note: Operates after 11.30pm in place of departures of 163 from Sengkang Bus Interchange.)	Sengkang Bus Interchange	Fernvale Lane (Before Sengkang West Road)	Short-trip	SBS Transit	Sengkang–Hougang
163B	Sengkang Bus Interchange	Yio Chu Kang Road (After Lentor Station Exit 4)	Short-trip	SBS Transit	Sengkang–Hougang
165	Hougang Central Bus Interchange	Clementi Bus Interchange	Trunk	SBS Transit	Sengkang–Hougang
166	Ang Mo Kio Bus Interchange	Clementi Bus Interchange	Trunk	SBS Transit	Clementi
167	Sembawang Bus Interchange	Bukit Merah Bus Interchange	Trunk	Tower Transit Singapore	Sembawang–Yishun
168	Woodlands Bus Interchange	Bedok Bus Interchange	Trunk	SBS Transit	Bedok
168A	Woodlands Bus Interchange	Tampines Avenue 4 (Opposite Tampines Station/Interchange)	Short-trip	SBS Transit	Bedok
169	Woodlands Bus Interchange	Ang Mo Kio Bus Interchange	Trunk	Tower Transit Singapore	Sembawang–Yishun
169A	Woodlands Bus Interchange	Yishun Avenue 2 (Opposite Yishun Station)	Short-trip	Tower Transit Singapore	Sembawang–Yishun
169B	Woodlands Bus Interchange	Woodlands Avenue 8 (Before Woodlands Industrial Park E3)	Short-trip	Tower Transit Singapore	Sembawang–Yishun
170	Queen Street Bus Terminal	Larkin Sentral	Cross-border	SBS Transit	Bukit Merah
170X	Woodlands Road (Kranji Station)	Johor Bahru Sentral Bus Terminal	Cross-border	SBS Transit	Bukit Merah
171	Yishun Bus Interchange	Upper Bukit Timah Road (loop)	Trunk	Tower Transit Singapore	Sembawang–Yishun
172	Choa Chu Kang Bus Interchange	Boon Lay Bus Interchange	Trunk	SMRT Buses	Choa Chu Kang–Bukit Panjang
173	Bukit Batok Bus Interchange	Clementi Bus Interchange	Trunk	Tower Transit Singapore	Bulim
173A (Note: Operates after 11.30pm in place of departures of 173 from Bukit Batok Bus Interchange.)	Bukit Batok Bus Interchange	Bukit Batok East Avenue 4 (Block 254)	Short-trip	Tower Transit Singapore	Bulim
174	Boon Lay Bus Interchange	Kampong Bahru Bus Terminal	Trunk	SBS Transit	Clementi
174e	Boon Lay Bus Interchange	Kampong Bahru Bus Terminal	Express	SBS Transit	Clementi
175	Clementi Bus Interchange	Lorong 1 Geylang Bus Terminal	Trunk	SBS Transit	Clementi
176	Bukit Panjang Bus Interchange	Bukit Merah Bus Interchange	Trunk	SMRT Buses	Choa Chu Kang–Bukit Panjang
177	Bukit Batok Bus Interchange	Jelebu Road (loop)	Trunk	Tower Transit Singapore	Bulim
178	Woodlands Bus Interchange	Boon Lay Bus Interchange	Trunk	SMRT Buses	Woodlands
178A	Woodlands Bus Interchange	Woodlands Road (Kranji Station)	Short-trip	SMRT Buses	Woodlands
179	Boon Lay Bus Interchange	Nanyang Drive (loop)	Trunk	SMRT Buses	Jurong West
179A	Boon Lay Bus Interchange	Nanyang Drive (loop)	Trunk (supplementary)	SMRT Buses	Jurong West
179B	Lien Ying Chow Drive (Hall 1)	Jurong West Street 63 (Pioneer Station Exit B)	Trunk (supplementary)	SMRT Buses	Jurong West
180	Boon Lay Bus Interchange	Bukit Panjang Bus Interchange (loop)	Trunk	SMRT Buses	Choa Chu Kang–Bukit Panjang
180A (Note: Only operates on evenings.)	Boon Lay Bus Interchange	Bukit Panjang Road (Block 183)	Short-trip	SMRT Buses	Choa Chu Kang–Bukit Panjang
181	Boon Lay Bus Interchange	Tengah Bus Interchange	Trunk	SMRT Buses	Jurong West
181A	Boon Lay Bus Interchange	Jurong West Avenue 3 (Block 276B)	Short-trip	SMRT Buses	Jurong West
181M	Boon Lay Bus Interchange	Jurong West Street 23 (loop)	Trunk (supplementary)	SMRT Buses	Jurong West
182	Joo Koon Bus Interchange	Tuas South Avenue 9 (loop)	Trunk	SMRT Buses	Jurong West
182A (Note: Only operates on the evenings of Sundays and public holidays.)	Tuas West Drive (Opposite Tuas Link Station)	Tuas South Avenue 3 (Before Tuas South Avenue 4)	Short-trip	SMRT Buses	Jurong West
182M	Joo Koon Bus Interchange	Tuas South Avenue 9 (loop)	Trunk (supplementary)	SMRT Buses	Jurong West
183	Jurong East Bus Interchange	Science Park Road (loop)	Trunk	Tower Transit Singapore	Bulim
183B	Jurong East Bus Interchange	Toh Tuck Avenue (After Toh Tuck Link)	Short-trip	Tower Transit Singapore	Bulim
184	Gali Batu Bus Terminal	Commonwealth Avenue West (loop)	Trunk	SMRT Buses	Choa Chu Kang–Bukit Panjang
185	Soon Lee Bus Depot	Buona Vista Bus Terminal	Trunk	SMRT Buses	Jurong West
186	Shenton Way Bus Terminal	Saint Michael's Bus Terminal	Trunk	SBS Transit	Bishan–Toa Payoh
187	Woodlands Bus Interchange	Boon Lay Bus Interchange	Trunk	SMRT Buses	Woodlands
188	Choa Chu Kang Bus Interchange	HarbourFront Bus Interchange	Trunk	SMRT Buses	Choa Chu Kang–Bukit Panjang
188e (Note: Unidirectional service.)	Choa Chu Kang Bus Interchange	HarbourFront Bus Interchange	Express	SMRT Buses	Choa Chu Kang–Bukit Panjang
189	Bukit Batok Bus Interchange	Clementi Avenue 1 (loop)	Trunk	Tower Transit Singapore	Bulim
189A (Note: Operates from 7am to 9.05am on weekdays, and daily after 11.15pm in place of 189.)	Bukit Batok Bus Interchange	Bukit Batok Street 23 (Opposite Midview Building)	Short-trip	Tower Transit Singapore	Bulim
190	Choa Chu Kang Bus Interchange	Kampong Bahru Bus Terminal	Trunk	SMRT Buses	Choa Chu Kang–Bukit Panjang
190A	Choa Chu Kang Bus Interchange	Dhoby Ghaut MRT station	Short-trip	SMRT Buses	Choa Chu Kang–Bukit Panjang
191	Buona Vista Bus Terminal	Portsdown Road (loop)	Trunk	SBS Transit	Clementi
192	Boon Lay Bus Interchange	Tuas Bus Terminal	Trunk	SMRT Buses	Jurong West
193	Boon Lay Bus Interchange	Tuas Bus Terminal	Trunk	SMRT Buses	Jurong West
194	Boon Lay Bus Interchange	Jalan Ahmad Ibrahim (loop)	Trunk	SMRT Buses	Jurong West
195	Marina Centre Bus Terminal	Commonwealth Avenue (loop)	Trunk	SBS Transit	Bukit Merah
195A	Marina Centre Bus Terminal	Tiong Bahru Road (Tiong Bahru Station/Plaza)	Short-trip	SBS Transit	Bukit Merah
196	Bedok Bus Interchange	Clementi Bus Interchange	Trunk	SBS Transit	Bedok
196A	Bedok Bus Interchange	Shenton Way (Prince Edward Road Station Exit 2)	Short-trip	SBS Transit	Bedok
196e	Marine Parade Road	Shenton Way (Prince Edward Road Station Exit 2) (direction 1); Anson Road (Hub Synergy Point) (direction 2)	Express	SBS Transit	Bedok
197	Bedok Bus Interchange	Jurong East Bus Interchange	Trunk	SBS Transit	Clementi
198	Boon Lay Bus Interchange	Bukit Merah Bus Interchange	Trunk	SBS Transit	Bukit Merah
198A	Boon Lay Bus Interchange	Jurong East Avenue 1 (Opposite Parc Oasis)	Short-trip	SBS Transit	Bukit Merah
199	Boon Lay Bus Interchange	Nanyang Crescent (loop)	Trunk	SMRT Buses	Jurong West

=== Routes 200–299 ===
Route number	Origin	Destination	Service type	Operator	Package
200	Buona Vista Bus Terminal	Kent Ridge Bus Terminal (loop)	Trunk	SBS Transit	Clementi
200A (Note: Operates after 11.55pm in place of departures of 200 from Buona Vista Bus Terminal.)	Buona Vista Bus Terminal	Kent Ridge Bus Terminal	Short-trip	SBS Transit	Clementi
201	Kent Ridge Bus Terminal	Pandan Gardens (loop)	Trunk	SBS Transit	Clementi
222	Bedok Bus Interchange	Chai Chee Drive (loop)	Feeder	SBS Transit	Bedok
222A (Note: Only operates on weekday mornings.)	Bedok Bus Interchange	New Upper Changi Road (Bedok Station Exit A)	Short-trip	SBS Transit	Bedok
222B (Note: Only operates on weekday mornings and evenings.)	New Upper Changi Road (Bedok Station)	Chai Chee Drive (loop)	Short-trip	SBS Transit	Bedok
225G	Bedok Bus Interchange	Bedok North Street 3 (loop) via Bedok North Avenue 1	Feeder	SBS Transit	Bedok
225W	Bedok Bus Interchange	Bedok North Street 3 (loop) via Bedok North Street 1	Feeder	SBS Transit	Bedok
228	Bedok Bus Interchange	Bedok Reservoir Road (loop)	Feeder	SBS Transit	Bedok
229	Bedok Bus Interchange	Bedok South Road (loop)	Feeder	SBS Transit	Bedok
230	Toa Payoh Link (Caldecott Station Exit 1)	Lorong 8 Toa Payoh (loop)	Feeder	SBS Transit	Bishan–Toa Payoh
230M	Toa Payoh Bus Interchange	Kim Keat Avenue (loop)	Feeder	SBS Transit	Bishan–Toa Payoh
231	Toa Payoh Bus Interchange	Lorong 5 Toa Payoh (loop)	Feeder	SBS Transit	Bishan–Toa Payoh
232	Toa Payoh Bus Interchange	Toa Payoh East (loop)	Feeder	SBS Transit	Bishan–Toa Payoh
235	Toa Payoh Bus Interchange	Toa Payoh Link (loop)	Feeder	SBS Transit	Bishan–Toa Payoh
238	Toa Payoh Bus Interchange	Lorong 8 Toa Payoh (loop)	Feeder	SBS Transit	Bishan–Toa Payoh
240	Boon Lay Bus Interchange	Jalan Ahmad Ibrahim (loop)	Feeder	SMRT Buses	Jurong West
240A	Corporation Drive (Block 65)	Boon Lay Way (Lakeside Station)	Short-trip	SMRT Buses	Jurong West
240M (Note: Only operates on weekdays.)	Boon Lay Way (Lakeside Station)	Jurong West Street 64 (loop)	Feeder (supplementary)	SMRT Buses	Jurong West
241	Boon Lay Bus Interchange	Jurong West Street 91 (loop)	Feeder	SMRT Buses	Jurong West
241A	Jurong West Street 91 (Block 962)	Jurong West Street 63 (Pioneer Station Exit B)	Short-trip	SMRT Buses	Jurong West
242	Boon Lay Bus Interchange	Jurong West Street 71 (loop)	Feeder	SMRT Buses	Jurong West
243G	Boon Lay Bus Interchange	Jurong West Avenue 5 (loop) via Jurong West Street 64	Feeder	SMRT Buses	Jurong West
243W	Boon Lay Bus Interchange	Jurong West Avenue 5 (loop) via Jurong West Street 62	Feeder	SMRT Buses	Jurong West
246	Boon Lay Bus Interchange	Boon Lay Drive (loop)	Trunk	SMRT Buses	Jurong West
247	Tuas Bus Terminal	Tuas Bay Link (loop)	Trunk	SMRT Buses	Jurong West
248	Tuas Bus Terminal	Tuas South Avenue 14 (loop)	Trunk	SMRT Buses	Jurong West
248M	Tuas Bus Terminal	Tuas Port Transport Hub (loop)	Trunk	SMRT Buses	Jurong West
249	Boon Lay Bus Interchange	Jalan Samulun (loop)	Trunk	SMRT Buses	Jurong West
249A	Boon Lay Bus Interchange	Tanjong Kling Road [Tanjong Kling Road (End)]	Short-trip	SMRT Buses	Jurong West
251	Boon Lay Bus Interchange	Shipyard Road (loop)	Trunk	SMRT Buses	Jurong West
252	Boon Lay Bus Interchange	Joo Koon Road (loop)	Trunk	SMRT Buses	Jurong West
253	Joo Koon Bus Interchange	Benoi Road (loop)	Trunk	SMRT Buses	Jurong West
254	Joo Koon Bus Interchange	Tuas Avenue 11 (loop)	Trunk	SMRT Buses	Jurong West
255	Joo Koon Bus Interchange	Gul Crescent (loop)	Trunk	SMRT Buses	Jurong West
257	Joo Koon Bus Interchange	Pioneer Sector 2 (loop)	Trunk	SMRT Buses	Jurong West
258	Joo Koon Bus Interchange	Jurong West Street 64 (loop)	Trunk	SMRT Buses	Jurong West
258M (Note: Only operates in the mornings of weekends and public holidays.)	Joo Koon Bus Interchange	Boon Lay Place (loop)	Trunk	SMRT Buses	Jurong West
261	Ang Mo Kio Bus Interchange	Ang Mo Kio Avenue 10 (loop)	Feeder	SBS Transit	Seletar
262	Ang Mo Kio Bus Interchange	Ang Mo Kio Avenue 2 (loop)	Feeder	SBS Transit	Seletar
265	Ang Mo Kio Street 63 (Liuxun Sanhemiao Temple) (start); Ang Mo Kio Avenue 9 (Opposite Yio Chu Kang Stadium) (end)	Ang Mo Kio Avenue 10 (loop)	Feeder	SBS Transit	Seletar
268	Ang Mo Kio Street 63 (Before Ang Mo Kio Street 64)	Ang Mo Kio Industrial Park 2 (loop)	Feeder	SBS Transit	Seletar
268A	Ang Mo Kio Street 63 (Before Ang Mo Kio Street 64)	Ang Mo Kio Avenue 5 (Techplace 2)	Short-trip	SBS Transit	Seletar
268B	Ang Mo Kio Avenue 9 (Opposite Ang Mo Kio Police Division HQ)	Ang Mo Kio Avenue 3 (After Ang Mo Kio Station Exit A)	Short-trip	SBS Transit	Seletar
268C	Ang Mo Kio Avenue 3 (Opposite Ang Mo Kio Station)	Ang Mo Kio Avenue 9 (Ang Mo Kio Police Division HQ)	Short-trip	SBS Transit	Seletar
269	Ang Mo Kio Bus Interchange	Ang Mo Kio Street 61 (loop)	Feeder	SBS Transit	Seletar
269A (Note: Only operates on weekday evenings.)	Ang Mo Kio Bus Interchange	Ang Mo Kio Street 61 (Opposite Yio Chu Kang CC)	Short-trip	SBS Transit	Seletar
272	Bukit Merah Bus Interchange	Telok Blangah Rise (loop)	Feeder	SBS Transit	Bukit Merah
273	Bukit Merah Bus Interchange	Henderson Road (loop)	Feeder	SBS Transit	Bukit Merah
282	Clementi Bus Interchange	Clementi West Street 2 (loop)	Feeder	Tower Transit Singapore	Bulim
284	Clementi Bus Interchange	Clementi Avenue 4 (loop)	Feeder	Tower Transit Singapore	Bulim
285	Clementi Bus Interchange	Pandan Loop (loop)	Feeder	Tower Transit Singapore	Bulim
291	Tampines Bus Interchange	Tampines Street 81 (east loop); Tampines Street 33 (west loop)	Feeder	Go-Ahead Singapore	Tampines
292	Tampines Bus Interchange	Tampines Street 22 (loop)	Feeder	Go-Ahead Singapore	Tampines
293	Tampines Bus Interchange	Tampines Street 42 (east loop); Tampines Street 71 (west loop)	Feeder	Go-Ahead Singapore	Tampines
296	Tampines Bus Interchange	Tampines North Drive 2 (loop)	Feeder	Go-Ahead Singapore	Tampines
298	Tampines North Bus Interchange	Tampines Street 86 (loop)	Feeder	Go-Ahead Singapore	Tampines
299	Tampines North Bus Interchange	Tampines Street 96 (loop)	Feeder	Go-Ahead Singapore	Tampines

=== Routes 300–386 ===
Route number	Origin	Destination	Service type	Operator	Package
300	Choa Chu Kang Bus Interchange	Choa Chu Kang Avenue 3 (loop)	Feeder	SMRT Buses	Choa Chu Kang–Bukit Panjang
301	Choa Chu Kang Bus Interchange	Keat Hong Close (loop)	Feeder	SMRT Buses	Choa Chu Kang–Bukit Panjang
302	Choa Chu Kang Bus Interchange	Choa Chu Kang Crescent (loop)	Feeder	SMRT Buses	Choa Chu Kang–Bukit Panjang
302A (Note: Only operates on weekdays.)	Choa Chu Kang Drive (Yew Tee Station)	Choa Chu Kang Crescent (loop)	Short-trip	SMRT Buses	Choa Chu Kang–Bukit Panjang
307	Choa Chu Kang Bus Interchange	Choa Chu Kang Street 62 (north loop); Teck Whye Lane (south loop)	Feeder	SMRT Buses	Choa Chu Kang–Bukit Panjang
307A (Note: Operates daily, but only until 9.36am on Saturdays and until 9.57am on Sundays and public holidays.)	Choa Chu Kang Bus Interchange (start); Choa Chu Kang Avenue 4 (Opposite Choa Chu Kang Station) (end)	Choa Chu Kang Street 62 (loop)	Short-trip	SMRT Buses	Choa Chu Kang–Bukit Panjang
307T	Choa Chu Kang Avenue 4 (Opposite Choa Chu Kang Station) (start); Choa Chu Kang Bus Interchange (end)	Teck Whye Lane (loop)	Short-trip	SMRT Buses	Choa Chu Kang–Bukit Panjang
315	Serangoon Bus Interchange	Serangoon North Avenue 5 (loop)	Feeder	SBS Transit	Serangoon–Eunos
317	Serangoon Bus Interchange	Berwick Drive (loop)	Feeder	SBS Transit	Serangoon–Eunos
324	Hougang Central Bus Interchange	Upper Serangoon View (loop)	Feeder	SBS Transit	Sengkang–Hougang
325	Hougang Central Bus Interchange	Hougang Street 91 (loop)	Feeder	SBS Transit	Sengkang–Hougang
329	Hougang Central Bus Interchange	Buangkok Crescent (loop)	Feeder	SBS Transit	Sengkang–Hougang
333	Jurong East Bus Interchange	Jurong East Street 32 (loop)	Feeder	Tower Transit Singapore	Bulim
334	Jurong East Bus Interchange	Jurong West Street 42 (loop)	Feeder	Tower Transit Singapore	Bulim
335	Jurong East Bus Interchange	Jurong West Avenue 1 (loop)	Feeder	Tower Transit Singapore	Bulim
354	Pasir Ris Bus Interchange	Jalan Loyang Besar (loop)	Feeder	Go-Ahead Singapore	Loyang
358	Pasir Ris Bus Interchange	Pasir Ris Street 41 (east loop); Pasir Ris Drive 10 (west loop)	Feeder	Go-Ahead Singapore	Loyang
359	Pasir Ris Bus Interchange	Pasir Ris Drive 2 (east loop); Pasir Ris Street 71 (west loop)	Feeder	Go-Ahead Singapore	Loyang
371	Sengkang Bus Interchange	Rivervale Crescent (loop)	Feeder	SBS Transit	Sengkang–Hougang
372	Sengkang Bus Interchange	Punggol Road (loop)	Feeder	SBS Transit	Sengkang–Hougang
374	Sengkang Bus Interchange	Fernvale Road (loop)	Feeder	SBS Transit	Sengkang–Hougang
381	Punggol Bus Interchange	Punggol Coast Bus Interchange	Feeder	Go-Ahead Singapore	Loyang
382G	Punggol Bus Interchange	Sumang Walk (loop) via Punggol Field	Feeder	Go-Ahead Singapore	Loyang
382A (Note: Only operates on weekday evenings.)	Punggol Bus Interchange	Sumang Lane (Block 226A)	Feeder	Go-Ahead Singapore	Loyang
382W	Punggol Bus Interchange	Sumang Walk (loop) via Sentul Crescent	Feeder	Go-Ahead Singapore	Loyang
384	Punggol Bus Interchange	Northshore Drive (loop)	Feeder	Go-Ahead Singapore	Loyang
386	Punggol Bus Interchange	Punggol Central (loop)	Feeder	Go-Ahead Singapore	Loyang
386A	Punggol Bus Interchange	Edgedale Plains (Block 682A)	Short-trip	Go-Ahead Singapore	Loyang

=== Routes 400–461 ===
All routes classified as "limited-stop" only operate during weekday peak hours (excluding public holidays).

Route number	Origin	Destination	Service type	Operator	Package
400	Shenton Way Bus Terminal	Marina Bay Cruise Centre (loop)	Trunk	SBS Transit	Bukit Merah
401 (Note: Does not operate on weekdays.)	Bedok Bus Interchange	Fort Road (loop)	Trunk	SBS Transit	Bedok
403	Pasir Ris Bus Interchange	Pasir Ris Road (loop)	Trunk	Go-Ahead Singapore	Loyang
405 (Note: Only operates on specific Singaporean festivals.)	Boon Lay Bus Interchange	Old Choa Chu Kang Road (loop)	Trunk	SMRT Buses	Jurong West
410G	Bishan Bus Interchange	Shunfu Road (loop) via Bishan Street 12	Feeder	SBS Transit	Bishan–Toa Payoh
410W	Bishan Bus Interchange	Shunfu Road (loop) via Bishan Street 14	Feeder	SBS Transit	Bishan–Toa Payoh
451	Keat Hong Link	Bukit Batok West Avenue 5 (Bukit Gombak Station)	Limited-stop	SMRT Buses	Choa Chu Kang–Bukit Panjang
452	Tengah Bus Interchange	Jalan Jurong Kechil (Beauty World Station Exit C)	Limited-stop	Tower Transit Singapore	Bulim
453	Tengah Bus Interchange	Bukit Batok Bus Interchange	Limited-stop	Tower Transit Singapore	Bulim
454	Tampines North Bus Interchange	Tampines Street 86 (loop)	Limited-stop	Go-Ahead Singapore	Tampines
455	Bukit Panjang Bus Interchange	Choa Chu Kang Crescent (loop)	Limited-stop	SMRT Buses	Choa Chu Kang–Bukit Panjang
456	Saint Michael's Bus Terminal	Thomson Road (Novena Station) (loop)	Limited-stop	SBS Transit	Bishan–Toa Payoh
457	Hougang Central	Upper Paya Lebar Road (Tai Seng Station)	Limited-stop	SBS Transit	Sengkang–Hougang
458	Sengkang East Way	Upper Paya Lebar Road (Tai Seng Station)	Limited-stop	SBS Transit	Sengkang–Hougang
459	Punggol MRT station	Upper Paya Lebar Road (Tai Seng Station)	Limited-stop	Go-Ahead Singapore	Loyang
460	Tampines Bus Interchange	Tampines North Drive 2 (loop)	Limited-stop	Go-Ahead Singapore	Tampines
461	Yishun Avenue 6	Yishun Avenue 2 (Khatib Station)	Limited-stop	Tower Transit Singapore	Sembawang-Yishun

=== Routes 502–518A ===
All routes below are classified as "express".

Route number	Origin	Destination	Service type	Operator	Package
502	Soon Lee Bus Depot	Central Boulevard (loop)	Express	SMRT Buses	Jurong West
502A (Note: Only operates on weekday mornings.)	Soon Lee Bus Depot	Central Boulevard (Downtown Station Exit E)	Express	SMRT Buses	Jurong West
506	Jurong East Bus Interchange	Serangoon Bus Interchange	Express	SBS Transit	Serangoon–Eunos (until June 2027) TBC (from June 2027)
518	Pasir Ris Bus Interchange	Bayfront Avenue (loop)	Express	Go-Ahead Singapore	Loyang
518A	Pasir Ris Bus Interchange	Bayfront Avenue (Bayfront Station Exit A)	Express	Go-Ahead Singapore	Loyang

=== Routes 646–684 (City Direct Routes) ===
All routes below only operate during weekday peak hours (excluding public holidays).

Route number	Origin	Destination	Service type	Operator	Package
646	Tampines Street 64	Shenton Way (Prince Edward Road Station Exit 2) (direction 1); Anson Road (Hub Synergy Point) (direction 2)	City Direct	Go-Ahead Singapore	Tampines
647	Bukit Batok West Avenue 5	Temasek Avenue (After Promenade Station Exit C)(direction 1); Temasek Boulevard (Suntec Convention Centre) (direction 2)	City Direct	SMRT Buses	Choa Chu Kang–Bukit Panjang
648	Woodlands Street 82	Shenton Way (Prince Edward Road Station Exit 2) (direction 1); Anson Road (Hub Synergy Point) (direction 2)	City Direct	SMRT Buses	Woodlands
649	Keat Hong Close	Marina Boulevard (Marina Bay Financial Centre) (direction 1); Central Boulevard (Marina Bay Station) (direction 2)	City Direct	SMRT Buses	Choa Chu Kang–Bukit Panjang
650	Yishun Street 41 (Block 432C) (direction 1); Yishun Ring Road (Block 456) (direction 2)	Shenton Way (Prince Edward Road Station Exit 2) (direction 1); Anson Road (Hub Synergy Point) (direction 2)	City Direct	SBS Transit	Seletar
651	Jurong West Avenue 3	Marina Boulevard (Marina Bay Financial Centre) (direction 1); Central Boulevard (Marina Bay Station) (direction 2)	City Direct	Tower Transit Singapore	Bulim
652	Upper Thomson Road	Shenton Way (Prince Edward Road Station Exit 2) (direction 1); Anson Road (After Enggor Street) (direction 2)	City Direct	SBS Transit	Seletar
653	Hume Avenue (Before Summerville) (direction 1); Hillview Avenue (Hillington Green Condo) (direction 2)	Marina Boulevard (Marina Bay Financial Centre) (direction 1); Central Boulevard (Marina Bay Station) (direction 2)	City Direct	Tower Transit Singapore	Bulim
654	Anchorvale Crescent	Shenton Way (Prince Edward Road Station Exit 2) (direction 1); Anson Road (After Enggor Street) (direction 2)	City Direct	SBS Transit	Sengkang–Hougang
655	West Coast Road	Marina Boulevard (Marina Bay Financial Centre) (direction 1); Central Boulevard (Marina Bay Station) (direction 2)	City Direct	SBS Transit	Clementi
656	Canberra Road	Shenton Way (Prince Edward Road Station Exit 2) (direction 1); Anson Road (After Enggor Street) (direction 2)	City Direct	Tower Transit Singapore	Sembawang–Yishun
657	Jurong West Avenue 1	Marina Boulevard (Marina Bay Financial Centre) (direction 1); Central Boulevard (Marina Bay Station) (direction 2)	City Direct	Tower Transit Singapore	Bulim
660	Buangkok Green	Shenton Way (Prince Edward Road Station Exit 2) (direction 1); Anson Road (After Enggor Street) (direction 2)	City Direct	SBS Transit	Sengkang–Hougang
660M	Buangkok Crescent	Shenton Way (Prince Edward Road Station Exit 2) (direction 1); Anson Road (After Enggor Street) (direction 2)	City Direct	SBS Transit	Sengkang–Hougang
661	Pasir Ris Drive 3	Marina Boulevard (Marina Bay Financial Centre) (direction 1); Central Boulevard (Marina Bay Station) (direction 2)	City Direct	Go-Ahead Singapore	Loyang
663	Yishun Avenue 6	Shenton Way (Prince Edward Road Station Exit 2) (direction 1); Anson Road (After Enggor Street) (direction 2)	City Direct	Tower Transit Singapore	Sembawang–Yishun
665	Marsiling Drive	Shenton Way (Prince Edward Road Station Exit 2) (direction 1); Anson Road (After Enggor Street) (direction 2)	City Direct	SMRT Buses	Woodlands
666	Punggol Drive	Raffles Boulevard (Promenade Station/Pan Pacific) (direction 1); Temasek Boulevard (Suntec Convention Centre (direction 2)	City Direct	Go-Ahead Singapore	Loyang
667	Clementi Avenue 4	Marina Boulevard (Marina Bay Financial Centre) (direction 1); Central Boulevard (Marina Bay Station) (direction 2)	City Direct	SBS Transit	Clementi
668	Ang Mo Kio Avenue 5	Marina Boulevard (Marina Bay Financial Centre) (direction 1); Central Boulevard (Marina Bay Station) (direction 2)	City Direct	SBS Transit	Seletar
670	Yishun Avenue 7	Marina Boulevard (Marina Bay Financial Centre) (direction 1); Central Boulevard (Marina Bay Station) (direction 2)	City Direct	Tower Transit Singapore	Sembawang–Yishun
671	Punggol Road	Raffles Boulevard (Promenade Station/Pan Pacific) (direction 1); Temasek Boulevard (Suntec Convention Centre (direction 2)	City Direct	SBS Transit	Sengkang–Hougang
672	Hougang Street 51	Raffles Boulevard (Promenade Station/Pan Pacific) (direction 1); Temasek Boulevard (Suntec Convention Centre (direction 2)	City Direct	SBS Transit	Sengkang–Hougang
673	Punggol Way	Temasek Boulevard	City Direct	Go-Ahead Singapore	Loyang
674	Tengah Boulevard	Marina Boulevard (Marina Bay Financial Centre) (direction 1); Central Boulevard (Marina Bay Station) (direction 2)	City Direct	Tower Transit Singapore	Bulim
675	Yio Chu Kang Road	Temasek Boulevard	City Direct	SBS Transit	Sengkang–Hougang
676	Upper Serangoon Road	Temasek Boulevard	City Direct	SBS Transit	Sengkang–Hougang
677	Punggol Road	Temasek Boulevard	City Direct	SBS Transit	Sengkang–Hougang
678	Punggol Central	Temasek Boulevard	City Direct	Go-Ahead Singapore	Loyang
679	Sengkang West Way	Temasek Boulevard	City Direct	SBS Transit	Sengkang–Hougang
680	Buangkok Crescent	Orchard Road	City Direct	SBS Transit	Sengkang–Hougang
681	Upper Serangoon Road	Moulmein Road	City Direct	SBS Transit	Sengkang–Hougang
682	Compassvale Drive	Orchard Road	City Direct	SBS Transit	Sengkang–Hougang
683	Punggol Central	Moulmein Road	City Direct	Go-Ahead Singapore	Loyang
684	Keat Hong Link	Marina Boulevard (Marina Bay Financial Centre) (direction 1); Central Boulevard (Marina Bay Station) (direction 2)	City Direct	SMRT Buses	Choa Chu Kang–Bukit Panjang

=== Routes 800–883M ===
Route number	Origin	Destination	Service type	Operator	Package
800	Yishun Bus Interchange	Sembawang Road (loop)	Feeder	SBS Transit	Seletar
801	Yishun Bus Interchange	Yishun Avenue 1 (loop)	Feeder	Tower Transit Singapore	Sembawang–Yishun
803	Yishun Bus Interchange	Yishun Avenue 6 (loop)	Feeder	SBS Transit	Seletar
804	Yishun Bus Interchange	Yishun Avenue 11 (loop)	Feeder	SBS Transit	Seletar
805	Yishun Bus Interchange	Yishun Avenue 1 (loop)	Feeder	SBS Transit	Seletar
806	Yishun Bus Interchange	Yishun Avenue 6 (loop)	Feeder	SBS Transit	Seletar
807	Yishun Bus Interchange	Yishun Avenue 5 (loop)	Feeder	SBS Transit	Seletar
807A (Note: Only operates on weekdays.)	Yishun Bus Interchange	Yishun Ring Road (Khatib Station Exit D)	Short-trip	SBS Transit	Seletar
807B (Note: Only operates on weekday mornings.)	Yishun Bus Interchange	Yishun Ring Road (Jiemin Primary School)	Short-trip	SBS Transit	Seletar
807C (Note: Only operates on weekday evenings.)	Yishun Ring Road (Opposite Khatib Station Exit D)	Yishun Ring Road (Opposite Block 445)	Short-trip	SBS Transit	Seletar
811	Yishun Bus Interchange	Yishun Avenue 5 (north loop); Yishun Avenue 1 (south loop)	Feeder	SBS Transit	Seletar
811A	Yishun Bus Interchange	Yishun Avenue 5 (Opposite Yishun Station Exit B)	Short-trip	SBS Transit	Seletar
812	Yishun Bus Interchange	Yishun Avenue 4 (east loop); Yishun Avenue 3 (west loop)	Feeder	SBS Transit	Seletar
825 (Note: Does not operate on Sundays and public holidays.)	Yio Chu Kang Bus Interchange	Lentor Loop (loop)	Trunk	Tower Transit Singapore	Sembawang–Yishun
831G	Tengah Bus Interchange	Tengah Garden Avenue (loop) via Bukit Batok Road	Feeder	Tower Transit Singapore	Bulim
831W	Tengah Bus Interchange	Tengah Garden Avenue (loop) via Tengah Drive	Feeder	Tower Transit Singapore	Bulim
851	Yishun Bus Interchange	Bukit Merah Bus Interchange	Trunk	SBS Transit	Seletar
851e	Yishun Bus Interchange	New Bridge Road (After Duxton Plain Park) (direction 1); Eu Tong Sen Street (Before Pearl's Hill Terrace) (direction 2)	Express	SBS Transit	Seletar
852	Yishun Bus Interchange	Bukit Batok Bus Interchange	Trunk	SBS Transit	Seletar
853	Yishun Bus Interchange	Lorong 1 Geylang Bus Terminal	Trunk	Tower Transit Singapore	Sembawang–Yishun
853M (Note: Only operates on Sundays and public holidays.)	Yishun Bus Interchange	Upper East Coast Bus Terminal	Trunk (supplementary)	Tower Transit Singapore	Sembawang–Yishun
854	Yishun Bus Interchange	Bedok Bus Interchange	Trunk	Tower Transit Singapore	Sembawang–Yishun
854e (Note: Unidirectional service.)	Yishun Bus Interchange	Bedok Bus Interchange	Express	Tower Transit Singapore	Sembawang–Yishun
855	Yishun Bus Interchange	HarbourFront Bus Interchange	Trunk	Tower Transit Singapore	Sembawang–Yishun
856	Yishun Bus Interchange	Woodlands Bus Interchange	Trunk	Tower Transit Singapore	Sembawang–Yishun
856A	Woodlands Bus Interchange	Woodlands Centre Road (Woodlands Train Checkpoint)	Short-trip	Tower Transit Singapore	Sembawang–Yishun
856B	Woodlands Bus Interchange	Canberra Road (After Admiral Hill)	Short-trip	Tower Transit Singapore	Sembawang–Yishun
856C	Admiralty Road (Block 23)	Admiralty Road West (Before British American Tobacco)	Short-trip	Tower Transit Singapore	Sembawang–Yishun
857	Yishun Bus Interchange	Temasek Avenue (loop)	Trunk	Tower Transit Singapore	Sembawang–Yishun
857A	Yishun Bus Interchange	Yio Chu Kang Road (Opposite Sunrise Gardens)	Short-trip	Tower Transit Singapore	Sembawang–Yishun
857B (Note: Operates at 6.32am and 8.32am on weekdays, and after 10.52pm daily in place of 857.)	Yishun Bus Interchange	Temasek Ave (After Promenade Station Exit C)	Short-trip	Tower Transit Singapore	Sembawang–Yishun
858	Woodlands Bus Interchange	Changi Airport (loop)	Trunk	Tower Transit Singapore	Sembawang–Yishun
858A (Note: Operates after 11.15pm daily in place of 858.)	Woodlands Bus Interchange	Yishun Ave 2 (Opposite Yishun Station)	Short-trip	Tower Transit Singapore	Sembawang–Yishun
858B	Jalan Kayu (Before Piccadilly Circus/TPE)	Changi Airport (loop)	Short-trip	Tower Transit Singapore	Sembawang–Yishun
859	Sembawang Bus Interchange	Yishun Bus Interchange (loop)	Trunk	Tower Transit Singapore	Sembawang–Yishun
859A	Sembawang Bus Interchange	Admiralty Link (loop)	Trunk (supplementary)	Tower Transit Singapore	Sembawang–Yishun
859B	Sembawang Bus Interchange	Sembawang Crescent (loop)	Trunk (supplementary)	Tower Transit Singapore	Sembawang–Yishun
860	Yio Chu Kang Bus Interchange	Yishun Bus Interchange (loop)	Trunk	SBS Transit	Seletar
861	Sembawang Bus Interchange	Khatib MRT station (loop)	Trunk	Tower Transit Singapore	Sembawang–Yishun
861A (Note: Operates at 8.33am on weekdays, and daily at 11.30pm in place of 861.)	Sembawang Bus Interchange	Yishun Ring Road (Khatib Station Exit D)	Short-trip	Tower Transit Singapore	Sembawang–Yishun
861B	Yishun Ring Road (Block 624)	Canberra Link (Canberra Station)	Short-trip	Tower Transit Singapore	Sembawang–Yishun
861C	Sembawang Bus Interchange	Yishun Avenue 6 (Opposite Chongfu Primary School)	Short-trip	Tower Transit Singapore	Sembawang–Yishun
861M	Canberra Way (Block 120A)	Sembawang Bus Interchange	Trunk (supplementary)	Tower Transit Singapore	Sembawang–Yishun
870	Tengah Bus Interchange	Jurong Town Hall Interchange	Trunk	Tower Transit Singapore	Bulim
871	Tengah Bus Interchange	Upper Bukit Timah Road (loop)	Trunk	Tower Transit Singapore	Bulim
871A	Tengah Bus Interchange	Bukit Batok East Avenue 2 (Block 240)	Short-trip	Tower Transit Singapore	Bulim
872	Tengah Bus Interchange	Jurong East Street 32 (loop)	Trunk	Tower Transit Singapore	Bulim
872A	Tengah Bus Interchange	Boon Lay Way (Chinese Garden Station)	Short-trip	Tower Transit Singapore	Bulim
873 (Note: Operates alternate trips alongside 873M.)	Tengah Bus Interchange	Hillview Road (loop)	Trunk	Tower Transit Singapore	Bulim
873M (Note: Operates alternate trips alongside 873.)	Tengah Bus Interchange	Bukit Batok Street 52 (loop)	Trunk (supplementary)	Tower Transit Singapore	Bulim
874	Tengah Bus Interchange	Choa Chu Kang Avenue 4 (loop)	Trunk	Tower Transit Singapore	Bulim
882	Sembawang Bus Interchange	Sembawang Road (loop)	Trunk	Tower Transit Singapore	Sembawang–Yishun
882A	Sembawang Bus Interchange	Montreal Link (Block 592A)	Short-trip	Tower Transit Singapore	Sembawang–Yishun
883	Sembawang Bus Interchange	Yishun Central 2 (loop)	Trunk	Tower Transit Singapore	Sembawang–Yishun
883B	Yishun Avenue 2 (Yishun Station)	Sembawang Road (Opposite Block 590C)	Short-trip	Tower Transit Singapore	Sembawang–Yishun
883M	Sembawang Bus Interchange	Yishun Avenue 5 (loop)	Trunk (supplementary)	Tower Transit Singapore	Sembawang–Yishun

=== Routes 900–993 ===
Route number	Origin	Destination	Service type	Operator	Package
900	Woodlands Bus Interchange	Woodlands Avenue 1 (loop)	Feeder	SMRT Buses	Woodlands
901	Woodlands Bus Interchange	Woodlands Avenue 6 (loop)	Feeder	SMRT Buses	Woodlands
901M	Woodlands Bus Interchange	Admiralty MRT station (loop)	Feeder	SMRT Buses	Woodlands
902	Woodlands Bus Interchange	Republic Polytechnic	Feeder	SMRT Buses	Woodlands
903	Woodlands Bus Interchange	Woodlands Centre Road (loop) via Woodlands Train Checkpoint	Feeder	SMRT Buses	Woodlands
903M	Woodlands Bus Interchange	Marsiling Lane (loop)	Feeder	SMRT Buses	Woodlands
904	Woodlands Bus Interchange	Woodlands Crescent (loop)	Feeder	SMRT Buses	Woodlands
911	Woodlands Bus Interchange	Woodlands Avenue 2 (east loop) Woodlands Train Checkpoint (west loop)	Feeder	SMRT Buses	Woodlands
911A	Woodlands Bus Interchange	Woodlands Street 13 (Block 146)	Short-trip	SMRT Buses	Woodlands
912	Woodlands Bus Interchange	Admiralty MRT station (east loop) / Woodlands Train Checkpoint (west loop)	Feeder	SMRT Buses	Woodlands
912A	Woodlands Bus Interchange	Admiralty MRT station (loop)	Short-trip	SMRT Buses	Woodlands
912B	Woodlands Bus Interchange	Woodlands Train Checkpoint (loop)	Short-trip	SMRT Buses	Woodlands
913/T	Woodlands Bus Interchange	Woodlands Circle (east loop) / Marsiling MRT station (west loop)	Feeder	SMRT Buses	Woodlands
913M	Woodlands Bus Interchange	Woodlands Street 13 (loop)	Feeder (supplementary)	SMRT Buses	Woodlands
920	Bukit Panjang Bus Interchange	Bangkit Road (loop)	Feeder	SMRT Buses	Choa Chu Kang–Bukit Panjang
922	Bukit Panjang Bus Interchange	Bangkit Road (loop)	Feeder	SMRT Buses	Choa Chu Kang–Bukit Panjang
925	Woodlands Temporary Bus Interchange	Choa Chu Kang Bus Interchange	Trunk	SMRT Buses	Woodlands
925A	Woodlands Temporary Bus Interchange	Kranji Way (Kranji Reservoir Park B)	Short-trip	SMRT Buses	Woodlands
925M	Woodlands Temporary Bus Interchange	Sungei Buloh Wetland Reserve (loop)	Trunk (supplementary)	SMRT Buses	Woodlands
927	Choa Chu Kang Bus Interchange	Singapore Zoo (loop)	Trunk	SMRT Buses	Choa Chu Kang–Bukit Panjang
941	Bukit Batok Bus Interchange	Bukit Batok West Avenue 9 (loop)	Feeder	Tower Transit Singapore	Bulim
945	Bukit Batok Bus Interchange	Bukit Batok Street 34 (loop)	Feeder	Tower Transit Singapore	Bulim
947	Bukit Batok Bus Interchange	Bukit Batok Road (loop)	Feeder	Tower Transit Singapore	Bulim
950	Woodlands Temporary Bus Interchange (Singapore)	Johor Bahru Checkpoint (Sultan Iskandar Building) (loop)	Cross-border	SMRT Buses	Woodlands
960	Woodlands Bus Interchange	Marina Centre Bus Terminal	Trunk	SMRT Buses	Woodlands
960e	Woodlands Bus Interchange	Marina Centre Bus Terminal	Express	SMRT Buses	Woodlands
961	Woodlands Temporary Bus Interchange	Lorong 1 Geylang Bus Terminal	Trunk	SMRT Buses	Woodlands
961M	Woodlands Temporary Bus Interchange	Lorong 1 Geylang Bus Terminal	Trunk (supplementary)	SMRT Buses	Woodlands
962	Woodlands Bus Interchange	Admiralty Street (loop)	Trunk	SMRT Buses	Woodlands
962B	Sembawang Drive	Admiralty Street (loop)	Short-trip	SMRT Buses	Woodlands
962C	Woodlands Avenue 5 (Block 618)	Woodlands Avenue 6 (Before Admiralty Station/Block 680)	Short-trip	SMRT Buses	Woodlands
963	Woodlands Bus Interchange	HarbourFront Bus Interchange	Trunk	Tower Transit Singapore	Sembawang–Yishun
963e	Woodlands Bus Interchange	HarbourFront Bus Interchange	Express	Tower Transit Singapore	Sembawang–Yishun
964	Woodlands Bus Interchange	Woodlands Link (loop)	Trunk	SMRT Buses	Woodlands
965	Woodlands Temporary Bus Interchange	Buangkok Bus Interchange	Trunk	Tower Transit Singapore	Sembawang–Yishun
965A	Woodlands Temporary Bus Interchange	Yishun Avenue 2 (Opposite Yishun Station)	Short-trip	Tower Transit Singapore	Sembawang–Yishun
966 (Note: Operates exclusively as 966A after 10:30pm.)	Woodlands Bus Interchange	Marine Parade Road (loop)	Trunk	Tower Transit Singapore	Sembawang–Yishun
966A	Woodlands Bus Interchange	Marine Parade Road (Marine Parade Station Exit 2)	Short-trip	Tower Transit Singapore	Sembawang–Yishun
967	Woodlands Temporary Bus Interchange	Woodlands Drive 17 (loop) via Woodlands Health Campus	Trunk	SMRT Buses	Woodlands
968	Woodlands Temporary Bus Interchange	TBA	Trunk	TBA	TBA
969	Tampines Bus Interchange	Woodlands Bus Interchange	Trunk	Tower Transit Singapore	Sembawang–Yishun
969A	Tampines Bus Interchange	Yishun Avenue 2 (Yishun Station)	Short-trip	Tower Transit Singapore	Sembawang–Yishun
970	Bukit Panjang Bus Interchange	Shenton Way Bus Terminal	Trunk	SMRT Buses	Choa Chu Kang–Bukit Panjang
972	Bukit Panjang Bus Interchange	Orchard Road (loop) via Bukit Panjang Road & Stevens Road	Trunk	SMRT Buses	Choa Chu Kang–Bukit Panjang
972A	Bukit Panjang Bus Interchange	Dhoby Ghaut MRT station	Short-trip	SMRT Buses	Choa Chu Kang–Bukit Panjang
972M	Bukit Panjang Bus Interchange	Orchard Road (loop) via Petir Road & Newton MRT station	Trunk (supplementary)	SMRT Buses	Choa Chu Kang–Bukit Panjang
973	Bukit Panjang Bus Interchange	Hume Avenue (loop)	Trunk	SMRT Buses	Choa Chu Kang–Bukit Panjang
973A	Bukit Panjang Bus Interchange	Pending Road (Before Pending Station)	Short-trip	SMRT Buses	Choa Chu Kang–Bukit Panjang
974	Joo Koon Bus Interchange	Bukit Panjang MRT/LRT station (loop)	Trunk	SMRT Buses	Jurong West
974A	Joo Koon Bus Interchange	Choa Chu Kang Avenue 4 (Lot 1/Choa Chu Kang MRT/LRT station)	Short-trip	SMRT Buses	Jurong West
975	Bukit Panjang Bus Interchange	Lim Chu Kang Road (loop)	Trunk	SMRT Buses	Choa Chu Kang–Bukit Panjang
975A	Opposite Choa Chu Kang Station	Brickland Road (After Hai In See Temple)	Short-trip	SMRT Buses	Choa Chu Kang–Bukit Panjang
975B	Opposite Choa Chu Kang Station	Lim Chu Kang Road (Opposite Lim Chu Kang Lane 3)	Short-trip	SMRT Buses	Choa Chu Kang–Bukit Panjang
975C	Bukit Panjang Bus Interchange	Lim Chu Kang Road (Lim Chu Kang Road)	Short-trip	SMRT Buses	Choa Chu Kang–Bukit Panjang
976	Bukit Panjang Bus Interchange	Choa Chu Kang Bus Interchange	Trunk	SMRT Buses	Choa Chu Kang–Bukit Panjang
979	Bukit Panjang Bus Interchange	Choa Chu Kang Crescent (loop)	Trunk	SMRT Buses	Choa Chu Kang–Bukit Panjang
980	Sembawang Bus Interchange	Lorong 1 Geylang Bus Terminal	Trunk	Tower Transit Singapore	Sembawang–Yishun
981	Sembawang Bus Interchange	Senoko Road/Loop	Trunk	Tower Transit Singapore	Sembawang–Yishun
983	Choa Chu Kang Bus Interchange	Bukit Panjang MRT/LRT station (loop)	Trunk	SMRT Buses	Choa Chu Kang–Bukit Panjang
983A	Choa Chu Kang Bus Interchange	Choa Chu Kang Road (Block 26)	Short-trip	SMRT Buses	Choa Chu Kang–Bukit Panjang
983M	Choa Chu Kang Avenue 5 (Opposite Block 486)	Teck Whye Crescent (After Teck Whye Walk)	Trunk (supplementary)	SMRT Buses	Choa Chu Kang–Bukit Panjang
984	Gali Batu Bus Terminal	Jurong Town Hall Bus Interchange	Trunk	Tower Transit Singapore	Bulim
984A	Gali Batu Bus Terminal	Brickland Road (Block 805D)	Short-trip	Tower Transit Singapore	Bulim
985	Choa Chu Kang Bus Interchange	Lorong 1 Geylang Bus Terminal	Trunk	SMRT Buses	Choa Chu Kang–Bukit Panjang
990	Bukit Batok Bus Interchange	Jurong Gateway Road (loop) via Jurong East MRT	Trunk	Tower Transit Singapore	Bulim
991	Bukit Batok Bus Interchange	Choa Chu Kang Bus Interchange	Trunk	SMRT Buses	Choa Chu Kang–Bukit Panjang
991A	Bukit Batok Bus Interchange	Bukit Batok West Avenue 3 (Princess Elizabeth Primary School)	Short-trip	SMRT Buses	Choa Chu Kang–Bukit Panjang
991B	Choa Chu Kang Bus Interchange	Choa Chu Kang Avenue 1 (Opposite Choa Chu Kang Market)	Short-trip	SMRT Buses	Choa Chu Kang–Bukit Panjang
992	Bukit Batok Bus Interchange	Tengah Bus Interchange	Trunk	Tower Transit Singapore	Bulim
993	Jurong East Bus Interchange	Bukit Batok West Avenue 8 (loop)	Trunk	SBS Transit	Bukit Merah

=== Other services ===
Route number	Origin	Destination	Service type	Operator
AC7	Yishun Bus Interchange	Johor Bahru CIQ (Sultan Iskandar Building)	Cross-border Service	Ridewell Travel
CW1	Johor Bahru CIQ (Sultan Iskandar Building)	Woodlands Road (Kranji MRT station)	Cross-border Service	Causeway Link (Handal Indah)
CW2	Johor Bahru CIQ (Sultan Iskandar Building)	Queen Street Bus Terminal	Cross-border Service	Causeway Link (Handal Indah)
CW3	Perling Mall Bus Terminal	Jurong Town Hall Bus Interchange	Cross-border Service	Causeway Link (Handal Indah)
CW4	Pontian Bus Terminal	Jurong Town Hall Bus Interchange	Cross-border Service	Causeway Link (Handal Indah)
CW4S	Sutera Mall Bus Terminal	Jurong Town Hall Bus Interchange	Cross-border Service	Causeway Link (Handal Indah)
CW5	Johor Bahru CIQ (Sultan Iskandar Building)	Newton Circus (Newton Food Centre)	Cross-border Service	Causeway Link (Handal Indah)
CW6	Sultan Abu Bakar Complex	Boon Lay Way (Boon Lay MRT station)	Cross-border Service	Causeway Link (Handal Indah)
CW7	Sultan Abu Bakar Complex	Tuas West Drive (Opposite Tuas Link Station)	Cross-border Service	Causeway Link (Handal Indah)
Giant/IKEA Bedok	Bedok MRT station	Giant/IKEA Tampines	Giant/IKEA shuttle service	ComfortDelGro Bus
IKEA Buona Vista	Buona Vista MRT station	IKEA Alexandra	IKEA shuttle service	ComfortDelGro Bus
Giant/IKEA Pasir Ris	Pasir Ris MRT station	Giant/IKEA Tampines	Giant/IKEA shuttle service	ComfortDelGro Bus
IKEA Redhill	Redhill MRT station	IKEA Alexandra	IKEA shuttle service	ComfortDelGro Bus
Giant/IKEA Sengkang	Sengkang MRT/LRT station	Giant/IKEA Tampines	Giant/IKEA shuttle service	ComfortDelGro Bus
IKEA Tiong Bahru	Tiong Bahru MRT station	IKEA Alexandra	IKEA shuttle service	ComfortDelGro Bus
Giant/IKEA Tampines	Tampines MRT station	Giant/IKEA Tampines	Giant/IKEA shuttle service	ComfortDelGro Bus
RWS8	Telok Blangah Road (HarbourFront MRT station/VivoCity)	Resorts World Sentosa	Resorts World Sentosa shuttle service	Tong Tar Transport Service Pte Ltd
TS1	Changi Airport	Johor Bahru CIQ (Sultan Iskandar Building)	Cross-border service	Transtar Travel
TS3	Raffles Boulevard (Promenade MRT station)	Johor Bahru CIQ (Sultan Iskandar Building)	Cross-border service	Transtar Travel
TS6	Rochester Drive (The Star Vista)	Gelang Patah Sentral Bus Terminal\	Cross-border service	Transtar Travel
TS8	Resorts World Sentosa	Johor Bahru CIQ (Sultan Iskandar Building)	Cross-border service	Transtar Travel
SJE	Queen Street Bus Terminal (Singapore)	Larkin Sentral (Malaysia)	Cross-border service	Singapore-Johore Express
LCS1	Tampines Avenue 9 [AM peak]/ Airport Cargo Road [PM peak]	Airport Cargo Road [AM peak]/ Tampines Avenue 9 [PM peak]	Peak-hour shuttle service	Tower Transit Singapore
LCS2	Punggol Way [AM peak]/ Airport Cargo Road [PM peak]	Airport Cargo Road [AM peak]/ Punggol Way [PM peak]	Peak-hour shuttle service	Tower Transit Singapore

== See also ==
- Public buses of Singapore
