= Yio Chu Kang Bus Interchange =

Bus interchange in Yio Chu Kang, Ang Mo Kio, Singapote

Yio Chu Kang Bus Interchange 杨厝港巴士终站 Pusat Pertukaran Bas Yio Chu Kang
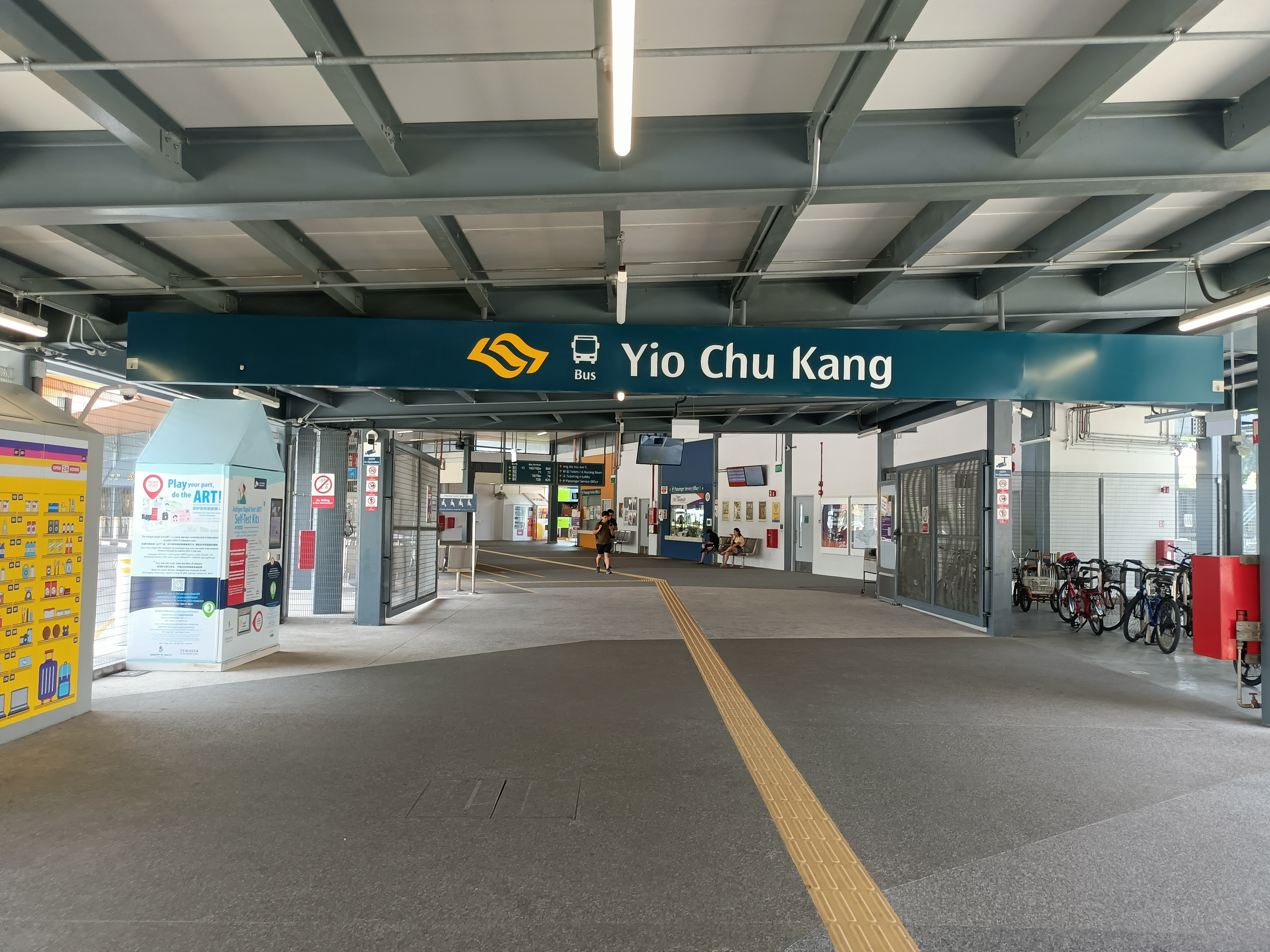
- Yio Chu Kang Bus Interchange entrance from Yio Chu Kang MRT station.

General information
- Location: 3002 Ang Mo Kio Avenue 8, Singapore 567728
- Coordinates: 1°22′54″N 103°50′42″E
- System: Public Bus Interchange
- Owner: Land Transport Authority
- Operator: SBS Transit
- Bus routes: 7 (SBS Transit); 1 (Tower Transit); 1 (Go-Ahead Singapore); 1 (Private Operators)
- Bus stands: 4 Boarding Berths; 3 Alighting Berths
- Bus operators: SBS Transit; Tower Transit Singapore; Go-Ahead Singapore; Private Operators
- Connections: NS15 Yio Chu Kang

Construction
- Structure type: At-grade
- Accessible: Accessible alighting/boarding points Accessible public toilets Graduated kerb edges Tactile guidance system

History
- Opened: 13 December 1987; 38 years ago

Key dates
- 13 December 1987: Commenced operations
Location

Yio Chu Kang Bus Interchange is a bus interchange located in Yio Chu Kang, a sub zone of Ang Mo Kio, Singapore. The interchange is located beneath Yio Chu Kang MRT station. Boarding berths are located north of Yio Chu Kang MRT station concourse while and alighting berths are located south.

This is one of the only few bus interchanges to not be located near a shopping mall (the other being Bukit Merah Bus Interchange)

== History ==
Yio Chu Kang Bus Interchange, then known as Yio Chu Kang Bus Terminal, opened on 13 November 1987, just a few days after the opening of Yio Chu Kang MRT station, and was operated by TIBS (Trans-Island Bus Services). It was then located directly in front of Yio Chu Kang MRT concourse. Service 13 was amended to Yio Chu Kang and Service 76 introduced in 1989, 825 was amended here in 1990, and 70M was introduced following the extension of Service 70 here in 1992. Service 72 was introduced in 1996 and Service 162 in 2001.

On 1 August 2013, Yio Chu Kang Bus Interchange was renamed as a bus interchange.

Service 860 was amended to Yio Chu Kang in 2017.

In December 2017, expansion and renovation works at the interchange commenced and was completed in two phases. The first phase, comprising an expansion that was twice the size of the existing interchange located behind Yio Chu Kang MRT station, with new boarding berths, was completed by October 2019. The second phase, which were renovations to the existing interchange, completed in 2021. The renovated interchange also included a canteen, self-service ticket machines, and features to aid handicapped commuters.

The old Yio Chu Kang Interchange boarding berths in front of Yio Chu Kang MRT station (Exit A) are currently unused.

== Incidents ==
On 23 April 2018 at around 9.30am, three pedestrians were killed after being hit by a lorry. Also involved was a stationary bus at the traffic junction near the exit of the bus interchange.

== Bus contracting model ==
Under the bus contracting model, all bus services operating from Yio Chu Kang Bus Interchange were divided into five bus packages, operated by two bus operators.

=== List of bus services ===
Operator	Package	Routes
Go-Ahead Singapore	Tampines	72, 72A, 72B
SBS Transit	Bedok	13
SBS Transit	Seletar	70, 70A, 70M, 71, 76, 162, 860
SBS Transit	Sengkang-Hougang	114
Tower Transit Singapore	Sembawang-Yishun	825

== Redevelopment ==
As part of the Urban Redevelopment Authority's Draft Master Plan 2025, plans to redevelop the land occupied by the bus interchange and the nearby Yio Chu Kang Stadium into an integrated community hub were indicated.
