= Kampong Bahru Bus Terminal =

Bus terminal in Bukit Merah, Singapore

Kampong Bahru Bus Terminal 甘榜峇鲁路巴士终站 Terminal Bas Kampong Bahru
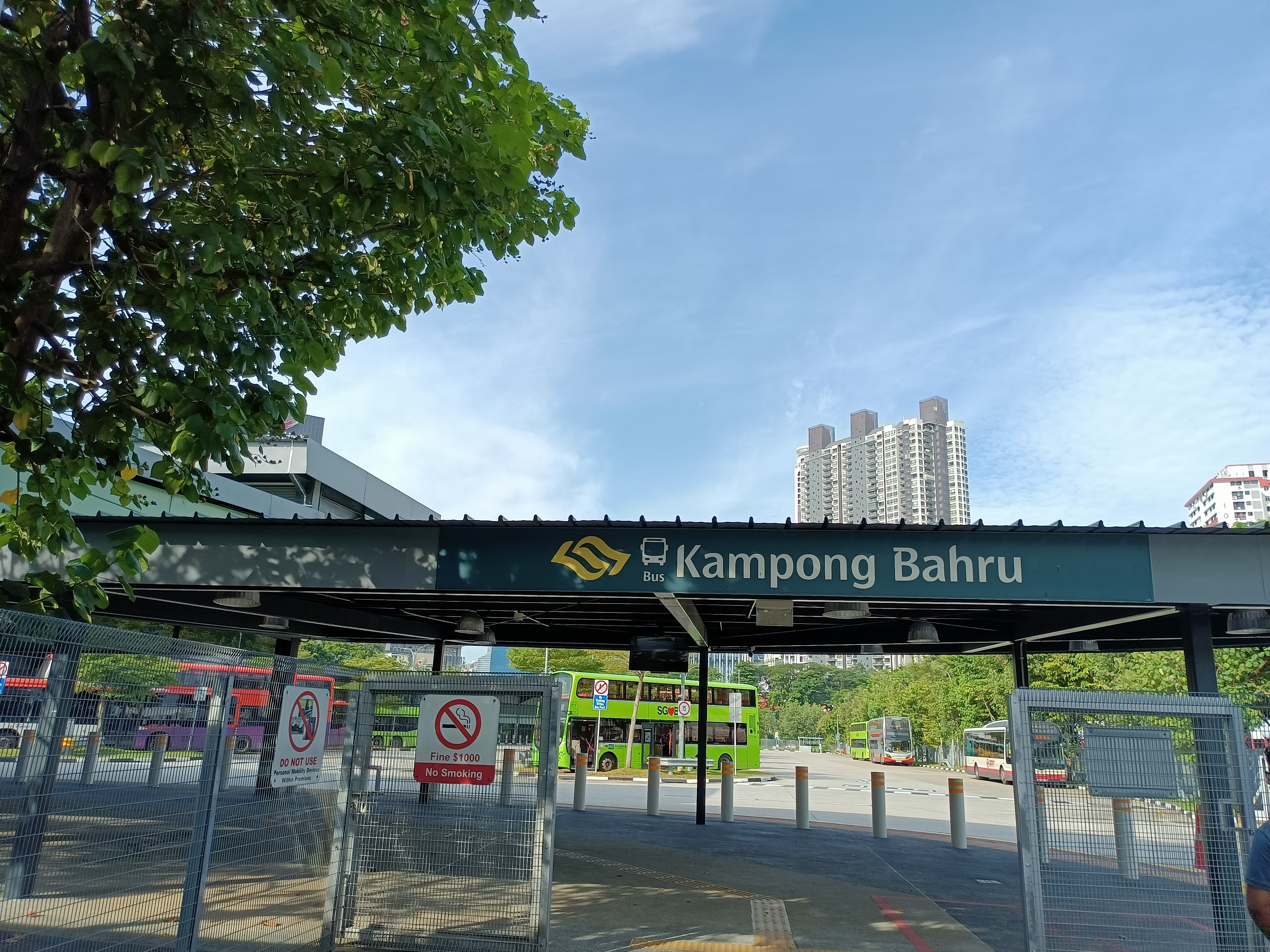

General information
- Location: 11A Spooner Road, Singapore 168795
- Coordinates: 1.2760°N 103.8334°E
- System: Public Bus Terminal
- Owner: Land Transport Authority
- Operator: SBS Transit
- Bus routes: 5 (SBS Transit); 1 (SMRT Buses); 3 (Go-Ahead)
- Bus stands: 2 Alighting Berths; 4 Sawtooth boarding berths
- Bus operators: SBS Transit; SMRT Buses Ltd; Go-Ahead Singapore Pte Ltd
- Connections: CC31 Cantonment

Construction
- Structure type: At-grade
- Parking: Yes (Outram Community Hospital, Singapore General Hospital)
- Accessible: Accessible alighting/boarding points Accessible public toilets Graduated kerb edges Tactile guidance system

History
- Opened: 10 March 2018; 8 years ago

Key dates
- 10 March 2018: Commenced operations
Location

Kampong Bahru Bus Terminal (Malay: Terminal Bas Kampong Bahru; Chinese: 甘榜峇鲁路巴士终站) is a bus terminal in Singapore. It is situated along Spooner Road off Kampong Bahru Road in Bukit Merah, and is located near Outram Community Hospital, as well as the Singapore General Hospital.

== History ==
According to The Straits Times, historically there was a bus terminal located within Radin Mas named Kampong Bahru Bus Terminal. The former bus terminal bears no relation to the contemporary bus terminal of the same name.

The current iteration of Kampong Bahru Bus Terminal was first announced on 23 May 2016, and was constructed and built on land formerly owned by Malayan Railways. The construction of the new bus terminal was intended to replace the former New Bridge Road Bus Terminal, as the site would later be redeveloped into a new elective surgery centre by the Singapore General Hospital. The bus terminal was originally slated for opening by the end of 2017, but it was then delayed to March 2018.

=== Opening ===
The terminal officially began operations on 10 March 2018, with existing services from New Bridge Road Bus Terminal amended to serve the bus terminal on that day. The terminal is located about 500 metres from the former site of New Bridge Road Bus Terminal.

== Bus Contracting Model ==
Under the Bus Contracting Model, all bus services operating from Kampong Bahru Bus Terminal were divided into 5 Bus Packages, operated by three different bus operators.

=== List of Bus Services ===
Operator	Package	Routes
Go-Ahead Singapore	Loyang	2, 12, 12e
SBS Transit	Bishan-Toa Payoh	54
SBS Transit	Bukit Merah	120, 122, 195 (Note: Only starts and ends at this terminal if roads in Marina Centre are closed due to events)
SBS Transit	Clementi	174, 174e
SMRT Buses	Choa Chu Kang-Bukit Panjang	190
