= Tengah Bus Interchange =

Bus Interchange in Singapore

Tengah Bus Interchange 登加巴士转换站 Pusat Pertukaran Bas Tengah
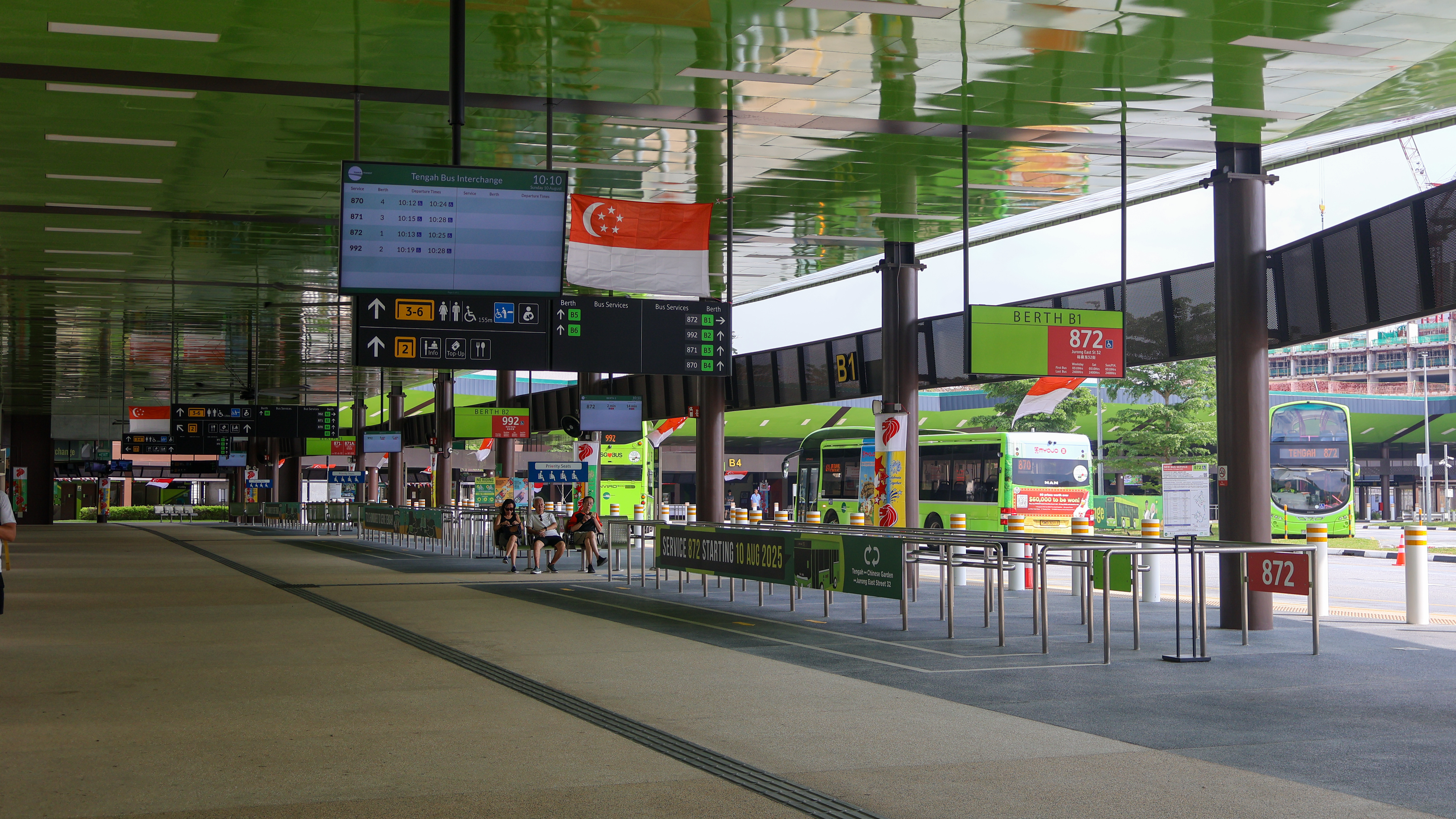

General information
- Location: 42A Tengah Boulevard, Singapore 699896
- System: Public Bus Interchange
- Owner: Land Transport Authority
- Operator: Tower Transit Singapore (Transit Systems)
- Bus routes: 9 (Tower Transit Singapore); 1 (SMRT Buses)
- Bus stands: 3 sawtooth alighting berths 6 sawtooth boarding berths
- Bus operators: Tower Transit Singapore

Construction
- Structure type: At-grade
- Accessible: Accessible alighting/boarding points Accessible public toilets Graduated kerb edges Tactile guidance system

History
- Opening: 21 July 2024; 2 years ago

Key dates
- 21 July 2024: Commenced operations

Tengah Bus Interchange is a bus interchange in Tengah, Singapore. It opened on 21 July 2024, and is operated by Tower Transit. The current interim bus interchange is located along Tengah Boulevard and Tengah Park Avenue beside Parc Woods @ Tengah. The bus interchange is planned to be relocated to the town centre in the coming years, within the complex of the upcoming Tengah Mall and connected to Tengah MRT station.

== History ==
Tengah Bus Interchange commenced operations on 21 July 2024.

Before September 2023, transport options were limited to a free shuttle bus, after which Feeder service 944 was extended and renumbered to trunk service 992. Then on 26 November 2023, in tandem with the opening of Jurong Town Hall Bus Interchange, trunk service 870 was introduced to connect Tengah with Jurong East.

== Bus contracting model ==
Under the bus contracting model, all bus services operating from Tengah Bus Interchange are under the Bulim bus package, operated by the anchor operator, Tower Transit Singapore.

When Tengah Bus Interchange commenced operations, both services 870 & 992 were extended to serve the interchange. In tandem with the interchange opening, a new bus service, trunk service 871, was introduced to better connect Tengah with Bukit Batok West and Beauty World. On the same day, Services 870 and 992 was extended to Tengah Bus Interchange, connecting residents to Jurong East and Bukit Batok.

A new bus service, 872, began operation on 10 August 2025, connecting the bus interchange with Chinese Garden MRT station. New services 452 and 453 began operation on 17 November, connecting to Beauty World MRT station and Bukit Batok Bus Interchange respectively. On 8 March 2026, new bus services 831G and 831W began operation, looping around Tengah town and serving the new Parc Point neighborhood centre. Existing bus services 97 and 97e were also extended from their previous terminus at Jurong East Bus Interchange to Tengah Bus Interchange. Service 181 was extended from Jurong West to Tengah on 14 June 2026. On 25 October 2026, services 873, 873M and 874 were introduced, which travel towards Hume MRT station, Bukit Gombak MRT station, and Choa Chu Kang MRT station respectively.

=== List of bus services ===
Operator	Package	Service	Berth	Destination	Remarks
SMRT Buses	Jurong West	181	B6	Boon Lay	—N/a
Tower Transit Singapore	Bulim	97	B1	Marina Centre	—N/a
Tower Transit Singapore	Bulim	97e	B1	Marina Centre	Express service / weekday morning peak hours only
Tower Transit Singapore	Bulim	452	B3	Jalan Jurong Kechil (Beauty World Station Exit C)	Weekday morning peak hours only
Tower Transit Singapore	Bulim	453	B2	Bukit Batok	Weekday morning peak hours only
Tower Transit Singapore	Bulim	831G	B5	↺ Tengah Garden Avenue via Bt Batok Rd	—N/a
Tower Transit Singapore	Bulim	831W	B4	↺ Tengah Garden Avenue via Tengah Dr	—N/a
Tower Transit Singapore	Bulim	870	B4	Jurong Town Hall	—N/a
Tower Transit Singapore	Bulim	871	B3	↺ Upper Bukit Timah Road	—N/a
Tower Transit Singapore	Bulim	871A	B3	Bukit Batok East Avenue 2 (Blk 240)	Short trip service
Tower Transit Singapore	Bulim	872	B1	↺ Jurong East Street 32	—N/a
Tower Transit Singapore	Bulim	872A	B1	Boon Lay Way (Chinese Garden Station)	Short trip service
Tower Transit Singapore	Bulim	873	B5	↺ Upper Bukit Timah Road	873 and 873M operate as alternating trips
Tower Transit Singapore	Bulim	873M	B5	↺ Bukit Batok Street 52	873 and 873M operate as alternating trips
Tower Transit Singapore	Bulim	874	B6	↺ Choa Chu Kang Avenue 4	—N/a
Tower Transit Singapore	Bulim	992	B2	Bukit Batok	—N/a
