= St Michael's Bus Terminal =

Bus terminal in Novena, Singapore

St Michael's Bus Terminal 圣迈克巴士终站 Terminal Bas St Michael's
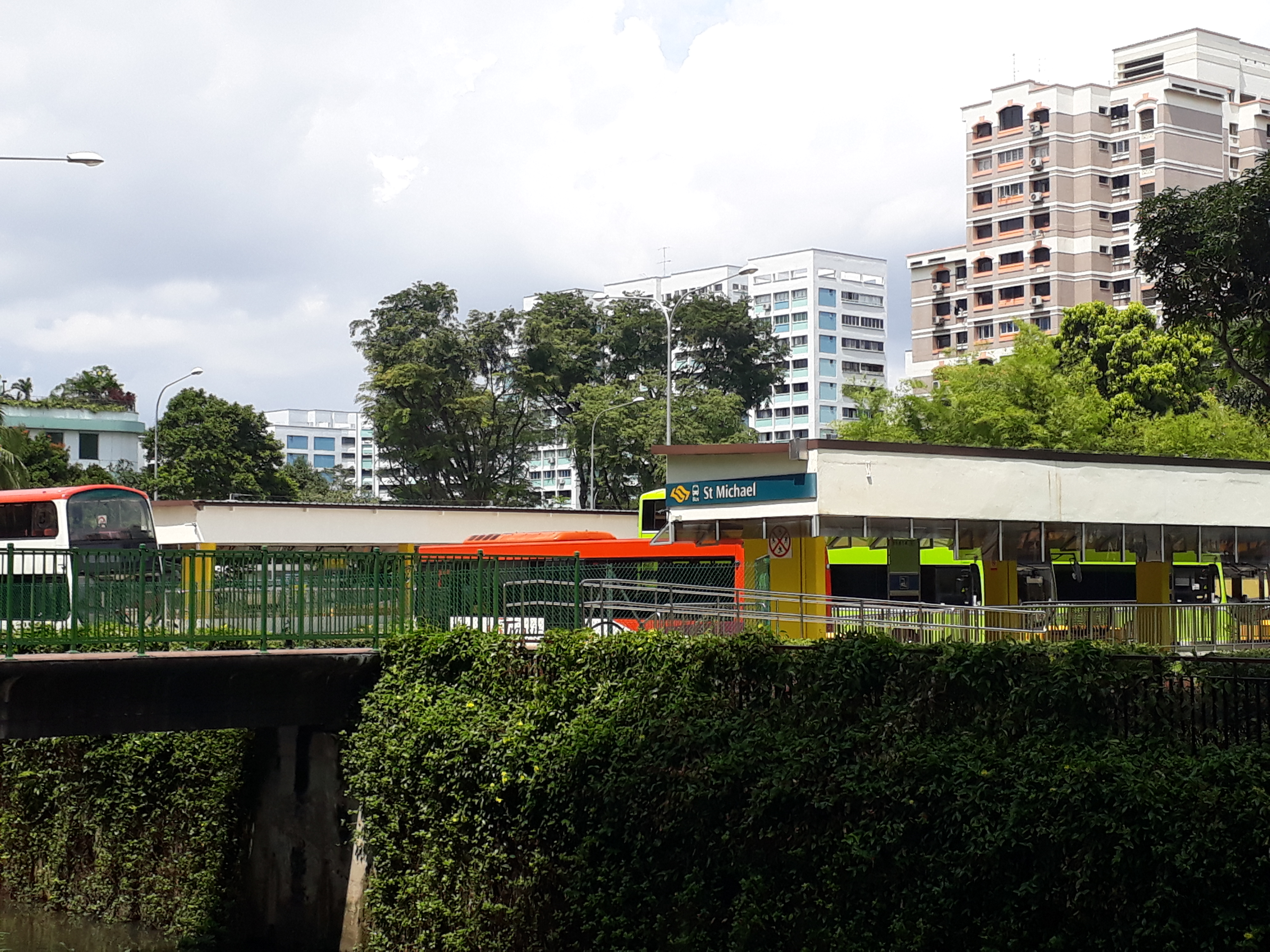

General information
- Location: 10 Whampoa Road, Singapore 327691
- Coordinates: 1°19′33.585″N 103°51′20.202″E
- System: Public Bus Terminal
- Owner: Land Transport Authority
- Operator: SBS Transit (ComfortDelGro)
- Bus routes: 6 (SBS Transit); 1 (Go-Ahead Singapore)
- Bus stands: 6 berths 13 end-on parking lots
- Bus operators: SBS Transit; Go-Ahead Singapore

Construction
- Structure type: At-grade
- Accessible: Accessible alighting/boarding points Accessible public toilets Graduated kerb edges Tactile guidance system

History
- Opened: early-1980s; 45 years ago
Location

St Michael's Bus Terminal (Note: Chinese: 圣迈克巴士终站; pinyin: Shèngmaìkè bāshì zhōngzhàn; Malay: Terminal Bas St Michael's) is a bus terminus in Novena, Singapore. It is located in the subzone of Balestier, between Whampoa River and Whampoa Road, near the junction with Kim Keat Road.

== History ==
Opened sometime between 1980 and 1985, the bus terminal was named after the nearby Saint Michael's Estate neighbourhood at Jalan Tenteram, most of which has since been demolished.

In May 1985, a reader of The Straits Times and Whampoa resident reported on the troublesome amount of smoke and noise generated as a result of buses having to loop around the neighborhood to enter and leave the bus terminal. In October 1995, a few World War II-era bombs were discovered 50 m (160 ft) away from the bus terminal.

In April 2013, as part of the five-year Bus Service Enhancement Programme, a contract worth S$1.69 million was awarded for the upgrading of the bus terminal's facilities.

== Bus contracting model ==
Under the bus contracting model, all bus services operating from St Michael's Bus Terminal were divided into 3 bus packages.

=== List of bus services ===
| Operator | Package | Routes |
|---|---|---|
| Go-Ahead Singapore | Tampines | 129 |
| SBS Transit | Bishan–Toa Payoh | 21, 124, 125, 186, 456 |
| SBS Transit | Bukit Merah | 131, 131A |

== See also ==
- List of bus terminals in Singapore
