= Bukit Merah Bus Interchange =

Bus interchange in Singapore

Bukit Merah Bus Interchange 红山巴士转换站 Pusat Pertukaran Bas Bukit Merah
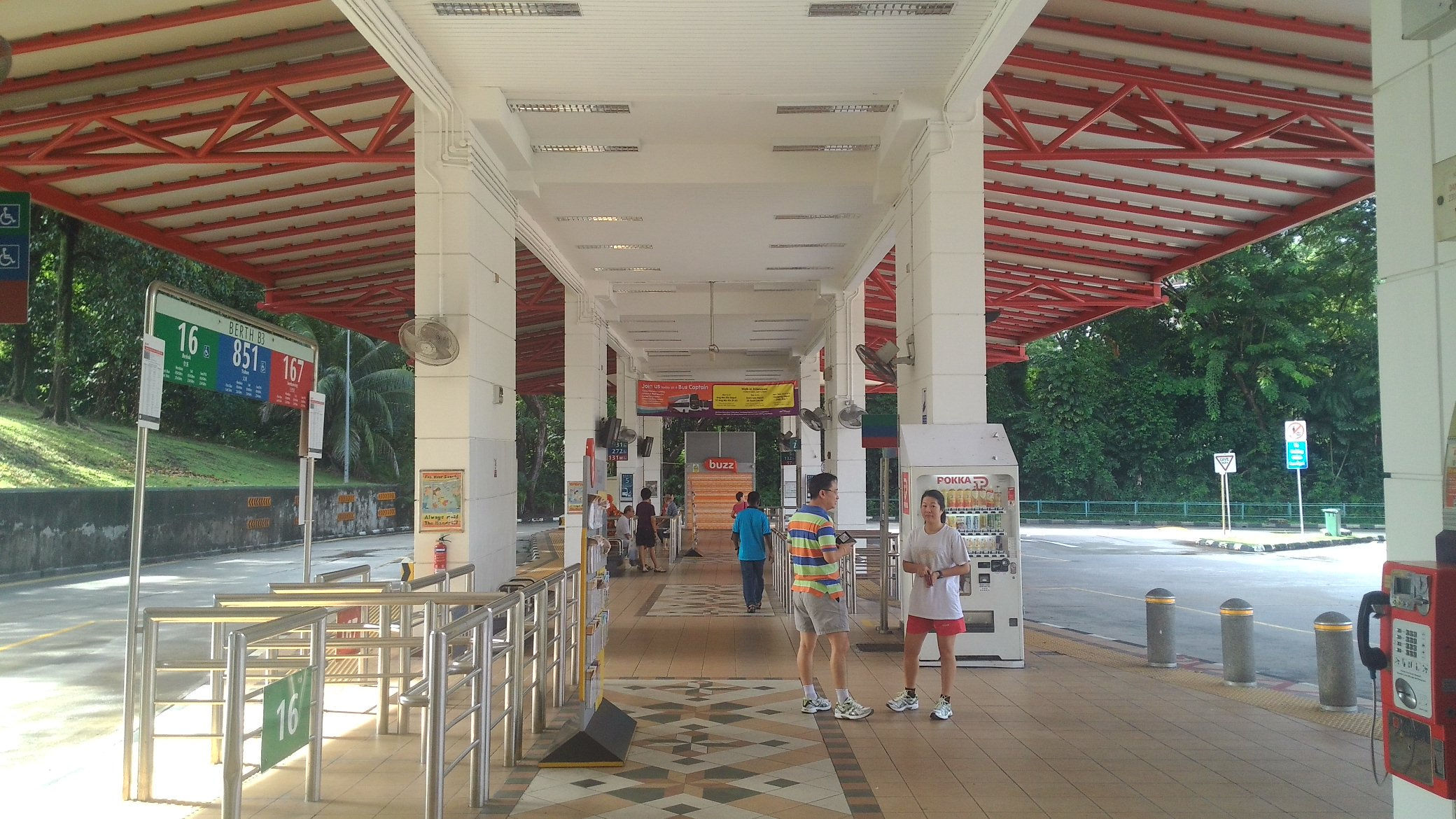
- Interior of Bukit Merah Bus Interchange.

General information
- Location: 3591 Bukit Merah Central, Singapore 159840
- Coordinates: 1°16′55″N 103°49′0″E
- System: Public Bus Interchange
- Owner: Land Transport Authority
- Operator: SBS Transit
- Bus routes: 13 (SBS Transit); 2 (SMRT Buses); 1 (Tower Transit)
- Bus stands: 6 Sawtooth Berths; 2 Alighting Berths
- Bus operators: SBS Transit; SMRT Buses; Tower Transit Singapore
- Connections: Not applicable

Construction
- Structure type: At-grade
- Accessible: Accessible alighting/boarding points Accessible public toilets Graduated kerb edges Tactile guidance system

History
- Opened: 28 September 1980; 46 years ago

Key dates
- 28 September 1980: Commenced operations
Location

Bukit Merah Bus Interchange is a bus interchange located in the Bukit Merah Town Centre in Singapore. The interchange is located along Bukit Merah Central and serves the nearby residential estates of Telok Blangah and Bukit Purmei, as well as the commercial buildings in Bukit Merah Central. It is currently among the few bus interchanges in Singapore that does not have a direct link to an MRT station. However, several services link commuters to nearby MRT stations from the interchange. Services 5, 16 and 851 link the interchange to Tiong Bahru, Service 132 links to Redhill, while Service 176 links to Telok Blangah.

Bukit Merah Bus Interchange is also the oldest currently-operational bus interchange in Singapore that has not been rebuilt since its opening; Bedok Bus Interchange, which opened earlier, was redeveloped into an Integrated Transport Hub (ITH) and reopened on 30 November 2014.

== History ==
The interchange was constructed as part of a scheme to improve bus services in the Telok Blangah area. Operations at the interchange commenced on 28 September 1980, and it was officially opened on 14 February 1981, with Minister without Portfolio Lim Chee Onn attending the ceremony.

== Bus contracting model ==
Under the bus contracting model, all bus services operating from Bukit Merah Bus Interchange were divided into six bus packages, operated by three bus operators.

=== List of bus services ===
Operator	Package	Routes
SBS Transit	Bishan-Toa Payoh	139
SBS Transit	Bukit Merah	5, 16, 16M, 57, 123, 131, 198, 272, 273
SBS Transit	Seletar	851
SBS Transit	Sengkang-Hougang	132, 153
SMRT Buses	Choa Chu Kang-Bukit Panjang	75, 176
Tower Transit Singapore	Sembawang-Yishun	167
