= Alexander Dennis Enviro500 MMC =

3-axle double-decker bus

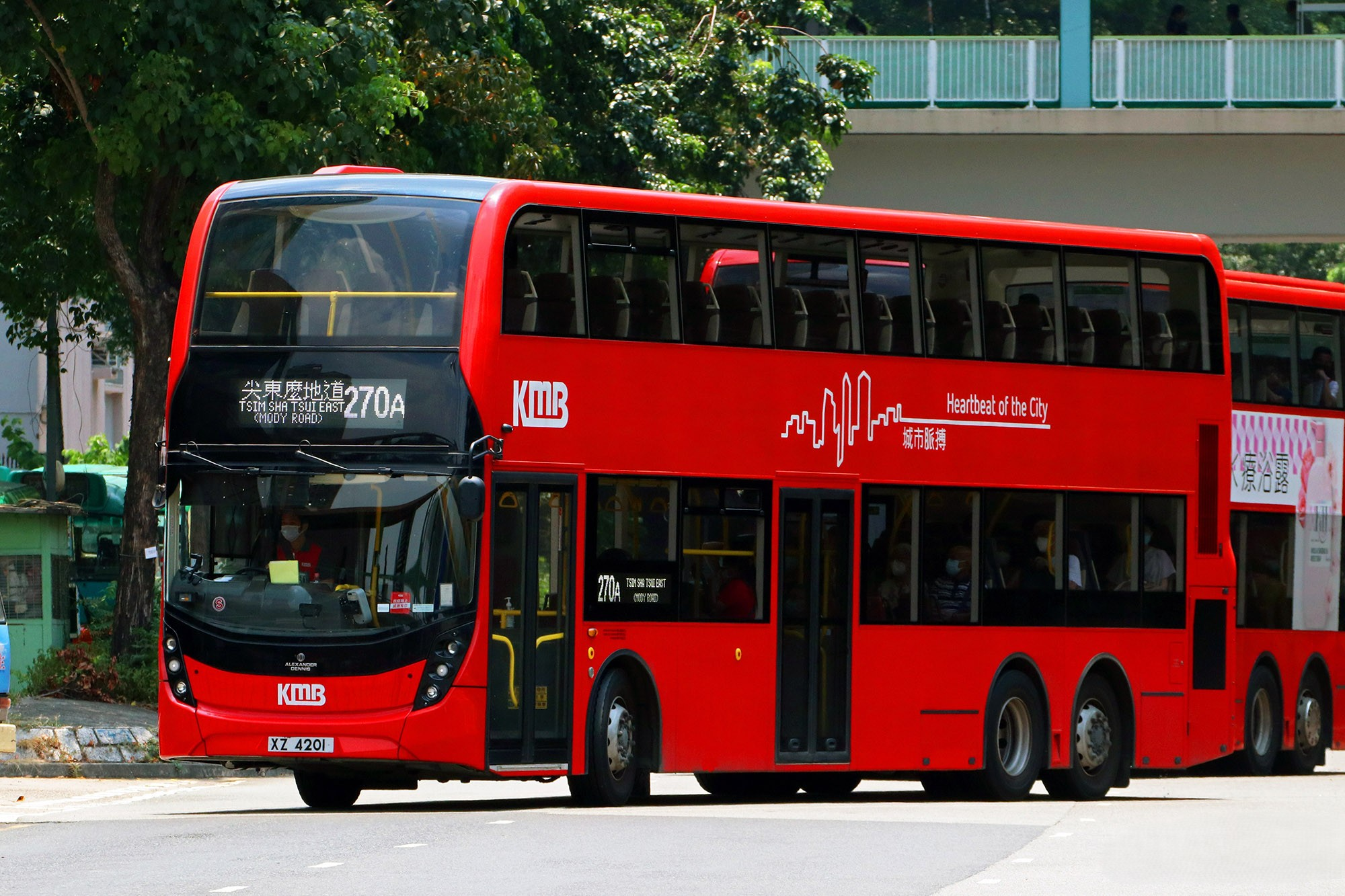
- Kowloon Motor Bus facelifted Enviro500 MMC in 2022

Overview
- Manufacturer: Alexander Dennis
- Production: 2012–present

Body and chassis
- Doors: 2 or 3 doors
- Floor type: Low floor
- Chassis: Alexander Dennis Enviro500 (Trident E500 Turbo)
- Related: Alexander Dennis Enviro400 MMC; Alexander Dennis Enviro500EV

Powertrain
- Engine: Cummins ISLe/ISL/ISBe/L9; Mercedes-Benz OM936 LA
- Power output: 280hp/330hp/340hp/380hp (Cummins); 349hp (Mercedes-Benz)
- Transmission: Voith DIWA 864.5; Voith DIWA 864.6; Allison B500R; ZF EcoLife 6AP 1700B

Dimensions
- Length: 11.3 m (37 ft 1 in), 12 m (39 ft 4 in), 12.5 m (41 ft 0 in) and 12.8 m (42 ft 0 in) (up to 13.8 m (45 ft 3 in))
- Width: 2.5 m (8 ft 2 in), 2.545 m (8 ft 4.2 in) and 2.55 m (8 ft 4 in)
- Height: 3.9 m (12 ft 10 in), 4.1 m (13 ft 5 in), 4.2 m (13 ft 9 in), and 4.4 m (14 ft 5 in)

Chronology
- Predecessor: Alexander Dennis Enviro500

The Alexander Dennis Enviro500 MMC (sold as the Alexander Dennis Enviro500) is a low-floor, three-axle double-decker bus produced by the British bus manufacturer Alexander Dennis since 2012, replacing the Alexander Dennis Enviro500. The Enviro500 MMC is available powered by either Euro 6 diesel or hybrid-electric powertrains.

== Design ==
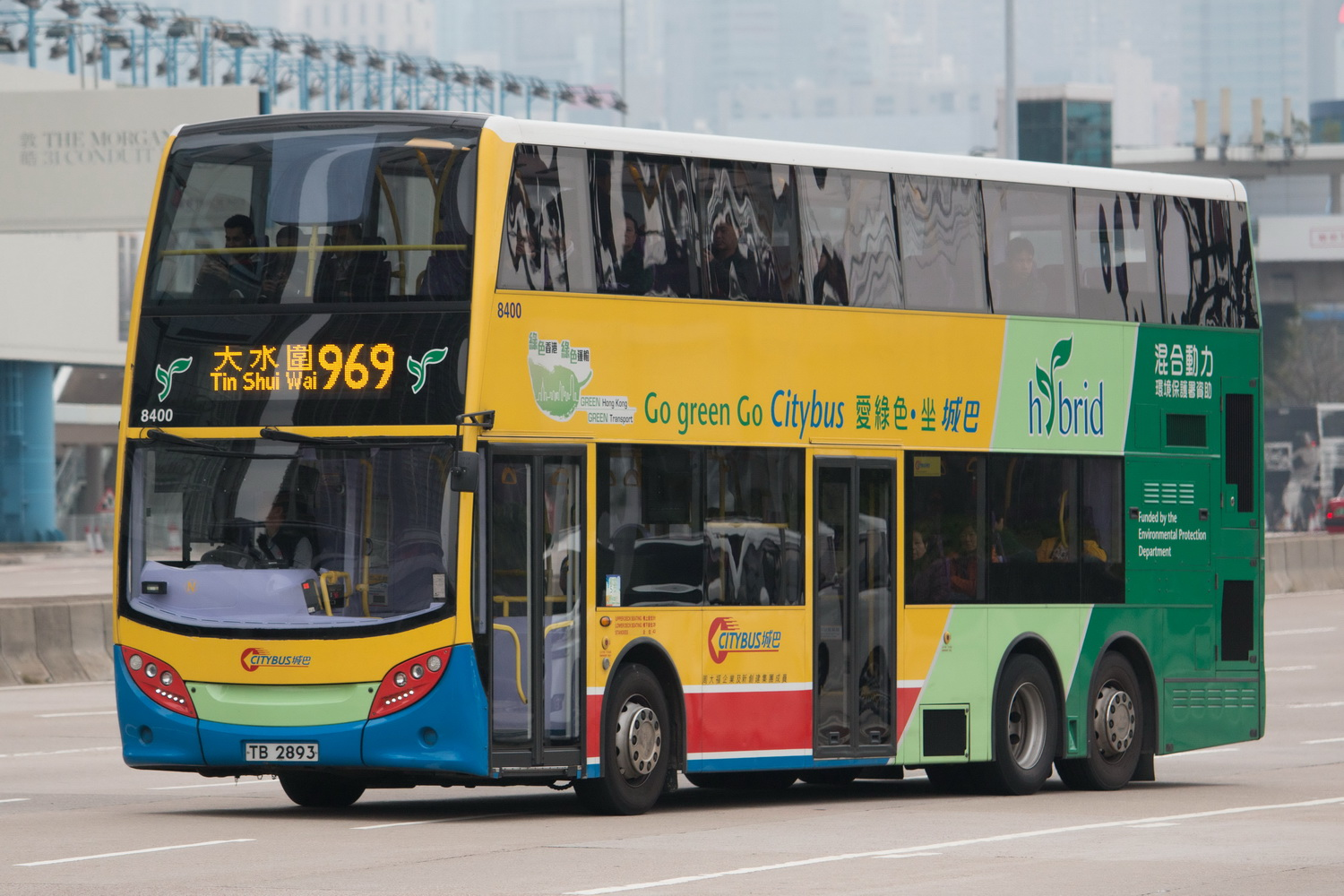
Citybus's Enviro500 MMC hybrid energy bus.

In 2012, Alexander Dennis unveiled a new generation Enviro500 (also known as the Enviro500 MMC) with a new chassis design. The chassis (also known as the Trident E500 Turbo and E50D/E50H) had the longitudinally-mounted engine and gearbox slightly offset to the left. The Cummins ISLe engine was retained, with choices of a six-speed ZF Ecolife 6AP 1700B with TopoDyn life and four-speed Voith DIWA 864.5 gearbox. Like the Enviro400 with straight staircase, the shape of fuel tank was specifically adopted to be mounted under the staircase. All the axles utilised were supplied by ZF instead of Dana.

The bodywork was also redesigned, with a more angular front-end design based on the Hong Kong version of the Enviro400. It has a new design of staircase known by Alexander Dennis as the "Square-Case", whose size was similar to that of the spiral staircase but with all steps being rectangular shaped.

A hybrid-electric version of this bus model with a Cummins ISBe engine and the BAE Systems HybriDrive series hybrid system had been built in small numbers.

=== New bodywork ===
Later in 2014, Alexander Dennis unveiled the second generation Enviro500 MMC in North America, with a new design of bodywork similar with the Enviro400 MMC launched earlier that year, featuring rounded top edges and a vertically oriented headlamp cluster. This bodywork design was also adopted by the Enviro500s built for Hong Kong since 2015.

Two versions of the new bodywork Enviro500 have been developed for the North American market: the standard 4.1 m (13 ft 5 3/8 in) height model with a length of 12.9 m (42 ft 3 7/8 in), and a new, lower-height 3.9 m (12 ft 9 1/2 in) Super-Lo variant with a longer length of 13.8 m (45 ft 3 1/4 in), designed for high-capacity, interurban transport.

=== Electric variant ===
Alexander Dennis announced the launch of a battery electric variant of its Enviro500 MMC in 2021 for the North American market, marketed as the 'Enviro500EV Charge', with another variant with revised bodywork and an integral battery electric drivetrain for the Asia and Oceania market, alternatively marketed as the 'Enviro500EV NG', later announced in August 2022.

== Orders ==
=== Asia and Oceania ===
==== Hong Kong ====
===== Citybus =====
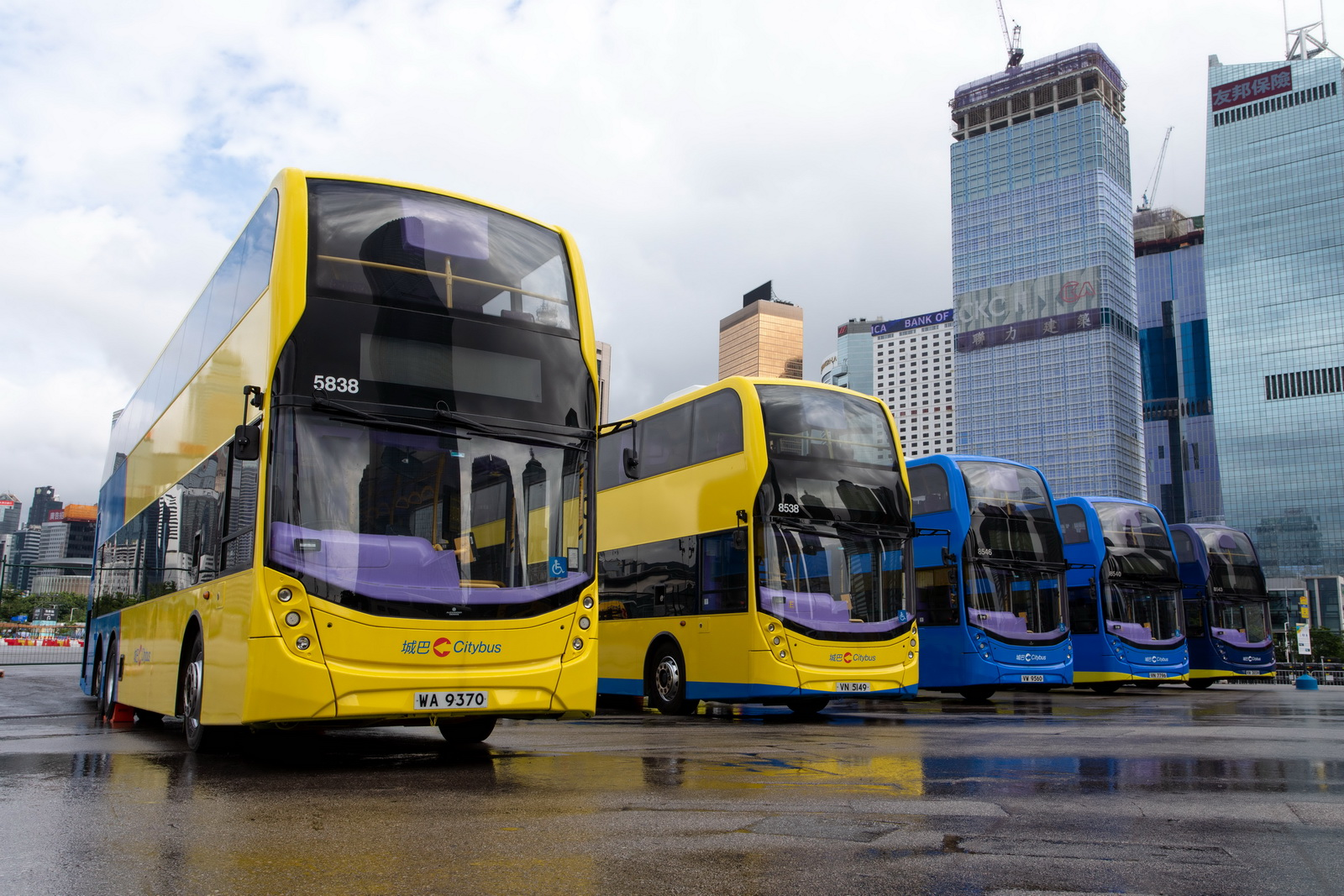
A lineup of facelifted Citybus Enviro500 MMCs.

Citybus ordered one new generation Enviro500 in 2011 – 8320 (in conjunction with the 115 older Enviro500), soon followed by further order of 155. 107 of these were for the 12 metre version, including 66 fitted with airport coach specifications (8000-8065) while the rest were standard passenger buses (8321-8360). The other 49 were 11.3 metres (9100-9148). The first 4 airport coaches entered service in March 2013 and in 2014. Citybus ordered a further 104 new generation Enviro500s which were all the 12-metre (39 ft 4 1/2 in) version and possess a high seating capacity for 90 passengers, 8361 to 8399 and 8402 to 8466. In mid 2014, Citybus received a 12.8-metre long (41 ft 11 7/8 in) Enviro500 demonstrator, 6300, and became the second operator in Hong Kong after KMB to receive such a model. Later that year, the operator received 2 hybrid versions of the Enviro500, 8400 and 8401, becoming the third operator of such a type in Hong Kong.

===== Kowloon Motor Bus =====
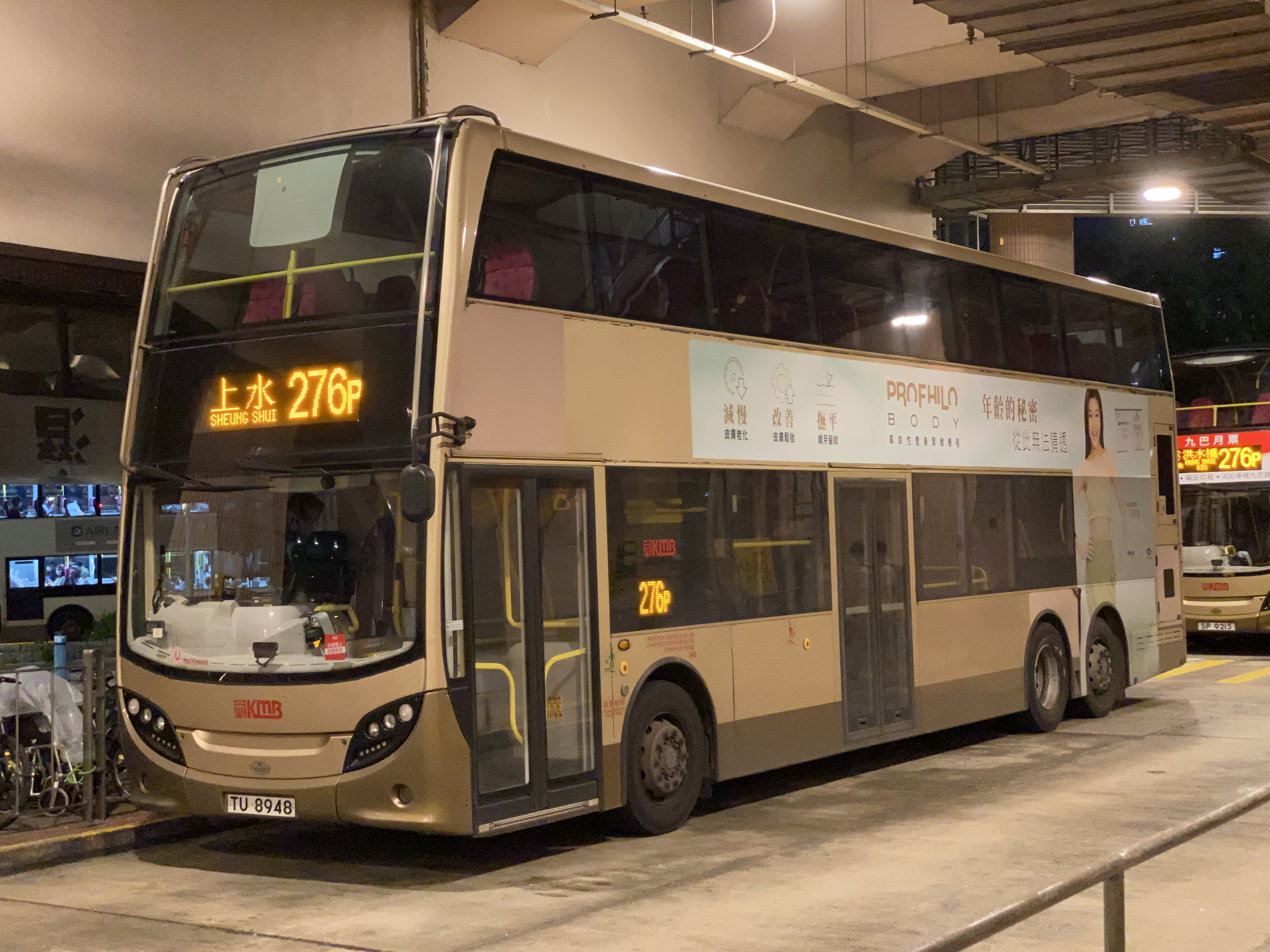
A Kowloon Motor Bus first generation Enviro500 MMC

Kowloon Motor Bus ordered 329 new generation Enviro500 in 2012, with the first bus exhibited at the Euro Bus Expo 2012 at the National Exhibition Centre, Birmingham and delivered in February 2013.

Placement of subsequent orders increased the total to over 2,200, including 1652 12.0 metre Euro V version (ATENU), 222 12.8 metre-long Euro V version (3ATENU), two 12.0 metre Euro VI version (E6T), 301 12.8 metre-long Euro VI version (E6X), and 101 11.3 metre Euro VI version (E6M).

In 2014, KMB received three hybrid version Enviro500 (ATH1-ATH3) as the first hybrid electric double-deckers received by the company.

===== Long Win Bus =====
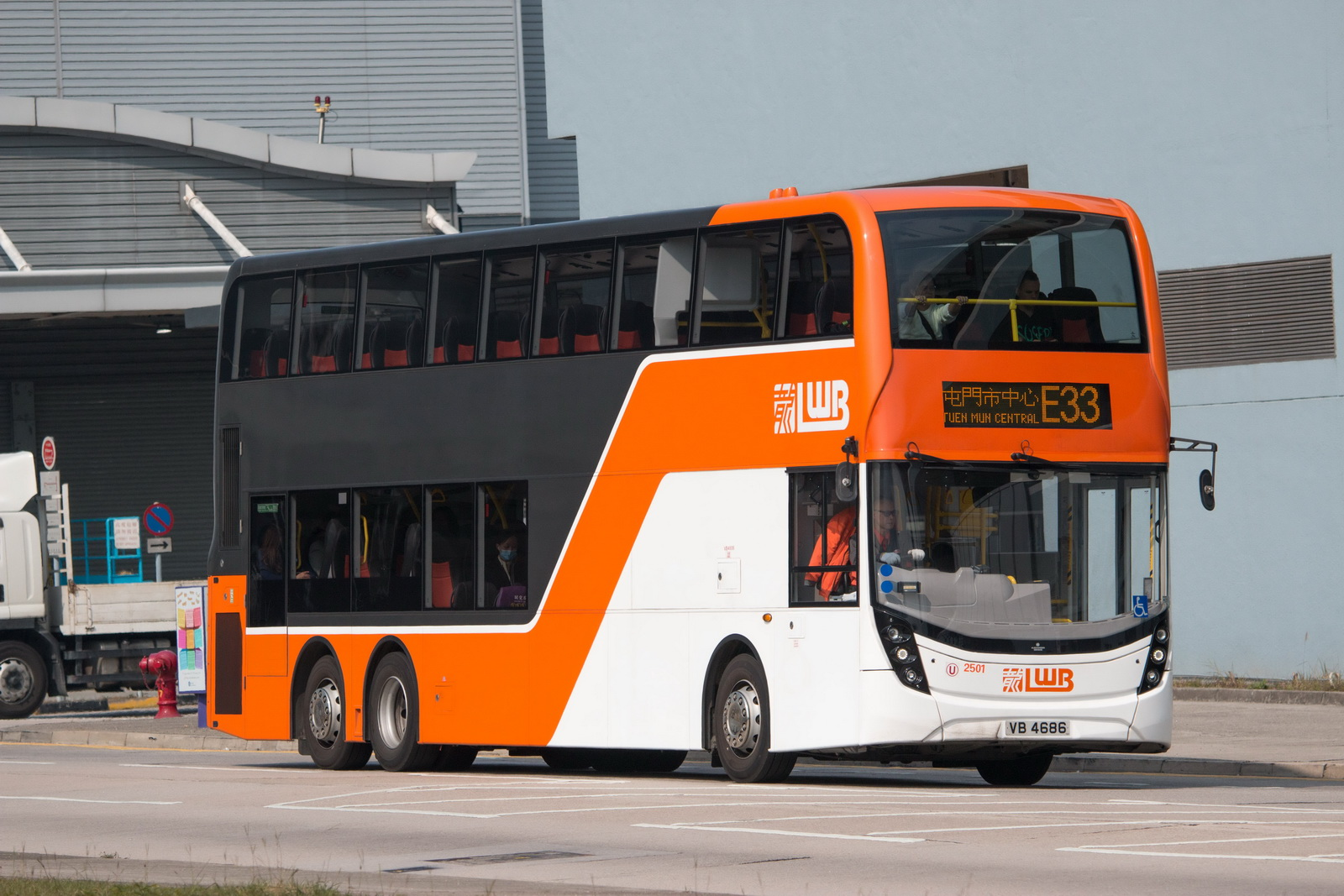
A facelifted Enviro 500 MMC operated by Long Win Bus

Long Win Bus ordered 22 new generation Enviro500 in 2012, with a further 19 buses diverted from KMB order and follow by another 6 buses. In 2014, LWB placed a further order of 26 new generation Enviro500 with airport coach specification. A further batch of 91 was ordered in 2015 including 40 12 metre buses and 51 12.8 metre-long and another batch of 62 more was ordered in 2016 with 50 12 metre buses and 12 12.8 metre-long buses.

Due to a surplus in Long Win's fleet, 16 of the first batch of buses were transferred to KMB in 2020.

===== MTR Bus =====
MTR Bus ordered 6 11.3 metre new generation Enviro500 in 2012, which were delivered and entered service in 2013. Before the 6 new generation Enviro500 were registered, MTR ordered more 28 11.3 metre new generation Enviro500 which were delivered and entered service in 2014 and 2015. Then 8 more delivered and entered service in 2017 and 2018.

===== New World First Bus =====
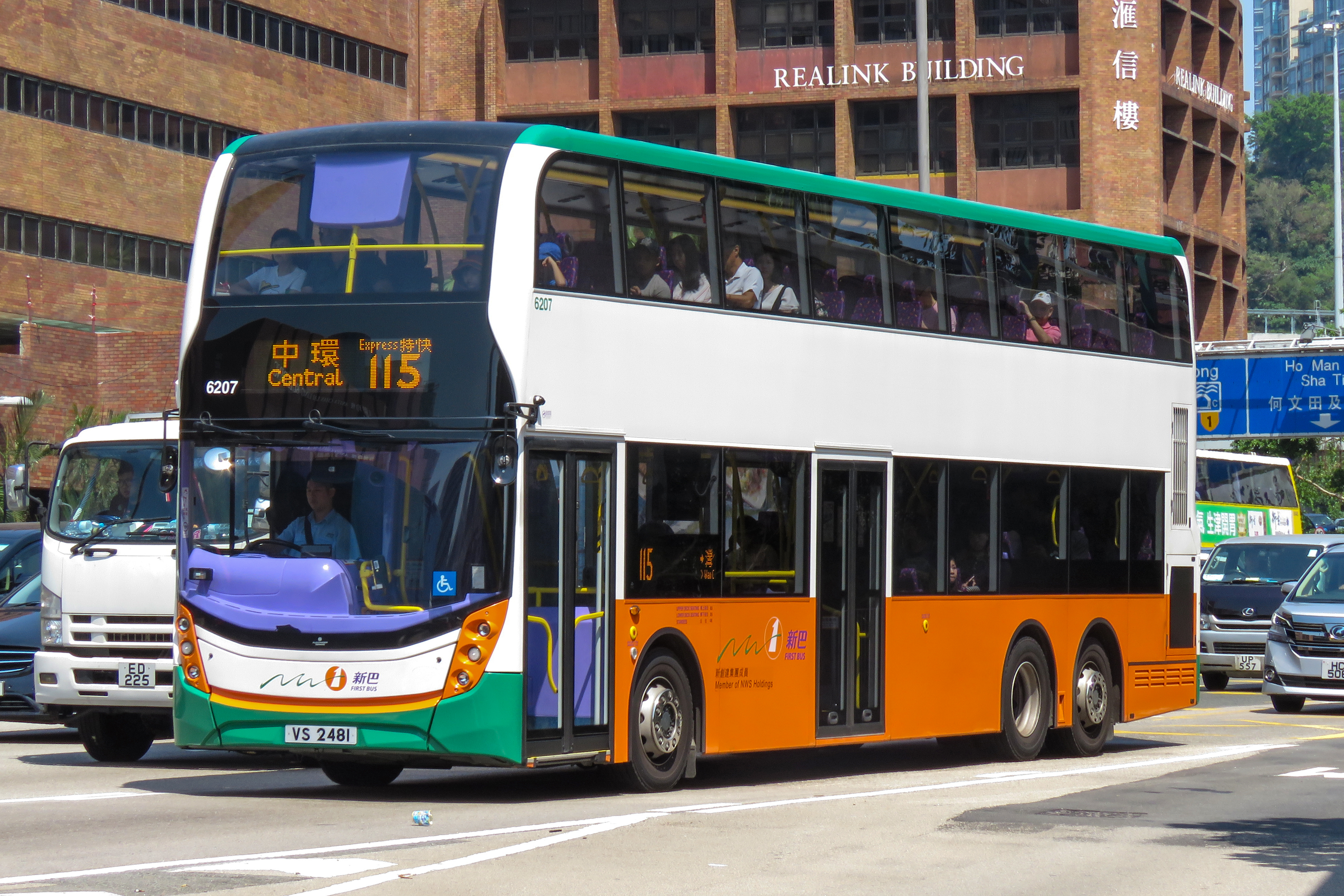
NWFB Enviro500 MMC with Euro VI engine

New World First Bus ordered 12 new generation Enviro500 in 2013, they are all 11.3 metre buses. The buses (4040-4051) were in service between 2013 and 2014.

In 2014, NWFB ordered another 87 Enviro500 (5583-5669), all of them were 12 metre version. One hybrid-powered Enviro500 (fleet no. 5600) was also received in the same year, becoming the second operator receiving hybrid version.

In 2016, NWFB received further 50 more 12 metre Enviro500 (5670-5719) followed by 76 more 12.8 metre-long Enviro500 (6100-6175) and another 40 more 11.3 metre version (4052-4091) in 2017, but with restyled front and rear of the bus.

In 2017, NWFB received 22 12.8 metre-long Enviro500 (6176-6197) between 2017 and 2018.

In 2018, NWFB received further 90 12 metre Enviro500s (5750-5839) and 12 12.8 metre-long Enviro500s (6198-6209) with Euro VI engine.

===== CLP Group =====
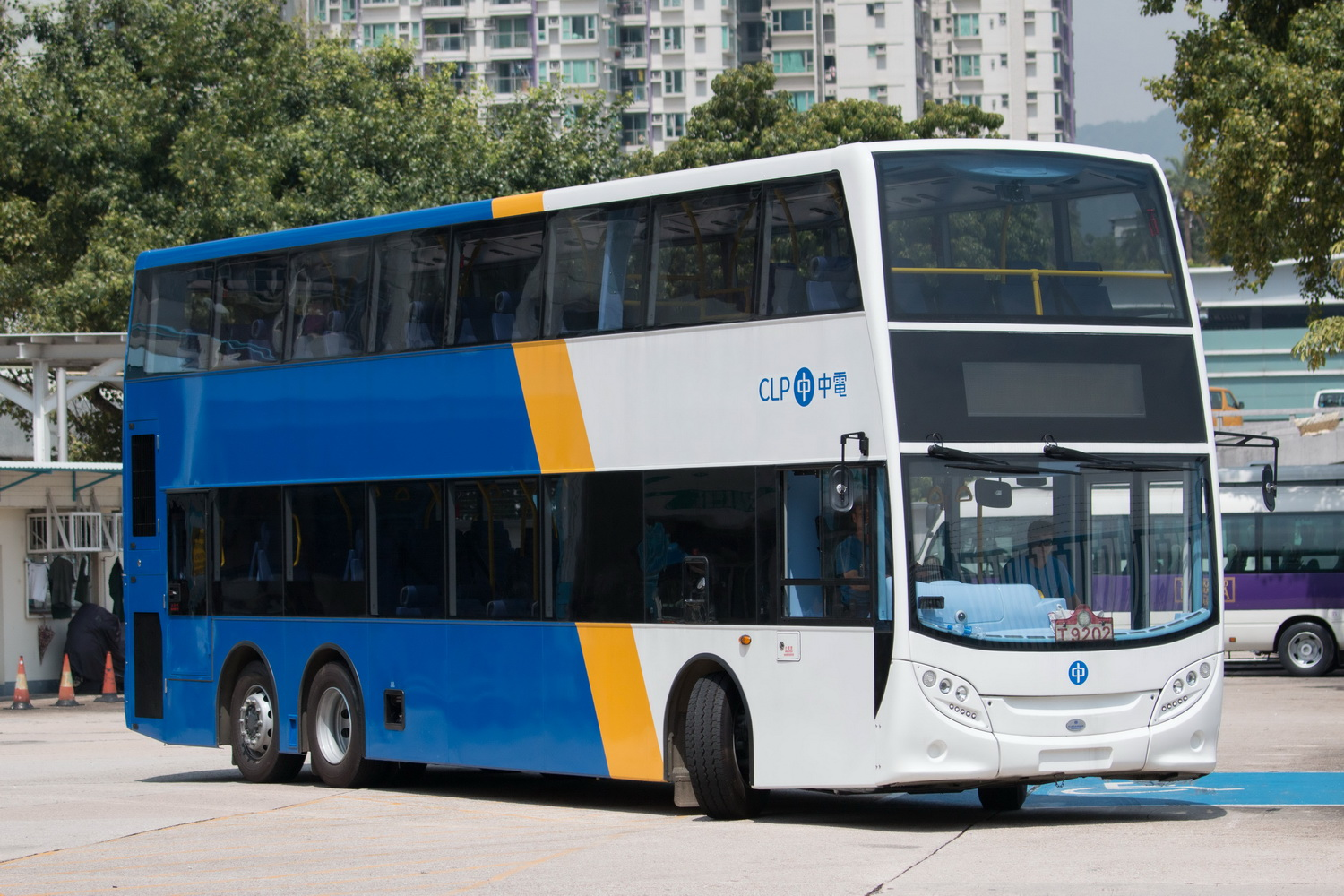
CLP Group Enviro500 MMC

The CLP Group's bus operation ordered one Enviro500 to replace one older Enviro500 that had been written off after an accident. It was delivered in late 2015.

==== Singapore ====
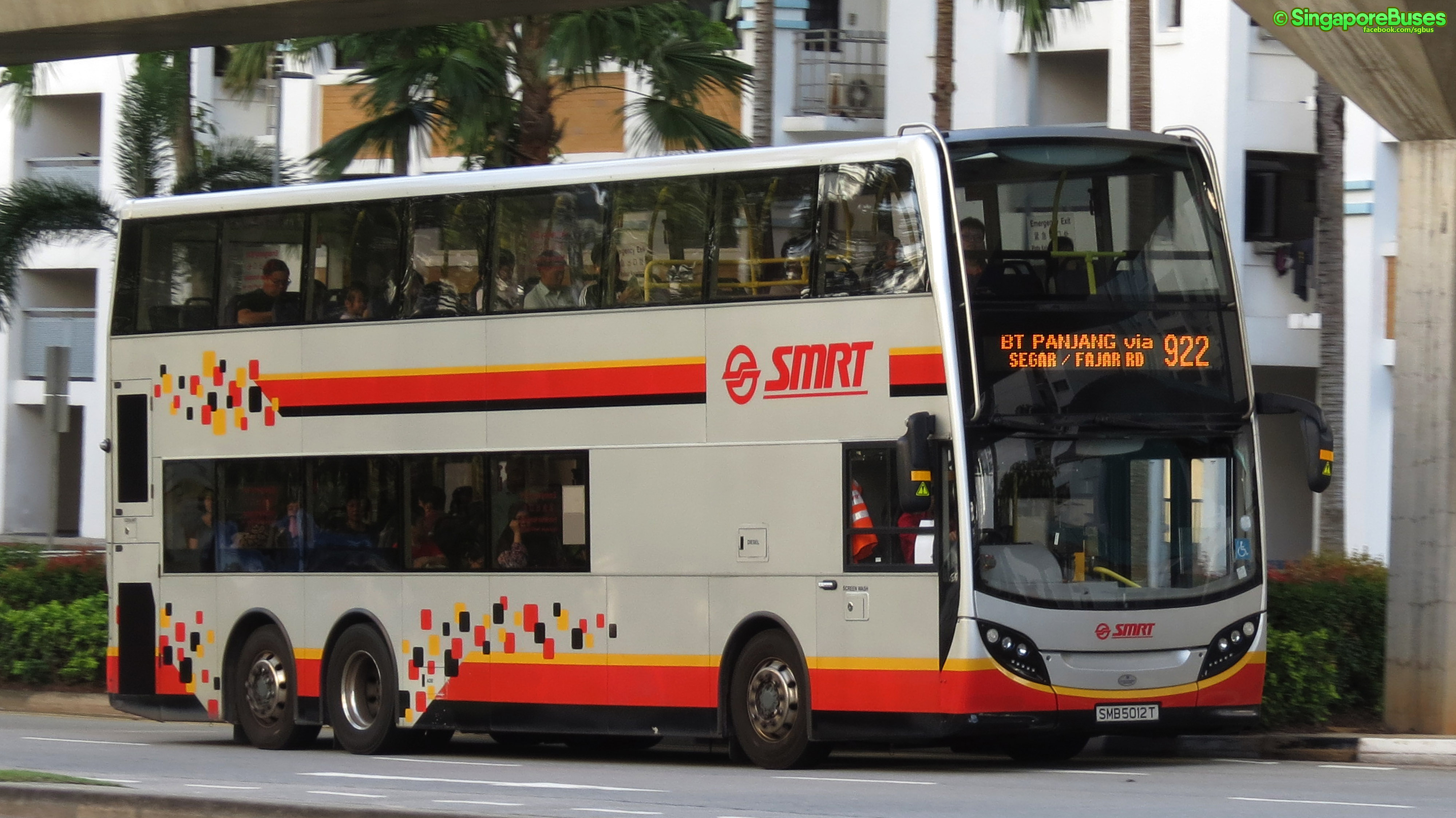
A first generation Enviro500 MMC by SMRT Buses

SMRT Buses

SMRT Buses initially ordered 103 Enviro500 MMC double deckers in 2012 for delivery in 2014 but the order was expanded to 201 in total in January 2014, with an additional 98 buses to be used for Land Transport Authority (LTA)'s Bus Service Enhancement Programme (BSEP). On Sunday 13 July 2014, the first 3 double decker buses made their debut on Bus 972. these buses were powered by Cummins ISL8.9E5340B engine (8,849cc) and fitted with a ZF Ecolife 6AP 1700B 6-speed automatic transmission with TopoDyn life program control software system.

Bus Contracting Model (BCM)

As part of the Bus Contracting Model, some of the Enviro500 MMCs were transferred to Tower Transit Singapore under the Bulim bus package in May 2016. Some of these buses were repainted into the lush green livery. More units of Enviro500 MMCs were transferred to Tower Transit under the Sembawang-Yishun Bus Package in September and October 2021.

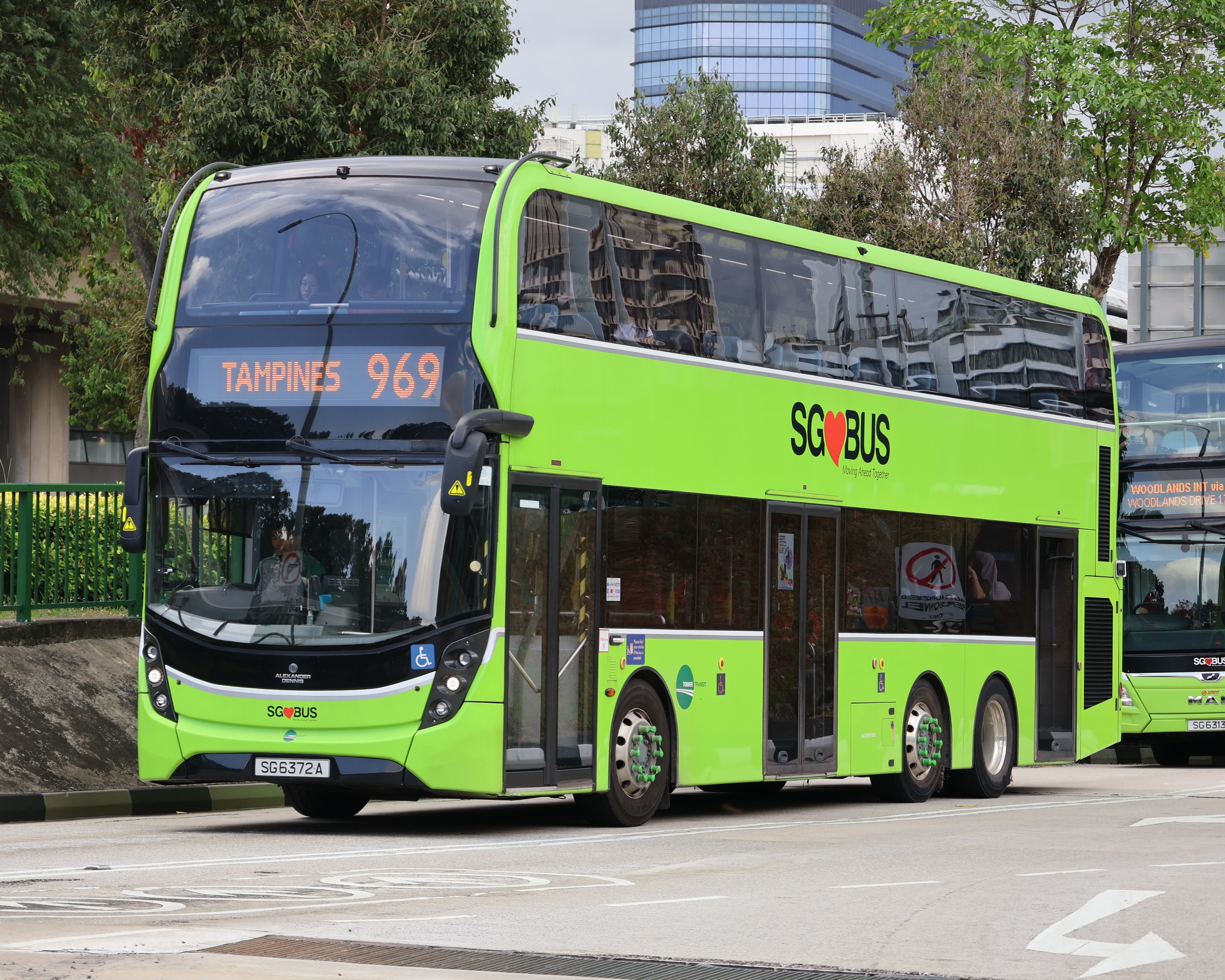
A second generation Enviro500 MMC with 3 doors and 2 staircases operated by Tower Transit Singapore

A mock-up of restyled 13-metre long (42 ft 7 3/4 in) Enviro500 MMC concept bus with 3 doors and 2 staircases was also built for the Land Transport Authority.

On 26 October 2021, the first three-door and two-staircase Enviro500 MMCs of the batch of 50 sets, they were entered service debut on Bus 190 and 974. These buses are fitted with 4-speed Voith DIWA 864.6 automatic transmission, and Mercedes-Benz OM936 LA engine (7,697cc), instead of the Cummins engine found on earlier two batches of Alexander Dennis Enviro500 MMCs, and are built to a fully low-floor design, in comparison to the earlier batches of MAN ND323F A95s. Like the similar ones to identical used on Hong Kong franchised bus companies specifications Alexander Dennis Enviro500s. During their service debut, all three buses experienced various mechanical issues, including engines overheating and issues with air pressure and centre doors.

==== Malaysia ====
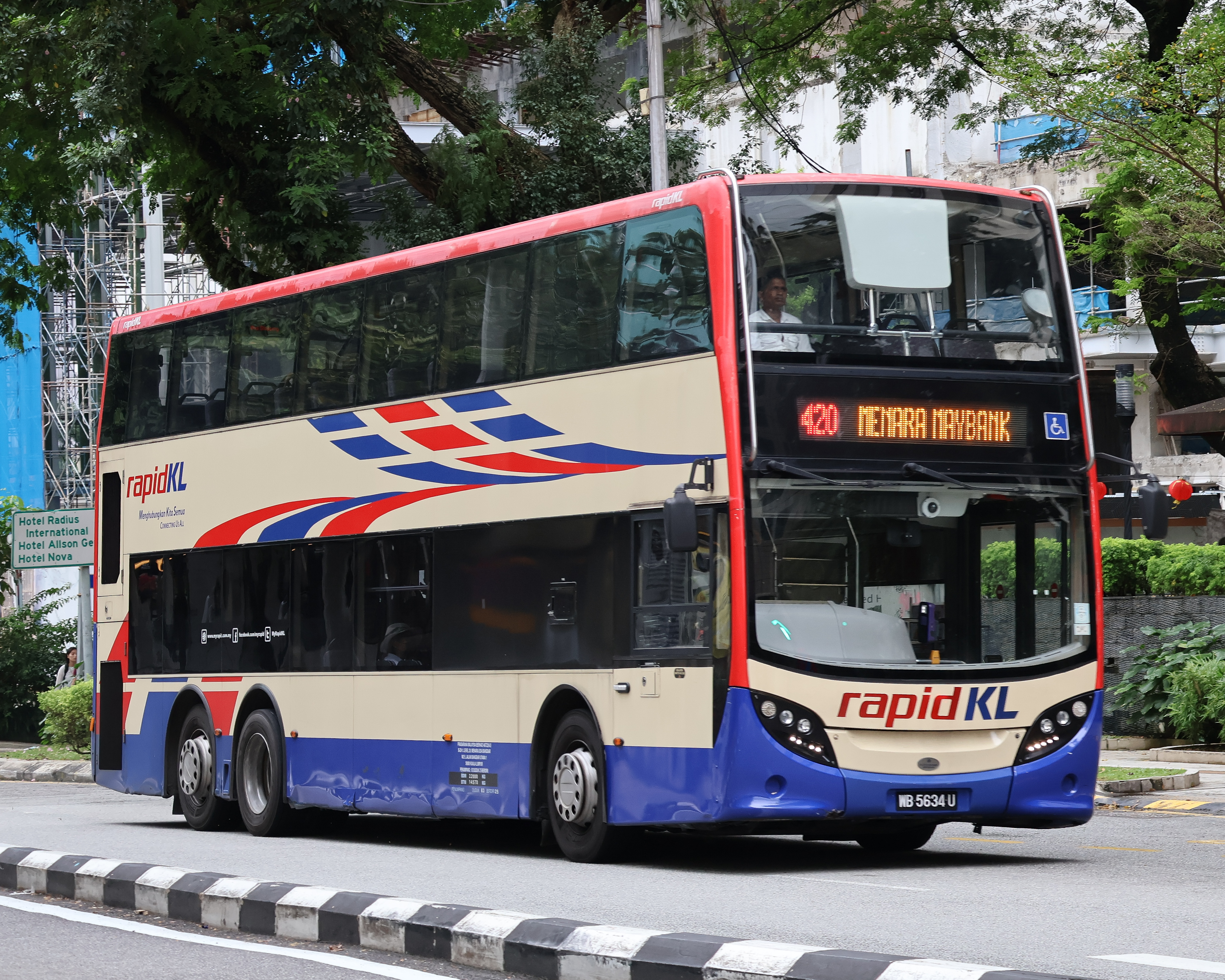
A first generation Enviro500 MMC operated by Rapid Bus

In Malaysia, Prasarana Malaysia ordered 40 Euro 3 engine Enviro500 buses for Rapid KL's Rapid Bus service. The buses serve high capacity routes around the Klang Valley, especially from Cheras and Shah Alam to the capital city of Kuala Lumpur as well as the inner routes in the city centre. A further three Enviro500s entered service on Penang's Rapid Bus routes in August 2016, before they were transferred to Rapid KL following unsatisfactory results. They were reintroduced to Rapid Penang in February 2022.

==== New Zealand ====
New Zealand operators began purchasing Enviro500s in 2015. The following operators have purchased the type:

- Howick & Eastern: 19
- NZ Bus: Auckland – 23 (2016), 54 (2018); Wellington – 17 (2018, delayed entry into service until 2019)
- Birkenhead Transport: 8
- Ritchies Transport Holdings: 23 (1356-1369 AT NEX livery; 1370-1378 AT Metro livery).
- Mana Coach Services (under Newlands branding): 6 (2018)

Some were assembled locally by Kiwi Bus Builders.

=== North America ===
==== United States ====
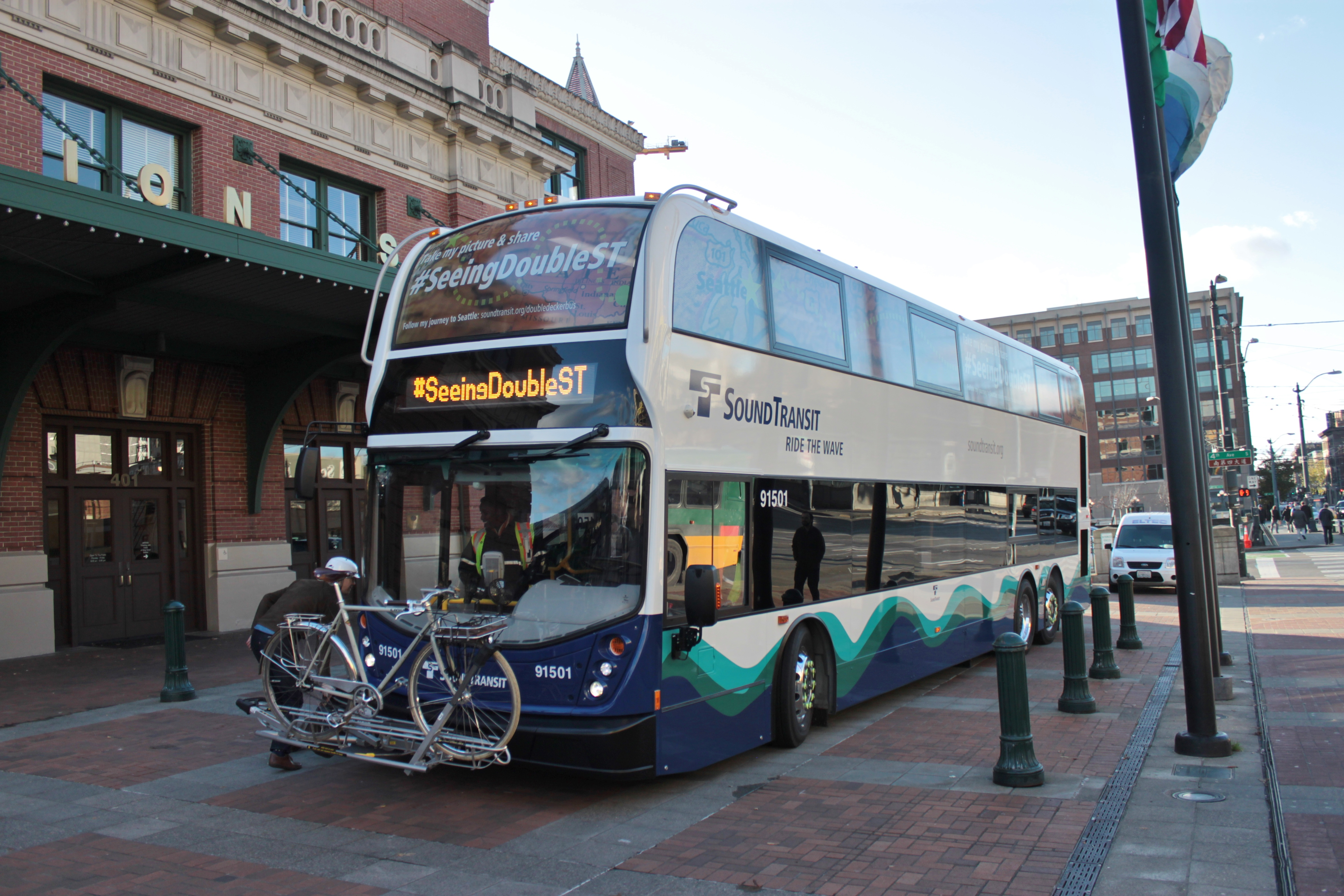
Sound Transit's first Double-decker bus on display at Union Station in Seattle, Washington.

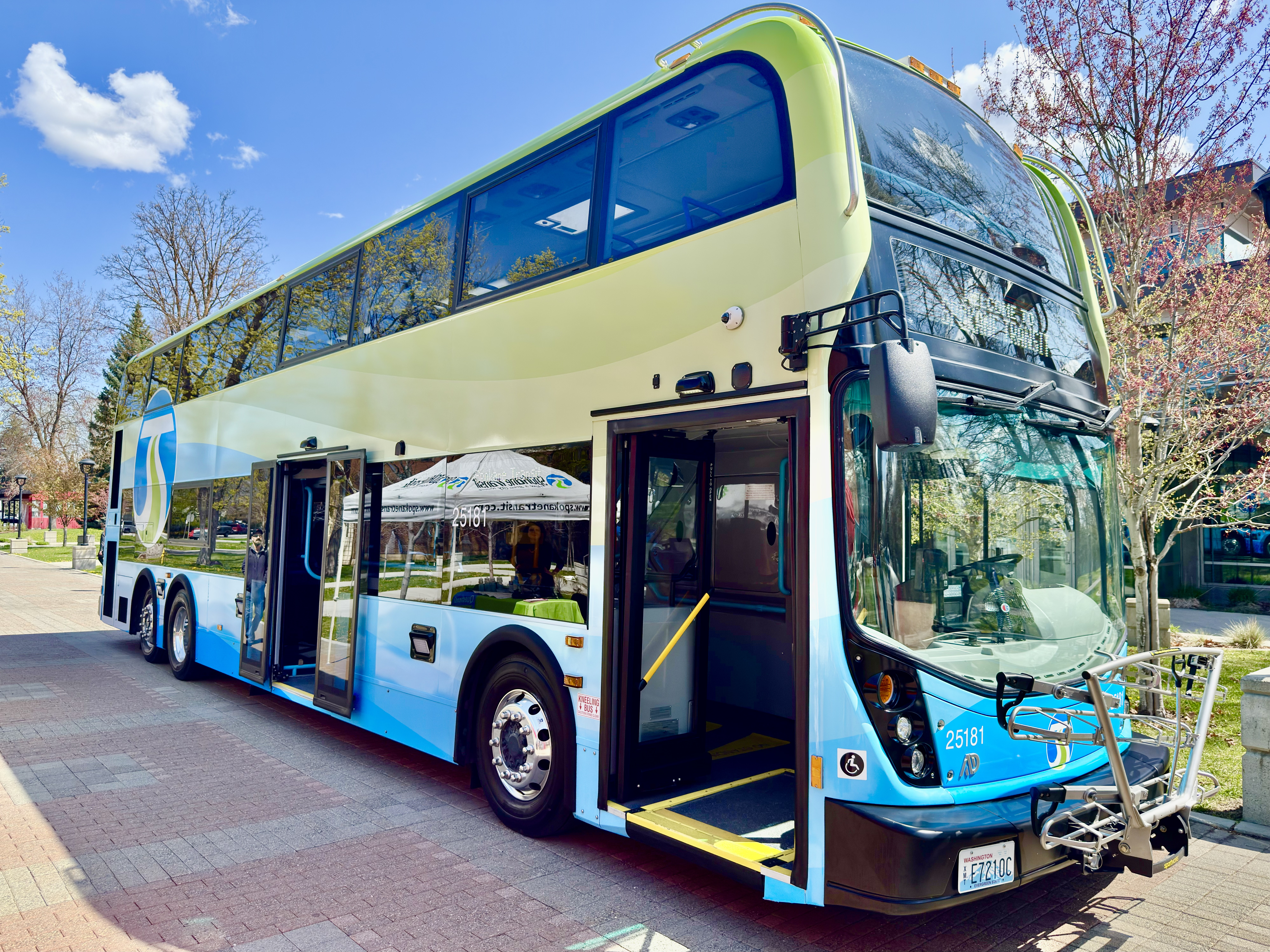
Spokane Transit Enviro500 at Eastern Washington University in April 2025.

Enviro500 MMCs produced in the United States are made under the title of 'USA Standard' instead of MMC. Production of these models has taken place since September 2014 in a newly opened facility originally owned by Ameritrans Bus, Inc. in Nappanee, Indiana. By December 2016, Alexander Dennis took over all manufacturing operations within the facility and added a second body assembly line to increase production. A second factory owned and operated by Alexander Dennis was opened in North Las Vegas, Nevada to assemble Enviro500 MMCs in August 2025.

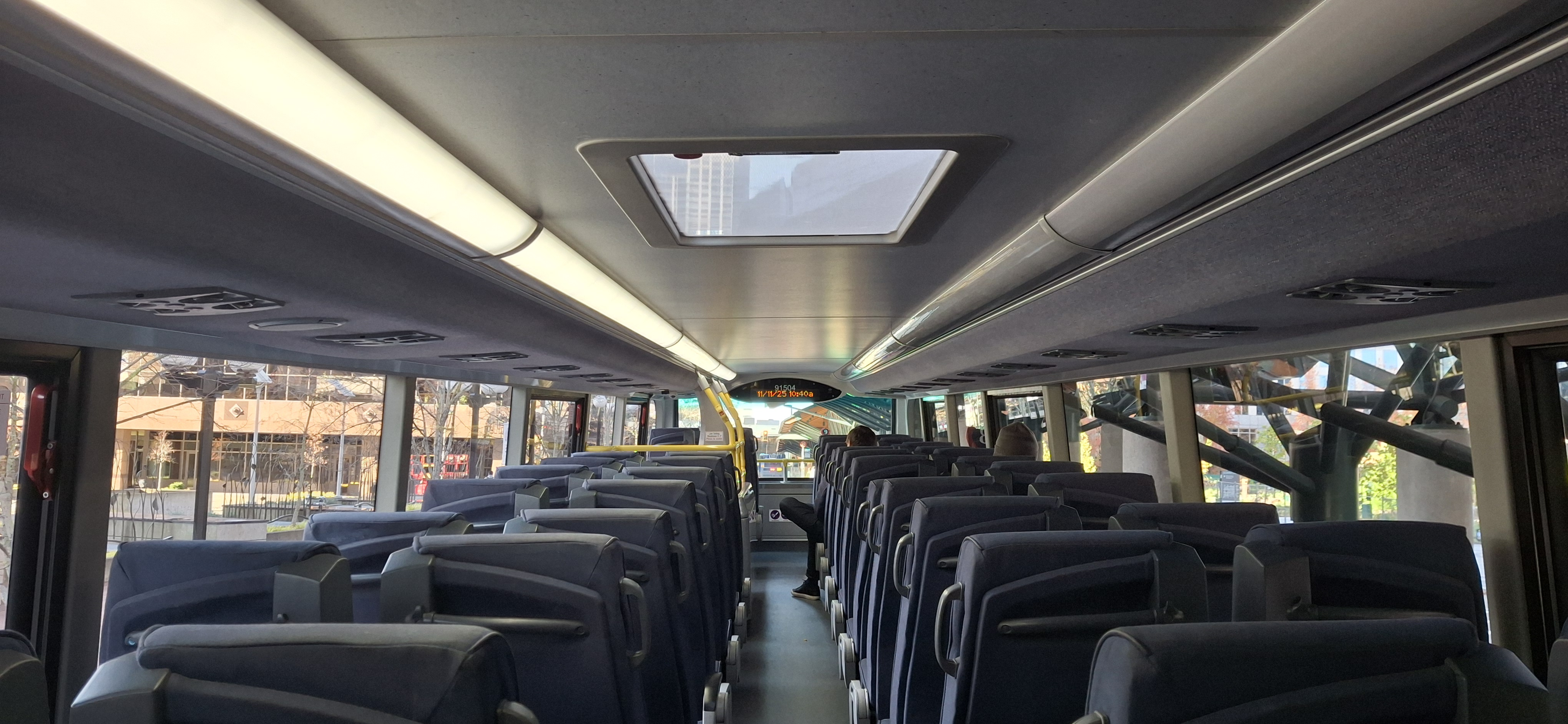
The top floor of a Sound Transit Enviro500 MMC

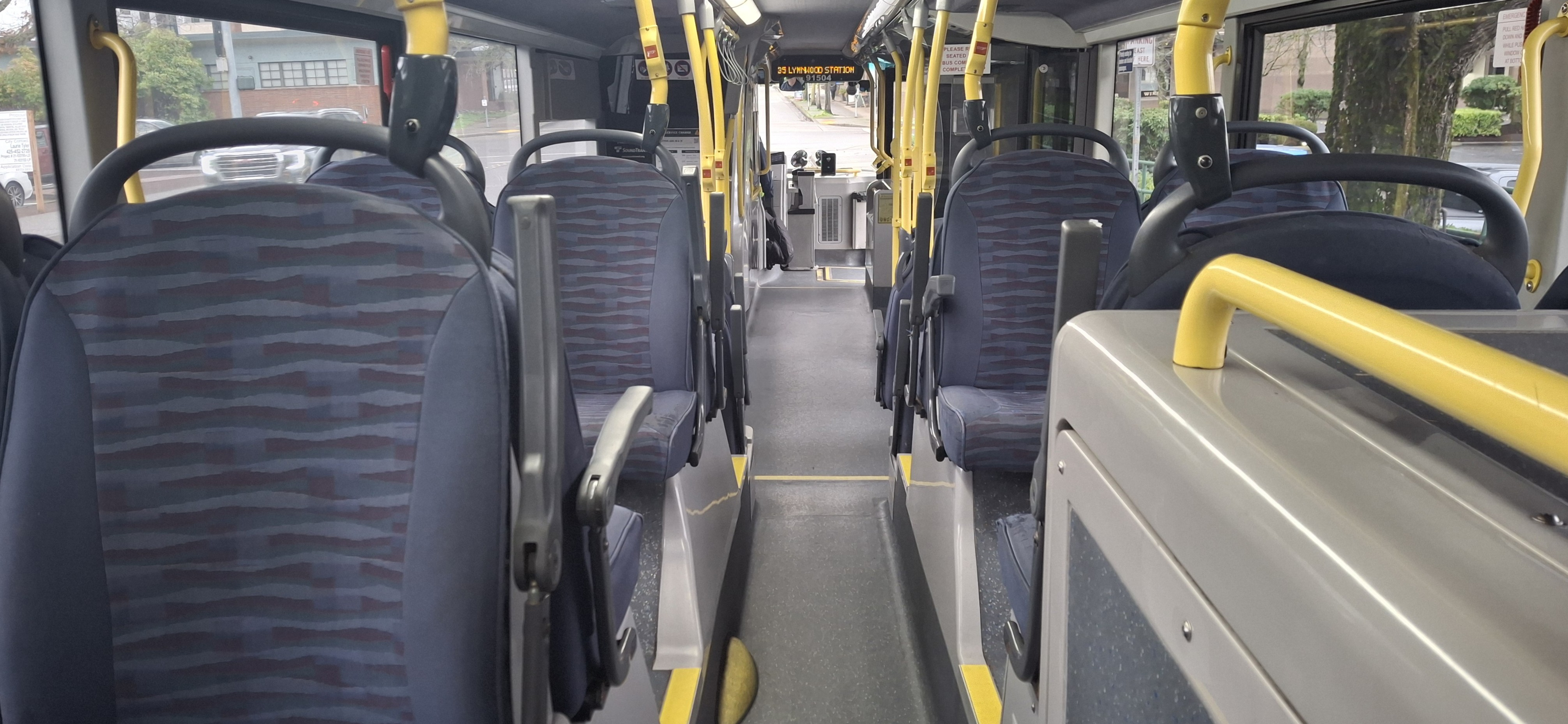
The bottom floor of a Sound Transit Enviro500 MMC

As for operators, Community Transit in Snohomish County, Washington currently has a fleet of 62 Enviro500 coaches, including 39 Enviro500 'USA Standard' coaches. After its initial order of 23 Enviro500 coaches proved to be well suited for the agencies commuter routes with direct peak-hour service to Downtown Seattle, the agency placed orders for 17 more Enviro500 'USA Standard' coaches in 2013, 5 more in 2014, and 17 more in 2016.

At the same time as Community Transit placed its order, neighboring agency Sound Transit, the regional operator in Seattle, also ordered five Enviro500 'USA Standard' coaches. The agency used the coaches to test their suitability for use Sound Transit Express routes. After proving to be successful, Sound Transit placed an order for an additional 32 Enviro500 'USA Standard' coaches in 2016 which would replace 32 articulated buses loaned from Sound Transit to Community Transit. Another order for 13 buses followed in 2018. The Enviro500s were first introduced on commuter routes between Snohomish County and Seattle, and later expanded service to Bellevue. All are operated by Community Transit.

Kitsap Transit has ordered 11 Enviro500 'USA Standard' coaches to provide higher-capacity on its busiest ferry feeder services after demonstrations in 2013 and 2015.

After a successful pilot in 2015, AC Transit awarded a contract to Alexander Dennis for 10 double-deck buses in 2016; the contract includes options for an additional 19 buses, divided as 10 buses for AC Transit, 3 buses for Unitrans, and 6 buses for WestCAT. Transbay service using Enviro500s began in December 2018.

Spokane Transit started taking delivery of an order of 7 buses in 2025, to be used for regional routes from downtown Spokane to Eastern Washington University in Cheney, Washington.

RTC Transit took delivery of ten Enviro500 MMCs for use on 'The Deuce', serving the Las Vegas metropolitan area and running along the Las Vegas Strip, in August 2025.

==== Canada ====
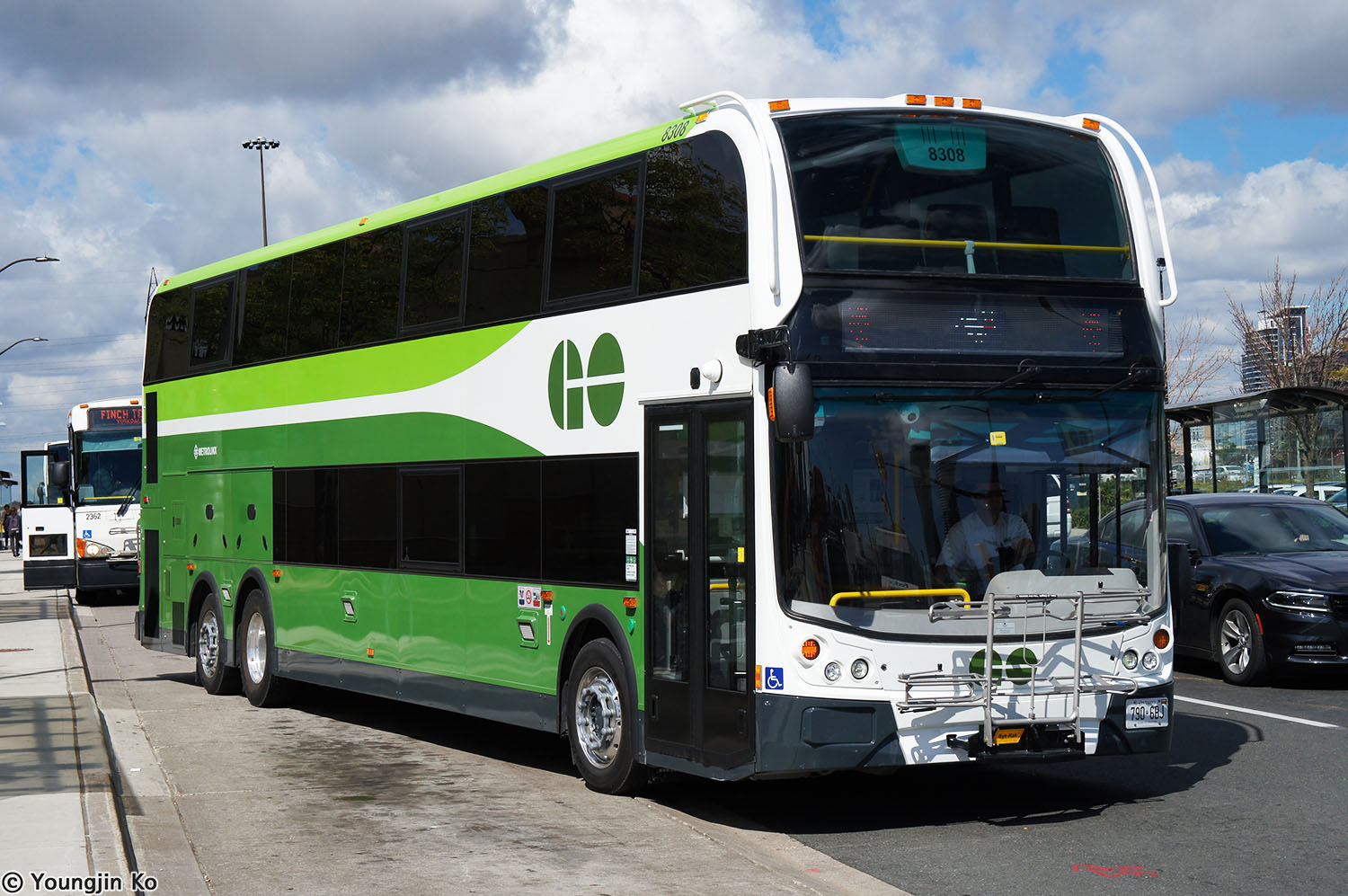
GO Transit's Enviro500 MMC "SuperLo" at Square One Bus Terminal.

In 2015, GO Transit, Canada's largest operator of double-deckers with over 120 vehicles in its fleet, became the launch customer for the Super-Lo variant of the Enviro500s. Their lower height of 3.9 metres allows them to fit into terminals with height restrictions, particularly York Mills and Yorkdale Terminals. The first batch of 38 vehicles (8300-8337) was delivered in 2016. The chassis for these vehicles are being manufactured at a purpose-built factory in Vaughan, north of Toronto, creating up to 30 new full-time jobs. As a suburban bus operator, the Enviro500 has single doors at the front.

Strathcona County Transit received five Enviro500 MMCs in 2016. An additional five were ordered in 2017/2018 and entered service in 2019. Two more entered service in early 2020.

OC Transpo ordered 43 new Enviro500 MMC "Go Anywhere" models for delivery starting in late 2015 with the last entering service September 2016. These new buses will also be fitted with Wi-Fi, of which 15 currently have Wi-Fi as a test project. A further 17 buses entered service in 2017, making the current active fleet of over 130 units, with plans for other units pending. OC Transpo's Enviro500 have doors at the front and the middle. 8155 was damaged in a serious collision with a Westboro transit station shelter.

Coast Mountain Bus Company (TransLink) ordered 32 units for 2019/2020 for use on their suburban routes, followed by another 25 buses for 2021. The first units entered service in October 2019.

==== Mexico ====
Metrobús of Mexico City ordered 90 Enviro500 MMCs after evaluating one original version Enviro500 demonstrator in late 2014. They are scheduled for delivery in 2016. The delivery has been delayed and as of 2017 only 22 out of 90 buses have arrived to Mexico City. The service of Metrobus is expected to start in October 2017 with the route that starts from Indios Verdes to Campo Marte.

=== Europe ===
==== Germany ====
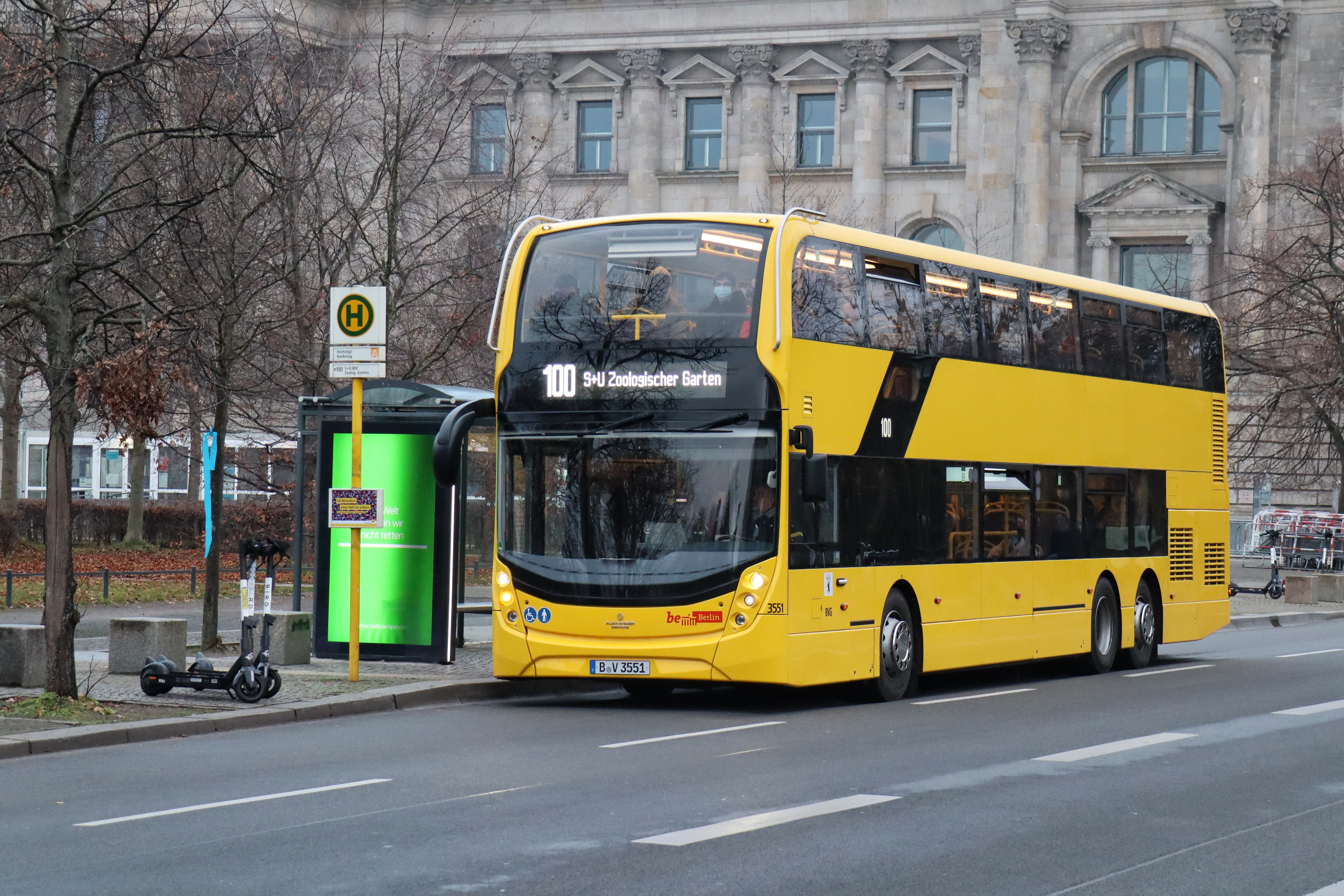
One of the first two Enviro500 MMCs for Berliner Verkehrsbetriebe

In October 2015 Berliner Verkehrsbetriebe (BVG), the public transport operator of Germany's capital, commenced a six-week trial of an Alexander Dennis Enviro500, as part of a bigger testing programme for a new series of buses for the city.

In October 2018, the BVG ordered 200 Enviro500s in order to replace the MAN Lion's City DD. The first two were unveiled by BVG in October 2020.

==== Switzerland ====
In September 2015, Alexander Dennis announced the order of 19 Enviro500 with twin staircases and three doors for PostAuto in Switzerland. Delivery started in 2017.

== See also ==
- List of buses
