= Woodlands Bus Interchange =

Bus interchange in Woodlands, Singapore

Woodlands Bus Interchange 兀兰巴士转换站 Pusat Pertukaran Bas Woodlands
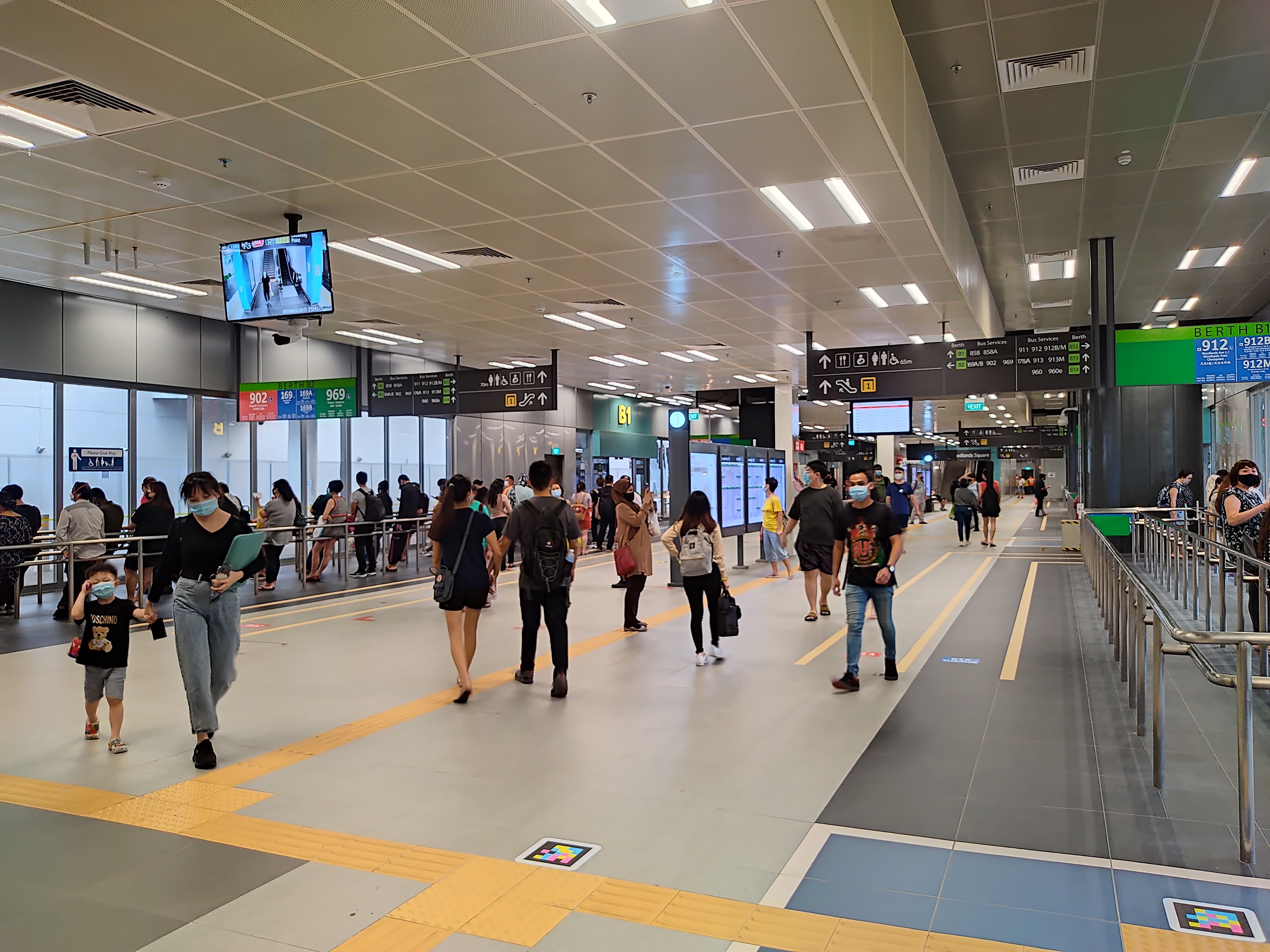
- Interior of Woodlands Integrated Transport Hub.

General information
- Location: Integrated Transport Hub: (Level B1) 30 Woodlands Avenue 2, Singapore 738343; Temporary: 3A Woodlands Square, Singapore 737735
- System: Public Bus Interchange
- Owner: Land Transport Authority
- Operator: SMRT Buses
- Bus routes: Integrated Transport Hub: 14 (SMRT Buses); 7 (Tower Transit Singapore); 2 (SBS Transit); Temporary: 4 (SMRT Buses); 1 (Tower Transit Singapore)
- Bus stands: Integrated Transport Hub: 14 Boarding Berths; 2 Alighting Berths; Temporary: 3 Sawtooth Boarding Berths; 2 Sawtooth Alighting Berths
- Bus operators: Integrated Transport Hub: SMRT Buses; Tower Transit Singapore; SBS Transit; Temporary: SMRT Buses; Tower Transit Singapore
- Connections: NS9 TE2 Woodlands

Construction
- Structure type: Underground (Integrated Transport Hub); At-grade (Temporary)
- Accessible: Accessible alighting/boarding points Accessible public toilets Graduated kerb edges Tactile guidance system

History
- Opened: 4 February 1996; 30 years ago (Old); 12 March 2016; 10 years ago (Temporary); 13 June 2021; 5 years ago (Integrated Transport Hub)
- Closed: 11 March 2016; 10 years ago (Old)

Key dates
- 4 February 1996: Commenced operations
- 12 March 2016: Operations transferred to Temporary bus interchange
- 13 June 2021: Most operations transferred to new and air-conditioned bus interchange as Integrated Transport Hub
Location

Woodlands Bus Interchange (formerly Woodlands Regional Bus Interchange) is an air-conditioned bus interchange located at Woodlands Town Centre, serving the Woodlands, Marsiling, and Admiralty regions. Nearby amenities include the Causeway Point Shopping Mall, Woods Square, Woodlands Civic Centre, and Woodlands Regional Library. It is the eleventh Integrated Transport Hub (ITH) which is the largest and among the busiest bus interchange in Singapore; referring to air-conditioned bus interchanges integrated with MRT stations and commercial developments.

Although the interchange first opened in 1996 as Woodlands Regional Bus Interchange, it was closed between 2016-2021 for extensive upgrading works, during which it was replaced by Woodlands Temporary Bus Interchange. Rail connections are offered via Woodlands MRT station along the North South Line (NSL) and Thomson-East Coast Line (TEL). It opened on 13 June 2021. All bus services at Woodlands Temporary Bus Interchange shifted over to the new interchange which is also known as Woodlands Integrated Transport Hub, except Bus Services 925, 950, 961 and 965 and their respective route variants, which remained at the old interchange.

== History ==
=== Original interchange (1996-2016) ===
In 1991, as part of efforts to improve connectivity in the area, the Singapore government announced plans to build a new bus interchange in Woodlands. Built by the Mass Rapid Transit Corporation (known today as SMRT Corporation) at a cost of S$34 million, the interchange was built under Woodlands MRT station, to facilitate connections between the station and the bus interchange, and leave more land available for other uses.

The bus interchange commenced operations in February 1996, replacing the previous Woodlands interchange near Woodlands Checkpoint, and the Marsiling bus terminal. Covering an area the size of three and a half football pitches and with 11 bus bays, Woodlands interchange featured an integrated taxi stand, and a bus parking area located away from the passenger concourse.

=== Temporary and upgraded interchange (from 2016) ===
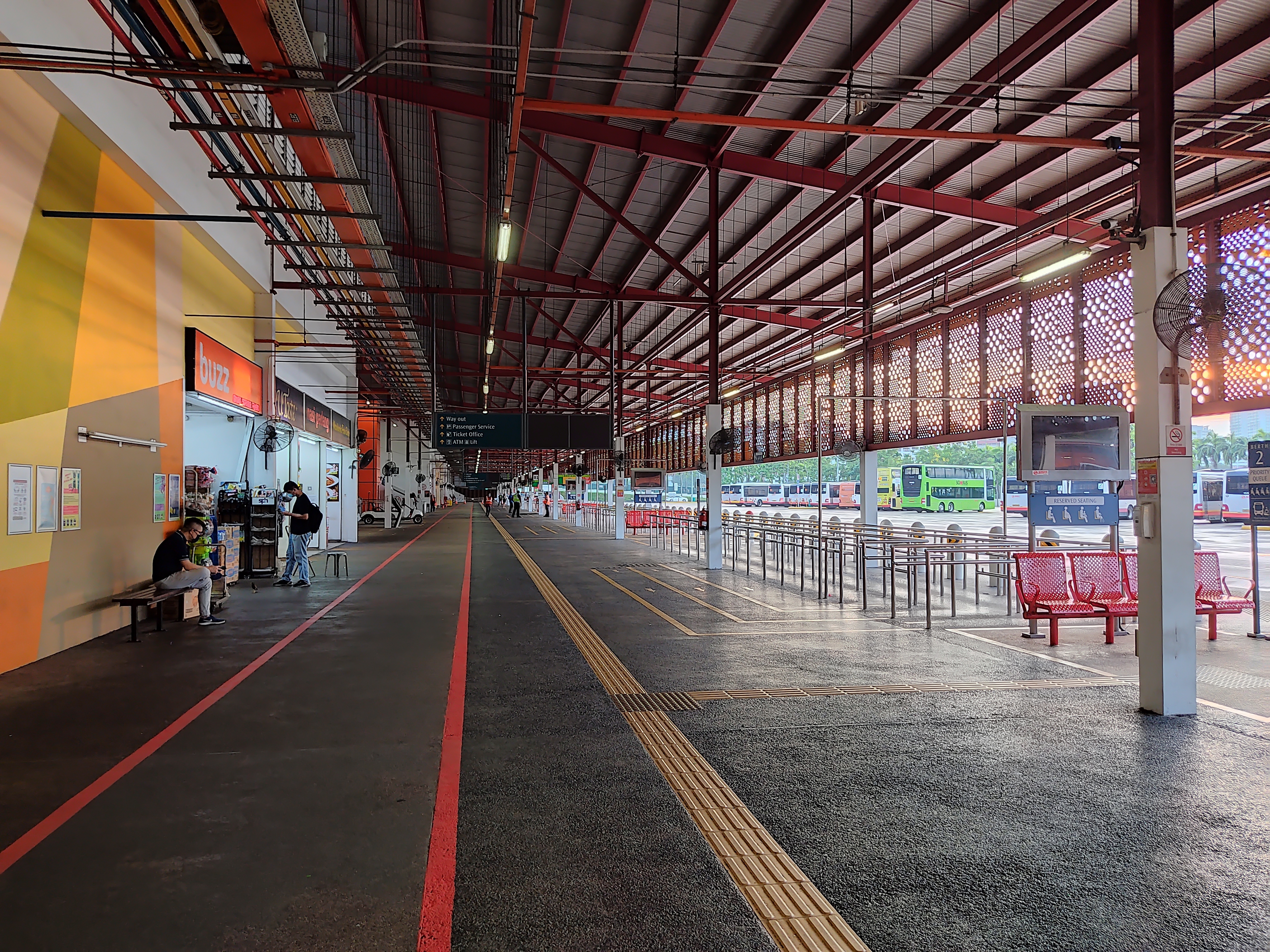
The Woodlands Temporary Bus Interchange in June 2021

Contract PT247 to carry out alteration works to upgrade the Woodlands Regional Bus Interchange to an air-conditioned one and constructing a link to the new Thomson–East Coast line (TEL) was awarded to CCECC Singapore Pte Ltd.

On 4 February 2016, the Land Transport Authority (LTA) announced that the interchange would be relocated to a temporary interchange beside Woodlands MRT station from 12 March to facilitate upgrading of the interchange and construction of a new link to the TEL station, with operations of all bus services serving the interchange shifted. The upgrading works would feature enhanced facilities for both commuters and bus captains, and were initially planned to be completed by 2019.

The upgraded bus interchange reopened on 13 June 2021, with many commuters saying that the new interchange brings greater comfort from better shelter from the rain or heat, air-conditioning, and lighting, allowing the interchange to feel more modern. To ease possible congestion in the interchange, four bus services remained at the temporary interchange.

On 24 November, the Prime Minister's Office announced that the temporary bus interchange would be used for a land vaccinated travel lane (VTL-Land) bus service operated by Transtar between Woodlands and Larkin Sentral, with 16 trips per direction, from 29 November. This service allowed many families to reunite with those who were stuck at the land border due to the COVID-19 pandemic.

On 12 December, roadworks on the east entrance of the ITH caused 15 bus services to be diverted to either the temporary bus interchange or to the west entrance of the ITH, resulting in longer journey times, and brought back the inconveniences getting to the temporary interchange had. Normal services reinstated on 26 December, with many commuters and businesses at the MRT station glad that the road works were over.

On 1 April 2022, the VTL service was renamed to Vaccinated Travel Bus Service (VTBS) when the borders were reopened to all vaccinated persons. The VTBS ceased operations on 1 May 2022 as cross-border public bus services resumed.

== Bus contracting model ==
Under the bus contracting model, all bus services operating from Woodlands Bus Interchange are divided into four Bus Packages operated by three bus operators. Services from Woodlands Temporary Bus Interchange are divided into two Bus Packages operated by two bus operators.

=== List of bus services ===
Woodlands Bus Interchange
Operator	Package	Service	Berth	Destination
SBS Transit	Bedok	168	B10	Bedok
SBS Transit	Bedok	168A	B10	Tampines Avenue 4 (Opp Tampines Station/Tampines Interchange)
SBS Transit	Sengkang–Hougang	161	B10	Hougang Central
SMRT Buses	Woodlands	178	B13	Boon Lay
SMRT Buses	Woodlands	178A	B13	Woodlands Road (Kranji Station)
SMRT Buses	Woodlands	187	B9	Boon Lay
SMRT Buses	Woodlands	900	B4	↺ Woodlands Avenue 1
SMRT Buses	Woodlands	901	B5	↺ Woodlands Avenue 6
SMRT Buses	Woodlands	901M	B5	↺ Woodlands Avenue 7
SMRT Buses	Woodlands	902	B2	Woodlands Avenue 9 (Republic Poly)
SMRT Buses	Woodlands	903	B4	↺ Woodlands Centre Road
SMRT Buses	Woodlands	903M	B4	↺ Marsiling Lane
SMRT Buses	Woodlands	904	B5	↺ Woodlands Crescent
SMRT Buses	Woodlands	911/911T	B6	↺ Woodlands Avenue 2
SMRT Buses	Woodlands	911/911T	B12	↺ Woodlands Centre Road
SMRT Buses	Woodlands	911A	B12	Woodlands Street 13 (Blk 146)
SMRT Buses	Woodlands	912/912A	B7	↺ Woodlands Avenue 7
SMRT Buses	Woodlands	912/912B	B12	↺ Woodlands Centre Road
SMRT Buses	Woodlands	913/913T	B3	↺ Woodlands Circle
SMRT Buses	Woodlands	913/913T	B13	↺ Woodlands Avenue 3
SMRT Buses	Woodlands	913M	B13	↺ Woodlands Street 13
SMRT Buses	Woodlands	960	B14	Marina Centre
SMRT Buses	Woodlands	960e	B14	Marina Centre
SMRT Buses	Woodlands	962	B6	↺ Admiralty Street
SMRT Buses	Woodlands	964	B3	↺ Woodlands Link
Tower Transit Singapore	Sembawang–Yishun	169	B2	Ang Mo Kio
Tower Transit Singapore	Sembawang–Yishun	169A	B2	Yishun Avenue 2 (Opp Yishun Station)
Tower Transit Singapore	Sembawang–Yishun	169B	B2	Woodlands Avenue 8 (Bef W’lands Ind Pk E3)
Tower Transit Singapore	Sembawang–Yishun	856	B11	Yishun
Tower Transit Singapore	Sembawang–Yishun	856A	B11	Woodlands Centre Road (Woodlands Train Checkpoint)
Tower Transit Singapore	Sembawang–Yishun	856B	B11	Canberra Road (Aft Admiral Hill)
Tower Transit Singapore	Sembawang–Yishun	858	B1	↺ Changi Airport
Tower Transit Singapore	Sembawang–Yishun	858A	B1	Yishun Avenue 2 (Opp Yishun Station)
Tower Transit Singapore	Sembawang–Yishun	963	B9	HarbourFront
Tower Transit Singapore	Sembawang–Yishun	963e	B9	HarbourFront
Tower Transit Singapore	Sembawang–Yishun	966	B11	↺ Marine Parade Road
Tower Transit Singapore	Sembawang–Yishun	966A	B11	Marine Parade Road (Marine Parade Station Exit 2)
Tower Transit Singapore	Sembawang–Yishun	969	B2	Tampines

Woodlands Temporary Bus Interchange
Operator	Package	Service	Berth	Destination
SMRT Buses	Woodlands	925	B1	Choa Chu Kang
SMRT Buses	Woodlands	925A	B1	Kranji Way (Kranji Resvr Pk B)
SMRT Buses	Woodlands	925M	B1	↺ Neo Tiew Crescent
SMRT Buses	Woodlands	950	B2	↺ JB Sentral
SMRT Buses	Woodlands	961	B1	Lorong 1 Geylang
SMRT Buses	Woodlands	961M	B1	Lorong 1 Geylang
SMRT Buses	Woodlands	967	B3	↺ Woodlands Drive 17
Tower Transit Singapore	Sembawang–Yishun	965	B3	Buangkok
Tower Transit Singapore	Sembawang–Yishun	965A	B3	Yishun Avenue 2 (Opp Yishun Station)
