= SMRT Buses =

Public bus operator in Singapore

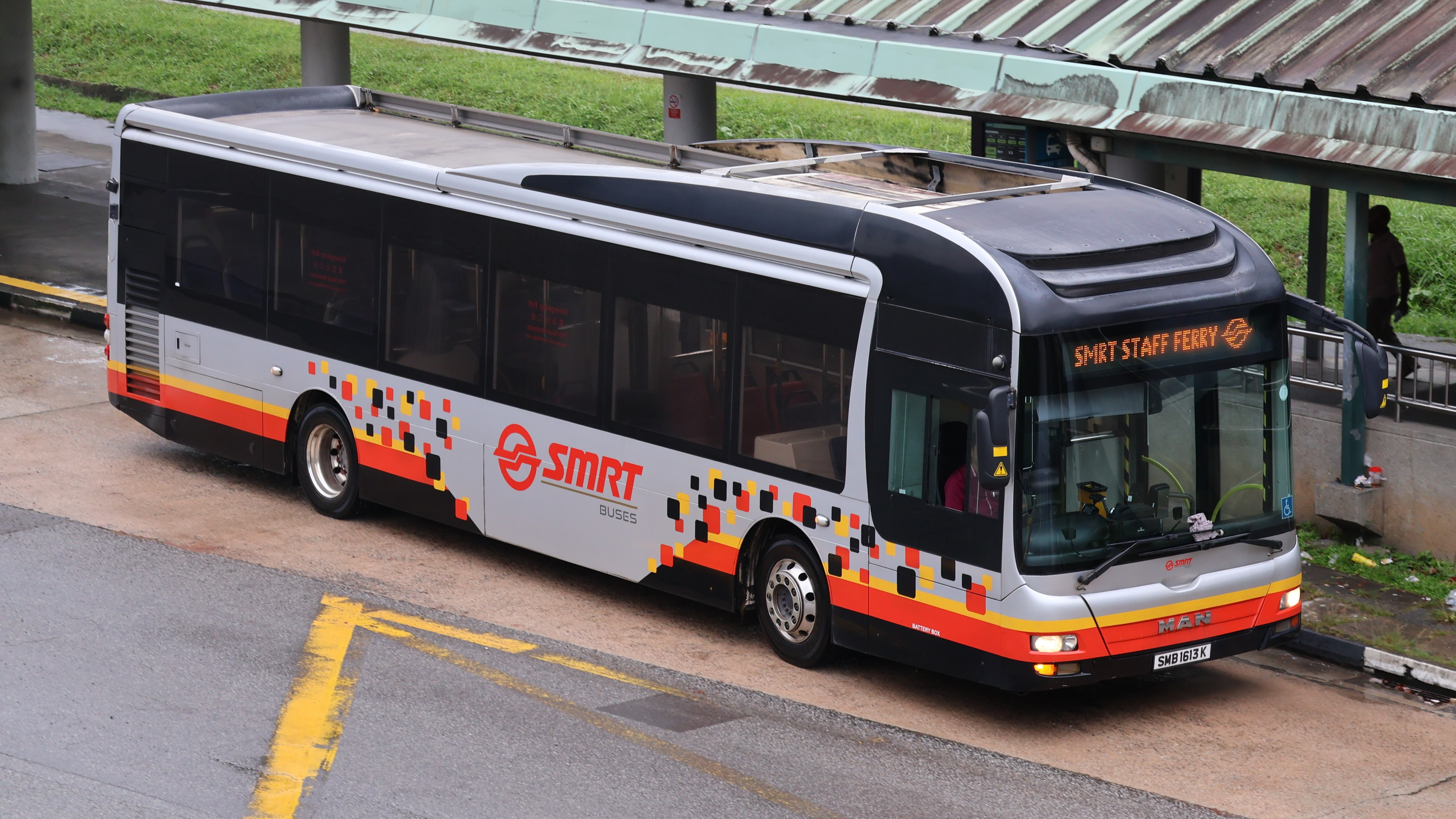
- An SMRT Buses MAN NL323F in January 2025
- Parent: SMRT Corporation
- Founded: 3 April 1983; 43 years ago (as Trans-Island Bus Services); 10 May 2004; 22 years ago (as SMRT Buses)
- Headquarters: Woodlands Bus Depot; 60 Woodlands Industrial Park E4 Singapore 757705
- Service area: Northern and Western Singapore
- Service type: Bus operator
- Routes: 78; 104 (From June 2027)
- Hubs: 8 Boon Lay; Bukit Panjang; Choa Chu Kang; Eunos (From June 2027); Gali Batu; Joo Koon; Serangoon (From June 2027); Sims Place (From June 2027); Tuas; Woodlands (Integrated Transport Hub + Temporary Bus Interchange); Woodleigh (From June 2027)
- Stations: 13; Ang Mo Kio (From June 2027); Bedok (From June 2027); Bishan (From June 2027); Buangkok; Bukit Batok; Bukit Merah; Buona Vista; Changi Airport; Changi Village (From June 2027); Eunos (Until June 2027); HarbourFront; JB Sentral; Jurong East (From June 2027); Kampong Bahru; Lorong 1 Geylang; Marina Centre; Pasir Ris (From June 2027); Shenton Way; Tampines; Toa Payoh (From June 2027); Upper East Coast (From June 2027); Yishun (From June 2027)
- Depots: 3 Gali Batu; Soon Lee; Woodlands; Kim Chuan (From June 2027)
- Website: www.smrt.com.sg

SMRT Buses is the second largest bus operator in Singapore. A subsidiary of SMRT Corporation, it traded as Trans Island Bus Services until 10 May 2004.

== History ==
=== Trans-Island Bus Services (1983–2004) ===
In April 1981, Communications & Labour Minister Ong Teng Cheong announced the government would grant a license to an operator that was willing to compete with Singapore Bus Service (SBS), that had operated all services in Singapore since 1973, with the aim of improving service levels. In January 1982, City Shuttle Service operator Singapore Shuttle Bus (SSB) lodged applications with the Ministry of Communications to establish a second bus operator and the Registry Of Vehicles for four bus depots. The applications were approved on 12 March that year, with SSB to take over 11 services in Woodlands and Sembawang from SBS.

A new company, Trans-Island Bus Services, was founded on 31 May 1982, ordering a fleet of 250 buses including 90 Hinos. Operations commenced on 3 April 1983 with 40 buses.

On 12 March 1987, TIBS purchased its former parent company SSB. On 27 April, TIBS was listed on SESDAQ, although Ng Ser Miang retained a majority shareholding. By this stage it operated 361 buses.

As part of the government's plan to make the local bus system more competitive and to cushion TIBS from the impact of its bus services being axed or truncated due to the Woodlands MRT Line, 16 SBS services in Bukit Panjang and Jalan Kayu were handed over to TIBS in 1995. TIBS was also allocated to operate bus services in the then upcoming new towns of Sembawang, Simpang, Sengkang and Punggol.

In 1996, TIBS began operations at the Woodlands Regional Bus Interchange, Singapore's first underground bus interchange. It was also the first bus interchange designed to accommodate articulated buses. some of which were designed by world-renowned designer, Pininfarina and was known as the Habit articulated buses, on a large scale in its fleet, in contrast to the double-deckers used by SBS.

In 1999, SBS Transit was awarded both bus and train services in the entire north-east corridor with the North East line, Sengkang LRT and Punggol LRT by the Land Transport Authority, both based in Sengkang. Eight bus routes affected in the bus tender of Sengkang and Punggol were transferred to SBS Transit. In return, TIBS was awarded to operate 17 routes in the north-west corridor towns of Choa Chu Kang and Bukit Batok, where the handover was done in stages together with the opening of Bukit Panjang LRT. Buses 61, 106 and 173 were the last services to be handed over mainly due to extra time involved.

In February 2001, TIBS joined with RATP Group in an unsuccessful bid to operate the Marina MRT line (now known as Circle line).

=== SMRT Buses (2004–present) ===
In 1999, TIBS and SMRT engaged in merger talks which failed. In July 2001, SMRT launched a takeover bid for TIBS that was accepted. The transaction was completed in December 2001, with TIBS being operated as a wholly owned subsidiary. As part of a corporate rebranding programme, TIBS was rebranded as SMRT Buses in May 2004.

In 2008, SMRT's first new bus after rebranding, the Mercedes-Benz OC500LE, entered service. It is its first wheelchair-accessible bus and first in Southeast Asia to meet Euro V emission standard.

On 26 November 2012, 170 bus drivers (all of whom were foreign nationals from China), refused to leave their living quarters for work. This reduced bus services to 90% of normal levels. The Ministry of Manpower considered it an illegal strike since the group failed to give a 14 days notice prior to disrupting an essential public service, as is required by the local laws. As a result, five of the strikers were jailed for instigating the strike, and another 29 were deported.

On 26 December 2012, SMRT relocated Bukit Panjang Interchange to Bukit Panjang Temporary Bus Park.

In 2014, SMRT bought its first double-decker buses, the Alexander Dennis Enviro500 MMC was made revenue service debut on bus 972. Fleet restrictions were gradually eased at -

- Hillview Road (2014, Service 176 & 963)
- Henderson Road (November 2014, Service 176)
- Bukit Timah Road (February 2015, Service 67 & 960)
- Yishun Bus Interchange (March 2015)
- Ang Mo Kio Bus Depot (October 2015, Service 854)

On 13 March 2016, SMRT relocated Woodlands Regional Interchange to Woodlands Temporary Interchange. On 29 May, SMRT handed over management of Bukit Batok Interchange and Bukit Batok services under Bulim package to Tower Transit Singapore.

On 4 September 2017, SMRT opened its first integrated transport hub, Bukit Panjang.

On 18 and 25 March 2018, SMRT handed over Yishun services under Seletar package to SBS Transit. On 16 December, SMRT relocated Choa Chu Kang Interchange.

On 8 September 2019, SMRT opened its second integrated transport hub, Yishun.

In November 2020, SMRT laid up its last non-wheelchair accessible bus, the Mercedes-Benz O405G Hispano Habit. 1 unit is currently preserved at Woodlands depot.

On 23 January 2021, SMRT relocated Bukit Panjang Temporary Bus Park to Gali Batu Terminal. On 13 June, SMRT opened its third and also largest integrated transport hub in Singapore, Woodlands. From 5 September to 3 October, SMRT handed over management of Yishun Integrated Transport Hub & Sembawang Interchange and Yishun, Woodlands & Sembawang / Yio Chu Kang services under Sembawang-Yishun package to Tower Transit Singapore in 3 separate tranches. As a result; SMRT discontinued NightRider NR1, NR2 and Express 963R at the expiry of Mandai Package contract on 3 October 2021 and in February 2022, SMRT closed its Ang Mo Kio depot.

SMRT discontinued three more NightRider (NR3, NR5, NR6 and NR8), Resorts World (188R) and Zoo (926) on 30 June 2022. These services were suspended since 8 April 2020 due to the COVID-19 pandemic in Singapore.

On 18 August 2023, the Land Transport Authority announced that SMRT had won the bid for the Jurong West Bus Package.

On 1 and 15 September 2024, SMRT took over management of Soon Lee Depot, Boon Lay and Joo Koon Integrated Transport Hub and Tuas Terminal and Boon Lay, Joo Koon / Tuas / Soon Lee services under Jurong West package from SBS Transit.

On 12 and 13 January 2025, Bus 912M was withdrawn and Bus 967 from Woodlands Temp Interchange was introduced.

=== Route handovers ===
Year	Bus Package	From	To	Reason
1983	Sembawang/Yishun/Woodlands	Singapore Bus Services	Trans-Island Bus Services	
1995	Bukit Panjang	Singapore Bus Services	Trans-Island Bus Services	Foster greater competition in the bus industry and to cushion the impact with the rationalisation of bus services caused by the opening of Woodlands MRT extension in 1996.
1995	Sengkang/Punggol	Singapore Bus Services	Trans-Island Bus Services	Foster greater competition in the bus industry and to cushion the impact with the rationalisation of bus services caused by the opening of Woodlands MRT extension in 1996.
1999	Choa Chu Kang	Singapore Bus Services	Trans-Island Bus Services	The tender to operate the North East Line, Sengkang and Punggol LRT, and several bus services in the Sengkang and Punggol are awarded to SBS. In addition, bus tenders for Choa Chu Kang and Bukit Batok bus services are awarded to TIBS. This move is also to cushion the impact with the rationalisation of bus services caused by Bukit Panjang LRT in 1999, as well as to reduce congestion in depots (Bus 61, 67, 106 and 172).
1999	Sengkang/Punggol	Trans-Island Bus Services	Singapore Bus Services	The tender to operate the North East Line, Sengkang and Punggol LRT, and several bus services in the Sengkang and Punggol are awarded to SBS. In addition, bus tenders for Choa Chu Kang and Bukit Batok bus services are awarded to TIBS. This move is also to cushion the impact with the rationalisation of bus services caused by Bukit Panjang LRT in 1999, as well as to reduce congestion in depots (Bus 61, 67, 106 and 172).
2000	Bukit Batok	Singapore Bus Services	Trans-Island Bus Services	The tender to operate the North East Line, Sengkang and Punggol LRT, and several bus services in the Sengkang and Punggol are awarded to SBS. In addition, bus tenders for Choa Chu Kang and Bukit Batok bus services are awarded to TIBS. This move is also to cushion the impact with the rationalisation of bus services caused by Bukit Panjang LRT in 1999, as well as to reduce congestion in depots (Bus 61, 67, 106 and 172).
2016	Bulim (Bukit Batok)	SMRT Buses	Tower Transit Singapore	Under the Bus Contracting Model from 2016 onwards.
2018	Seletar	SMRT Buses	SBS Transit	Under the Bus Contracting Model from 2016 onwards.
2021	Sembawang-Yishun	SMRT Buses	Tower Transit Singapore	Under the Bus Contracting Model from 2016 onwards.
2024	Jurong West	SBS Transit	SMRT Buses	Under the Bus Contracting Model from 2016 onwards.
2027	Serangoon-Eunos	SBS Transit	SMRT Buses	Under the Bus Contracting Model from 2016 onwards.

== Routes ==
SMRT Buses primarily operates services originating from Woodlands, Bukit Panjang, Choa Chu Kang, Bukit Batok, Jurong West, Joo Koon and Tuas, and from July 2027, Serangoon, Eunos, Woodleigh, Sims Place and Lorong 1 Geylang.

In September 2024, SMRT took over the Jurong West Bus Package from SBS Transit to operate their routes spanning from Joo Koon and Boon Lay Bus Interchanges, as well as Tuas Bus Terminal respectively.

In addition, SMRT Corporation has a minibus subsidiary Bus-Plus Services (now trading as Strides) which provides some premium, free shuttle, chartered, and peak-hour peak period bus services throughout Singapore.

== Fleet ==
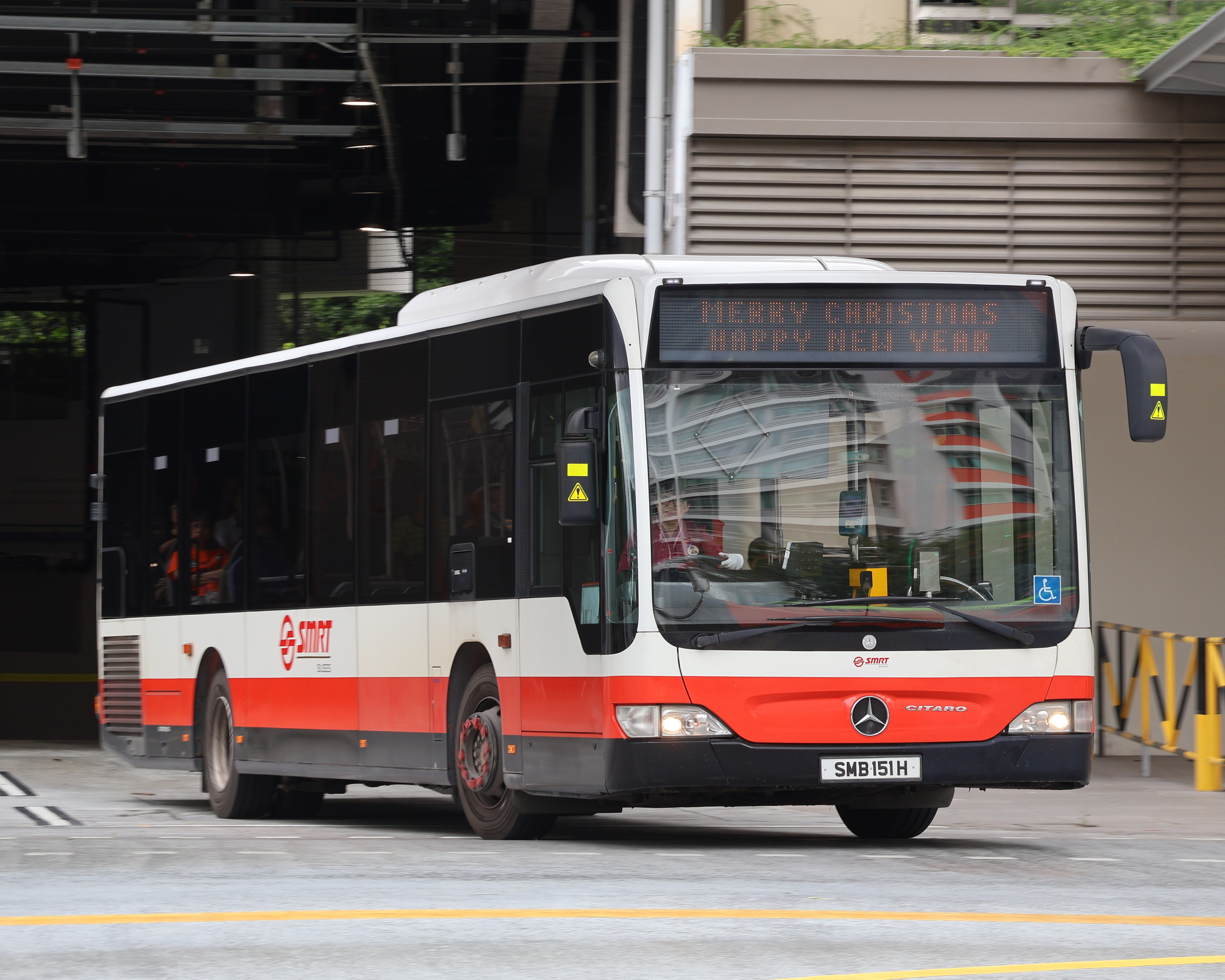
A Mercedes-Benz Citaro operated by SMRT

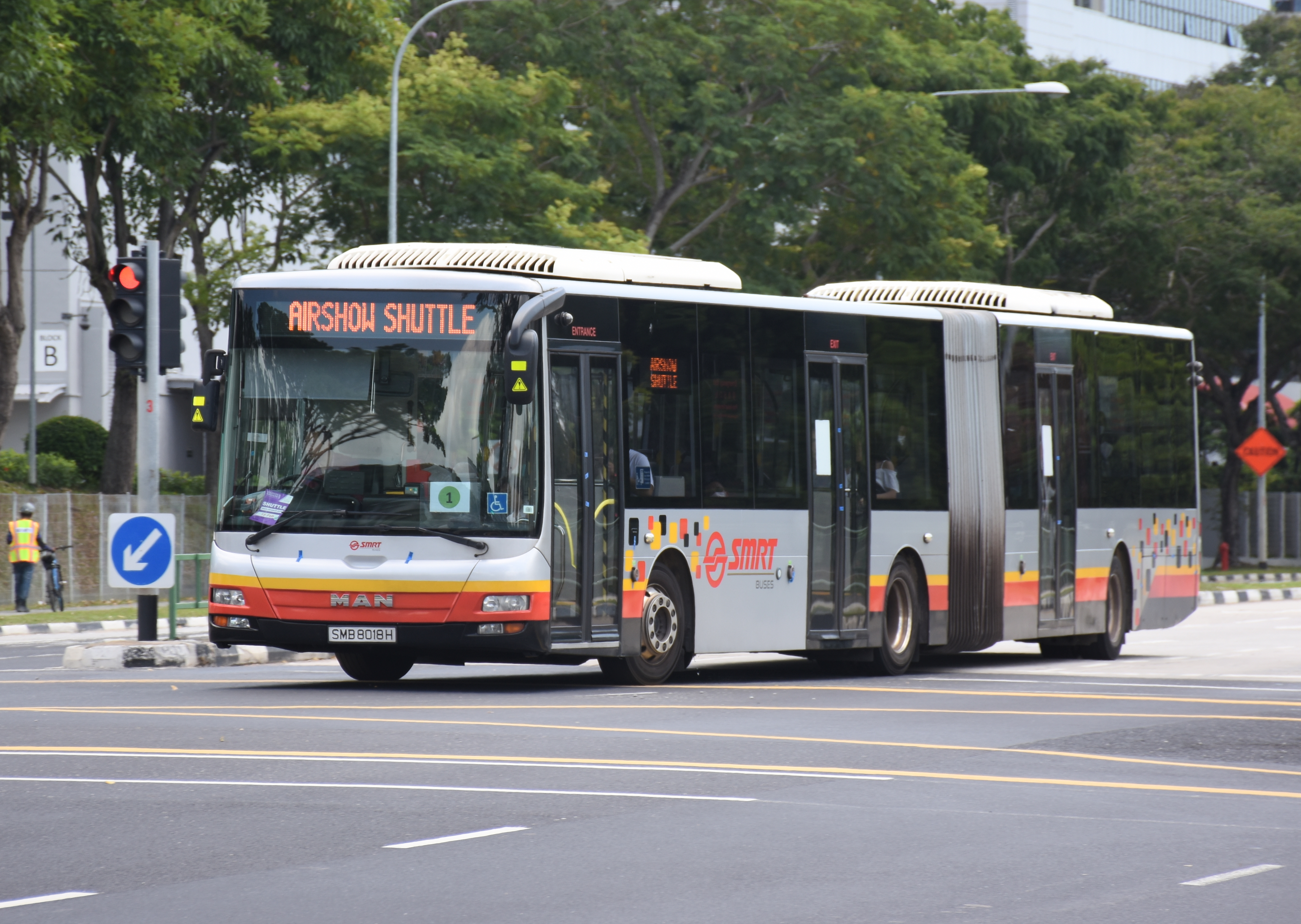
The MAN A24 Articulated Bus is the only model of Articulated Bus model left in the SMRT fleet. It is also the last batch of articulated buses in Singapore.

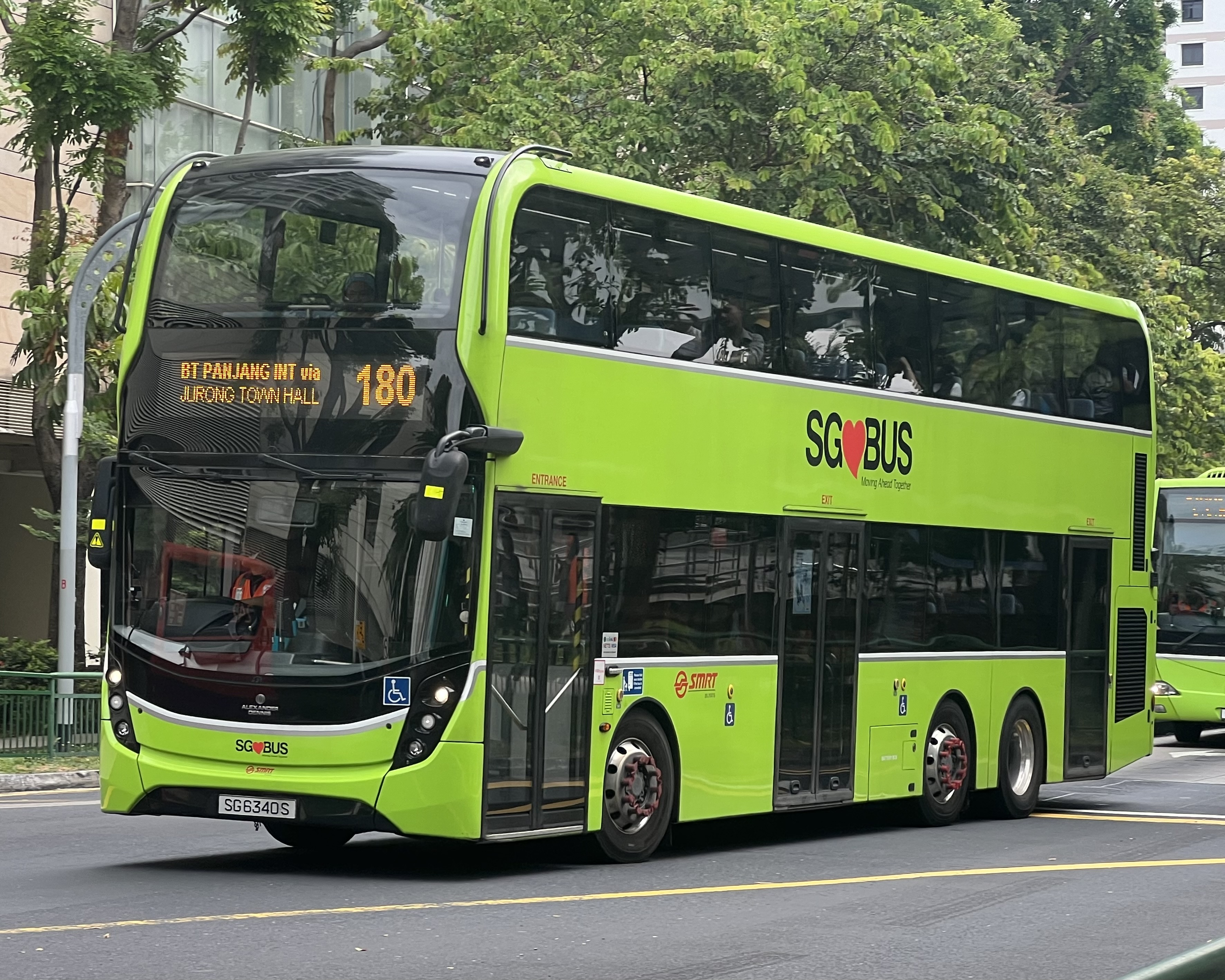
An Alexander Dennis Enviro500 (3 Door) of SMRT Buses on service 180

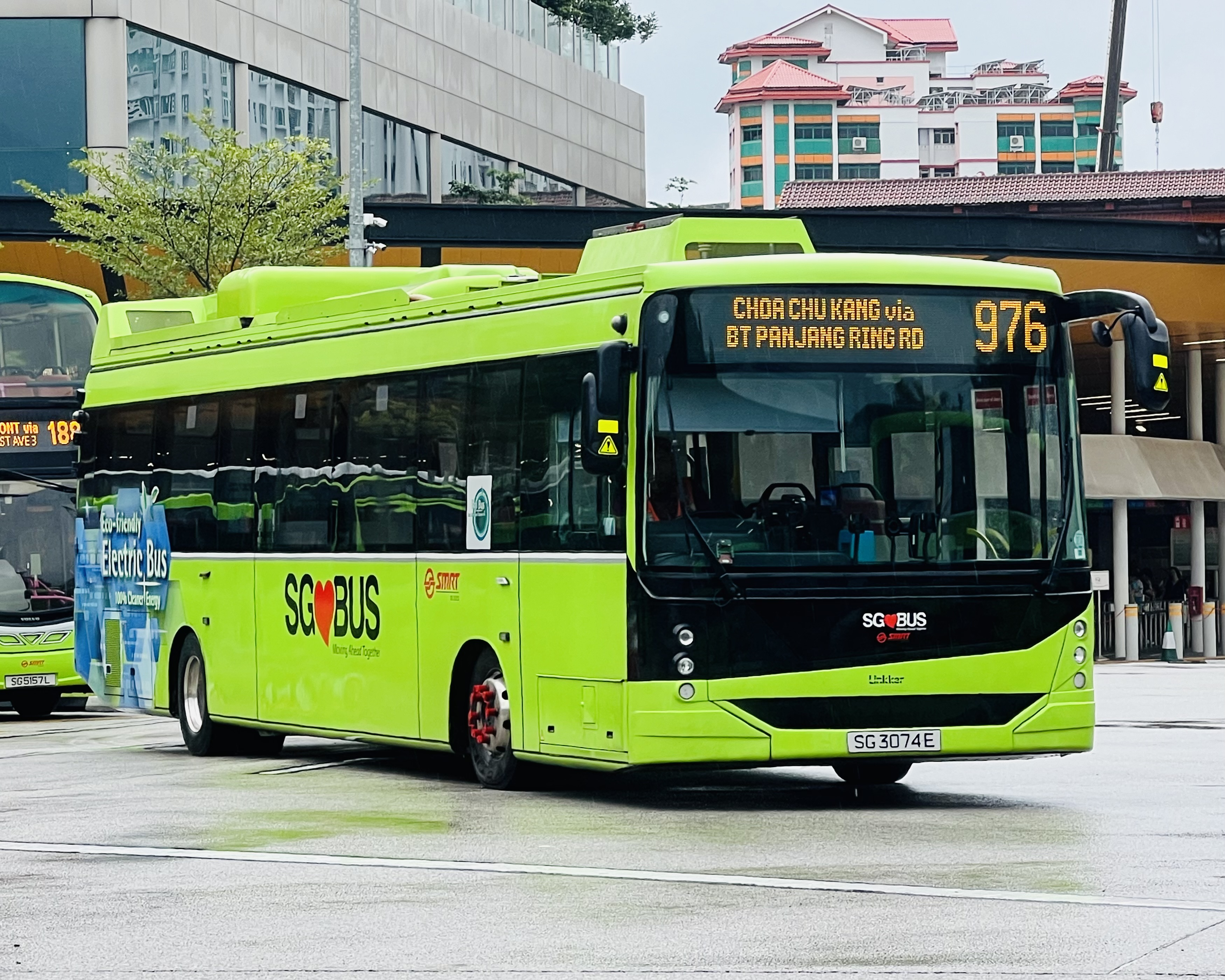
A SMRT Linkker LM312 on service 976

As of 2024, SMRT Buses operates more than 1,450 buses.

It was the only operator of articulated buses in Singapore until 2018, when the Seletar Package transitioned to a Tendered Contract (TC). SMRT Buses also introduced their first double-decker buses in 2014. It was the first operator to introduce electronic destination signage (EDS) on its buses since 1990, which is now standard equipment on all new buses introduced to Singapore. Some of these recently acquired buses are used for Bus Service Enhancement Programme (BSEP) since 2012.

SMRT Buses also had inherited buses from SBS Transit due to the Bus Contracting Model. These buses are Volvo B9TL (Wright Eclipse Gemini 2), Scania K230UB, and Mercedes-Benz O530 Citaro, all originally built to SBS Transit technical and interior specifications.

=== Historical ===
In the 1980s, TIBS operated buses that were mostly of Japanese build such as Hino (such as the initial RK176 and the later HT238K) and Nissan Diesel (mostly the U31 series)

=== Current fleet ===
==== Single deck ====
- MAN NL323F Lion's City (A22) (Gemilang Coachworks)
- Mercedes-Benz O530 Citaro (Daimler Buses)
- Mercedes-Benz OC500LE (Gemilang-Thonburi)
- Volvo B5L Hybrid (MCV Evora)
- Yutong ZK6128BEVG E12
- Linkker LM312 (Gemilang Coachworks)
- BYD GTK6127BEVB (BC12A04) (Zhuhai Guangtong)
- Zhongtong LCK6126EVG N12 (Integral)

==== Double decker ====
- Alexander Dennis Enviro500 MMC
- MAN ND323F Lion's City (A95) (Gemilang Coachworks)
- Volvo B9TL (Wright Eclipse Gemini 2)
- Yutong ZK6125BEVGS E12DD

==== Articulated ====
- MAN NG363F Lion's City (A24) (Gemilang Coachworks)

=== Former vehicle fleet ===
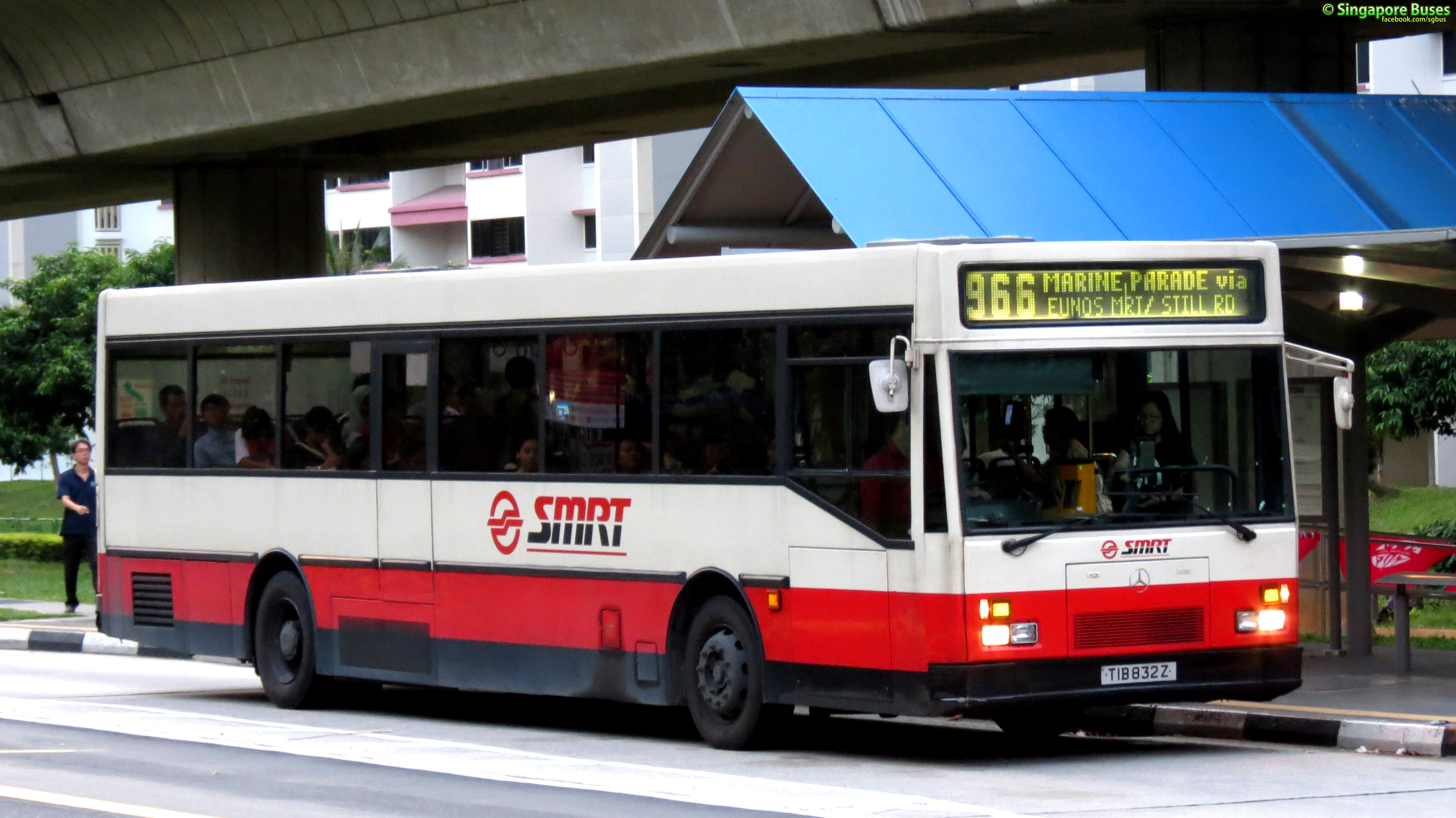
The Mercedes-Benz O405/0405G was a common fleet in SMRT between the 1990s and 2000s

- Mercedes-Benz O405/O405G
- Dennis Lance(Duple Metsec)
- DAF SB220 referred to as the Single-deck Vehicle, 220 hp (SV220)
- Scania L113CRL
- Hino HS3KRK
- Yutong ZK6126HGC (integral) demonstrator
- Zhongtong LCK6121GHEV Hybrid (integral) demonstrator
- Scania K230UB (Gemilang Coachworks)
- BYD C6 (All units transferred to Tower Transit Singapore)

== Depots ==
SMRT Buses currently operates three bus depots.

=== Gali Batu (GB) ===
Located in the north west region of Singapore, Gali Batu Bus Depot is the new bus depot built to replace Kranji Bus Depot. It currently serves routes in the Choa Chu Kang-Bukit Panjang package.

=== Woodlands (WL) ===
Located in the north region of Singapore, Woodlands Bus Depot is the third bus depot to be built under Trans-Island Bus Services and Singapore's first multi-storey bus depot. Opened in 1999, It consists of two floors, workshop on first floor and parking on both floors. Another building housed the Operations Control Centre. Throughout the years, it served Boon Lay, Bukit Panjang, Choa Chu Kang, Woodlands, Sembawang and Yishun. It currently serves routes under Woodlands package. To cope with insufficient parking, additional parking was built on a separate site nearby known as Woodlands Bus Park in 2013. It was assigned as the new Headquarters for the company after the closure of Ang Mo Kio Depot in 2022.

=== Soon Lee (SL) ===
Located in the west region of Singapore, Soon Lee Bus Depot was the first multi-storey bus depot built under SBS Transit and Singapore's second multi-storey bus depot. Opened in 2002, it replaced the former Jurong Depot.

It consists of four floors, workshop, refuelling and washing on the first floor and parking on all floors. It also housed the Operations Control Centre for SBS Transit West District. Throughout the years, it served Boon Lay, Jurong East, Joo Koon and Tuas. It currently serves routes under Jurong West package. In September 2024, SBS Transit handed over the depot to SMRT Buses for Jurong West package. SBS Transit stayed on as a tenant due to insufficient parking at Bukit Batok and Ulu Pandan Depots. In December 2024, SBS Transit left Soon Lee and took over SMRT Buses's tenancy at Bulim depot.

=== Former tenant depots ===
To cope with insufficient parking, SMRT Buses formerly occupied the following depots as a tenant:

==== Bulim (BU) ====
From 2014 to 2024, supporting Kranji

==== Loyang (LY) ====
From 2016 to 2018, supporting Ang Mo Kio

==== Seletar (SE) ====
From 2018 to 2024, supporting Ang Mo Kio (2018–2021), Woodlands (2021–2024)

==== Ulu Pandan (UP) ====
From 2018 to 2021, supporting Kranji

=== Former Depots ===
==== Ang Mo Kio (AM) ====
Located in the north-east region of Singapore, Ang Mo Kio Bus Depot was the first bus depot to be built under Trans-Island Bus Services and the headquarters for the company. Operations started in 1982 at a temporary site. The permanent depot was completed in 1985. Throughout the years, it served the routes in central and east of Singapore.

In its final years, it served routes under Sembawang-Yishun package, before finally shutting down in 2022, soon after Tower Transit had taken over the package and its services, with Woodlands Depot replacing it as the SMRT Buses' new headquarters.

==== Kranji (KJ) ====
Located in the north-west region of Singapore, Kranji Bus Depot is the second bus depot to be built under Trans-Island Bus Services. Operations started in 1982 at a temporary site. The permanent depot was completed in 1989. Throughout the years, it served Admiralty, Boon Lay, Bukit Batok, Bukit Panjang, Choa Chu Kang, Gali Batu, Marsiling, Sembawang and Woodlands. It formerly served routes under the Choa Chu Kang-Bukit Panjang package. It was replaced by Gali Batu Bus Depot.
