= List of bus stations in Singapore =

List of bus interchanges, terminals, and depots in Singapore

This is a list of bus interchanges, terminals and depots that are part of Singapore's bus system (not including bus stops). Bus terminals and interchanges serve as important nodes in the transport system as bus services start and end at these stations. Over time, there are several bus stations that have been shut down due to geographical retention, introduction of new town centres, or creation of consolidated transportation hubs. The list of former bus stations are found here.

== Overview ==
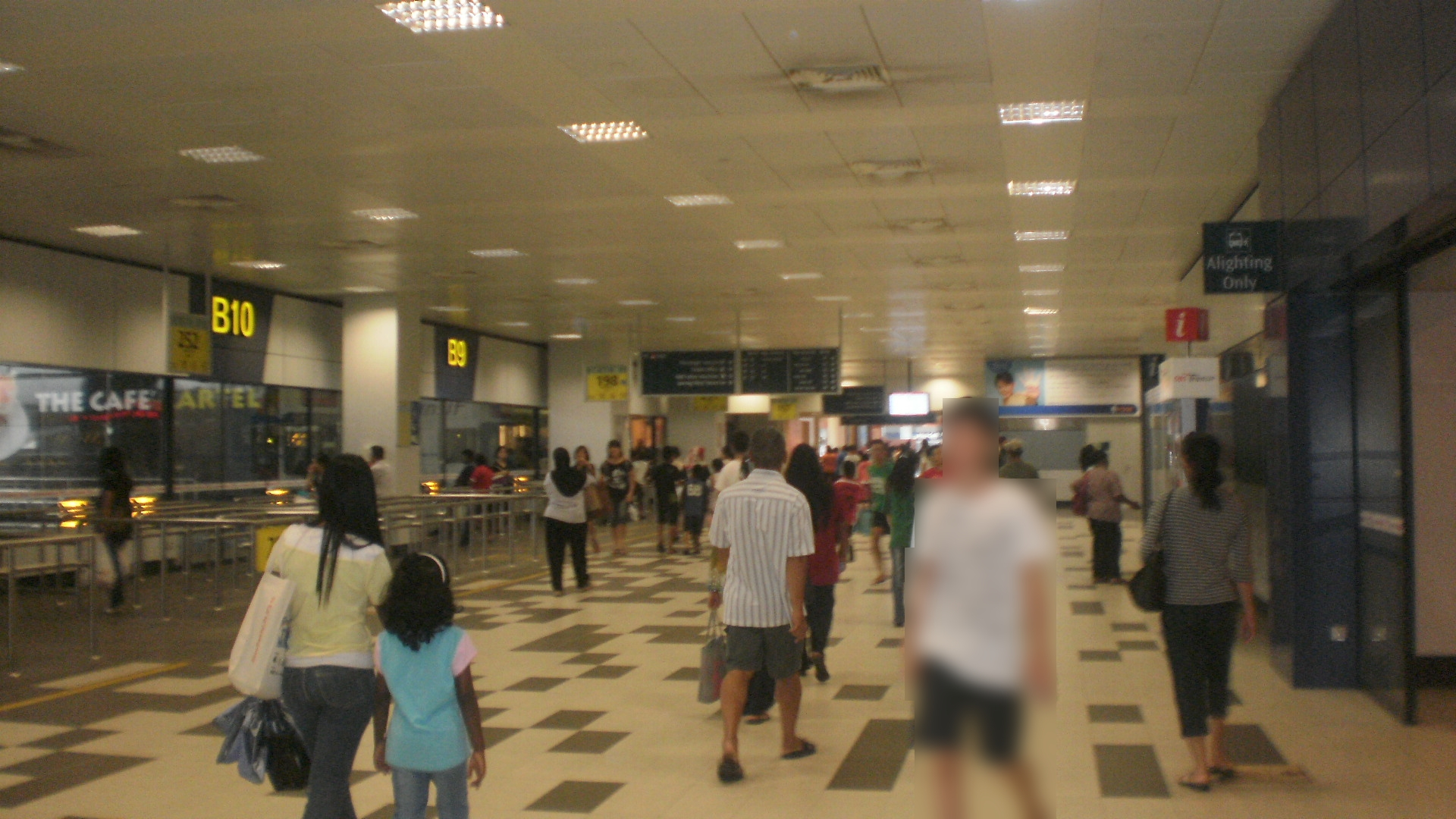
Interior of Boon Lay Bus Interchange

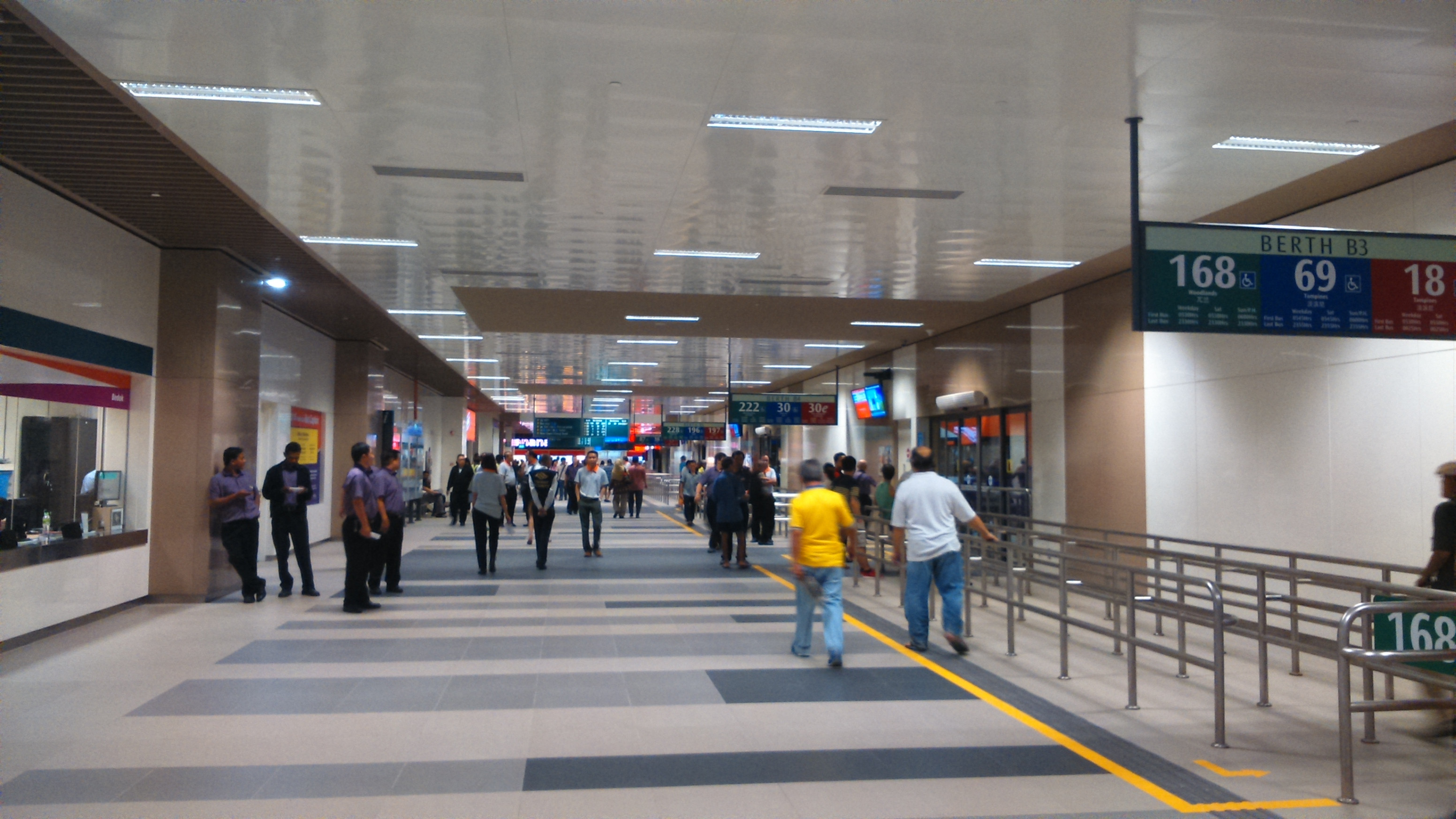
Interior of Bedok Bus Interchange

In the 1970s with the formation of Singapore Bus Service (SBS), the terminals of private companies were inherited by SBS. Many of these terminals were makeshift constructions without adequate facilities. The SBS embarked on a terminal improvement programme to build facilities such as more parking space, timekeeper's booths, rest areas for bus crew members, proper platforms with adequate shelter, toilets and food facilities. It also planned to construct new depots and terminals, so as to eliminate parking of buses in residential areas. Makeshift and roadside terminals were to be phased out.

The development of bus terminals was closely linked to town planning in Singapore. Densely inhabited new towns were built along major roads and a bus terminal was allocated at a suitable point inside each of them. Feeder services were used to carry passengers within the new towns to the bus terminal. With the opening of the MRT system in 1987, bus terminals were sited close to subway stations so as to integrate the subway and bus services. The 1980s also saw the building of larger bus interchanges in new towns, such as the one at Ang Mo Kio which was twice the size of the existing terminal it replaced.

== List of bus interchanges ==
There are currently 32 bus interchanges in Singapore, served by four bus operators, with three more under construction and seven more under planning. Lor 1 Geylang Bus Terminal and Upper East Coast Bus Terminal were replaced by Kallang Bus Interchange (Rebuilt as Integrated Transport Hub) and Bedok South Bus Interchange. To improve seamless connectivity with the rail network, selected interchanges in housing estates are slowly being rebuilt as Integrated Transport Hubs (ITHs).

Bus interchange	Bus package (anchor)	Planning area	Number of routes	Number of berths	First opened	Latest reopening	Operator	Connections
Bishan	Bishan–Toa Payoh	Bishan	10	6 (total); 4 (boarding); 2 (alighting)	30 April 1989		SBS Transit	NS17 CC15; Bishan
Bukit Batok	Bulim	Bukit Batok	14	23 (total); 18 (end-on); 3 (boarding); 2 (alighting)	27 September 1987		Tower Transit Singapore	NS2; Bukit Batok
Bukit Merah	Bukit Merah	Bukit Merah	14	9 (total); 6 (boarding); 3 (alighting)	28 September 1980		SBS Transit	
Choa Chu Kang	Choa Chu Kang–Bukit Panjang	Choa Chu Kang	15	9 (total); 5 (boarding); 4 (alighting)	8 April 1990	16 December 2018	SMRT Buses	NS4 JS1 BP1; Choa Chu Kang
Eunos	Serangoon–Eunos	Geylang	9	6 (total); 4 (boarding); 2 (alighting)	10 December 1989		SBS Transit	EW7; Eunos
HarbourFront	Bukit Merah	Bukit Merah	10	12 (end-on)	13 January 1985		SBS Transit	NE1 CC29; HarbourFront
Hougang Central	Sengkang–Hougang	Hougang	19	10 (total); 6 (boarding); 4 (alighting)	17 December 1994		SBS Transit	NE14 CR8; Hougang
Jurong East	Bulim	Jurong East	17	11 (total); 7 (boarding); 4 (alighting)	30 June 1985	6 December 2020	Tower Transit Singapore	NS1 EW24 JE5; Jurong East
Jurong Town Hall	Bulim	Jurong East	8	8 (total); 5 (boarding); 3 (alighting)	26 November 2023		Tower Transit Singapore	NS1 EW24 JE5; Jurong East
Punggol	Loyang	Punggol	18	7 (total); 5 (boarding); 2 (alighting)	30 November 2003		Go-Ahead Singapore	NE17 CP4 PTC; Punggol
Sembawang	Sembawang–Yishun	Sembawang	7	5 (total); 3 (boarding); 2 (alighting)	20 November 2005		Tower Transit Singapore	NS11; Sembawang
Tampines	Tampines	Tampines	23	17 (total); 3 (end-on); 8 (boarding); 6 (alighting)	29 November 1987		Go-Ahead Singapore	EW2 – DT32; Tampines
Tampines Concourse	Tampines	Tampines	1	3 (total); 2 (boarding); 1 (alighting)	18 December 2016		Go-Ahead Singapore	EW2 – DT32; Tampines
Tampines North	Tampines	Tampines	5	5 (total); 4 (boarding); 1 (alighting)	27 November 2022		Go-Ahead Singapore	CR6; Tampines North
Tengah	Bulim	Tengah	6	9 (total); 6 (boarding); 3 (alighting)	21 July 2024		Tower Transit Singapore	
Woodlands Temporary	Woodlands	Woodlands	5	5 (total); 3 (boarding); 2 (alighting)	12 March 2016		SMRT Buses	NS9 TE2; Woodlands
Yio Chu Kang	Seletar	Ang Mo Kio	9	6 (total); 4 (boarding); 2 (alighting)	13 December 1987		SBS Transit	NS15; Yio Chu Kang
Integrated Transport Hub
Ang Mo Kio	Seletar	Ang Mo Kio	16	9 (total); 6 (boarding); 3 (alighting)	10 April 1983	28 April 2007	SBS Transit	NS16 CR11; Ang Mo Kio
Bedok	Bedok	Bedok	27	15 (total); 10 (boarding); 5 (alighting)	25 February 1979	30 November 2014	SBS Transit	EW5; Bedok
Boon Lay	Jurong West	Jurong West	27	21 (total); 11 (end-on); 6 (boarding); 4 (alighting)	1 July 1990	27 December 2009	SMRT Buses	EW27 JS8; Boon Lay
Buangkok	Sengkang–Hougang	Buangkok	3	7 (end-on)	1 December 2024		SBS Transit	NE15; Buangkok
Bukit Panjang	Choa Chu Kang–Bukit Panjang	Bukit Panjang	11	5 (total); 3 (boarding); 2 (alighting)	26 December 1999	4 September 2017	SMRT Buses	DT1 – BP6; Bukit Panjang
Clementi	Clementi	Clementi	14	8 (total); 5 (boarding); 3 (alighting)	16 November 1980	26 November 2011	SBS Transit	EW23 CR17; Clementi
Joo Koon	Jurong West	Pioneer	8	5 (total); 3 (boarding); 2 (alighting)	21 November 2015		SMRT Buses	EW29; Joo Koon
Pasir Ris	Loyang	Pasir Ris	16	13 (total); 8 (end-on); 3 (boarding); 2 (alighting)	10 December 1989	27 April 2025	Go-Ahead Singapore	EW1 CR5 CP1; Pasir Ris
Punggol Coast	Loyang	Punggol	4	7 (total); 4 (boarding); 3 (alighting)	29 June 2025		Go-Ahead Singapore	NE18; Punggol Coast; PW2 Teck Lee
Sengkang	Sengkang–Hougang	Sengkang	9	7 (total); 4 (boarding); 3 (alighting)	28 April 2001	18 January 2003	SBS Transit	NE16 STC; Sengkang
Serangoon	Serangoon–Eunos	Serangoon	9	5 (total); 3 (boarding); 2 (alighting)	13 March 1988	3 September 2011	SBS Transit	NE12 CC13; Serangoon
Toa Payoh	Bishan–Toa Payoh	Toa Payoh	21	21 (total); 14 (end-on); 4 (boarding); 3 (alighting)	26 December 1983	19 May 2002	SBS Transit	NS19; Toa Payoh
Woodlands	Woodlands	Woodlands	23	18 (total); 14 (boarding); 4 (alighting)	4 February 1996	13 June 2021	SMRT Buses	NS9 TE2; Woodlands
Woodleigh	Serangoon–Eunos	Bidadari	3	5 (total); 3 (boarding); 2 (alighting)	20 April 2025		SBS Transit	NE11; Woodleigh
Yishun	Sembawang–Yishun	Yishun	24	12 (total); 8 (boarding); 4 (alighting)	23 August 1987	8 September 2019	Tower Transit Singapore	NS13; Yishun

=== Expansion to existing interchanges ===
Tampines Concourse Bus Interchange is a bus interchange located along Tampines Concourse in Tampines. First announced by the Land Transport Authority in November 2014, it serves as an extension of Tampines Bus Interchange. It commenced operations on 18 December 2016.

=== Future bus interchanges ===
Below is a list of planned and under-construction bus interchanges.

Bus interchange	Planning area	Opening	Connections	Status	Ref(s)
Beauty World	Bukit Timah	2028; 2 years' time	DT5; Beauty World	Under construction	
Bedok South	Bedok	By 2030; 4 years' time	TE30; Bedok South	Tender awarded	
Changi Airport Terminal 5	Changi	TBA	TE32 CR1; Changi Terminal 5	Under planning	
Chencharu	Yishun	TBA		Under construction	
Gul Circle	Pioneer	TBA	EW30 CR23; Gul Circle	Under planning	
Kallang	Kallang	By 2030; 4 years' time	EW10; Kallang	Under construction	
Marina South	Straits View	By 2040; 14 years' time	TE21; Marina South	Under planning	
Mount Pleasant	Novena	TBA	TE10; Mount Pleasant	Under planning	
Tiong Bahru	Bukit Merah	TBA	EW17; Tiong Bahru	Under planning	
Turf City	Bukit Timah	TBA	CR14; Turf City	Under planning	
Woodlands North	Woodlands	Around 2030; 4 years' time	TE1 – RTS; Woodlands North	Under planning	

=== Future Integrated Transport Hubs ===
Some existing bus interchanges are also planned to be rebuilt as ITHs:

- Bishan Bus Interchange
- Choa Chu Kang Bus Interchange
- Hougang Bus Interchange (under construction)
- Jurong East Bus Interchange (under construction)
- Tampines Bus Interchange
- Tampines North Bus Interchange (under construction)
- Tengah Bus Interchange

== List of bus terminals ==
Bus terminals are distinct from bus interchanges in Singapore. While bus interchanges are often air-conditioned and integrated with other connecting MRT lines, with some also part of Integrated Transport Hubs, bus terminals are a lot more bare-bones with only a small number of bus berths available. Additionally, not all bus terminals allow for boarding or alighting at the terminal.

Bus terminals	Bus packages	Planning area	Routes	Berths	Opening	Operator	Connections	Remarks	Refs
Beach Station Bus Terminal	—N/a	Southern Islands	4; 1 (SBS Transit); 3 (Sentosa Development Corp)	13 (End-on)	First opened: 15 January 2007; Served by public buses: 30 July 2017	Sentosa Development Corp	Sentosa Express		
Buona Vista Bus Terminal	Clementi (anchor); Bukit Merah (tenant)	Queenstown	8; 7 (SBS Transit); 1 (SMRT Buses)	—N/a	Old: 1970s Reconfigured: 2012	SBS Transit		No boarding or alighting allowed	
Changi Airport Terminal 2 Bus Terminal	Loyang	Changi	8; 3 (SBS Transit); 1 (Tower Transit); 3 (Go-Ahead); 1 (SMRT Buses)	5 (Boarding/alighting)	1 June 1991	SBS Transit	CG2 Changi Airport		
Changi Business Park Bus Terminal	Tampines (anchor); Loyang (tenant)	Changi	2	12 (End-on)	20 December 2015	Go-Ahead Singapore			
Changi Village Bus Terminal	Serangoon–Eunos (anchor); Loyang (tenant)	Changi	4; 2 (SBS Transit); 2 (Go-Ahead)	1 (Boarding/alighting)	1975	SBS Transit			
Gali Batu Bus Terminal	Choa Chu Kang–Bukit Panjang	Woodlands	3; 2 (SMRT Buses); 1 (Tower Transit)	—N/a	23 January 2021	SMRT Buses		No boarding or alighting allowed	
Ghim Moh Bus Terminal	Clementi	Queenstown	3	1 (Boarding/alighting)	Old: late 1970s Relocated: 1986	SBS Transit			
Kampong Bahru Bus Terminal	Bukit Merah	Bukit Merah	9; 5 (SBS Transit); 1 (SMRT Buses); 3 (Go-Ahead)	4 (Boarding); 2 (Alighting)	10 March 2018	SBS Transit	CC31 Cantonment		
Kent Ridge Bus Terminal	Clementi	Queenstown	10; 5 (SBS Transit); 1 (Go-Ahead Singapore); 4 (NUS Internal Shuttle)	1 (Boarding/alighting)	16 August 1981	SBS Transit			
Lorong 1 Geylang Bus Terminal	Sembawang–Yishun (anchor); Serangoon–Eunos (tenant)	Kallang	8; 4 (SBS Transit); 2 (SMRT Buses); 2 (Tower Transit)	1 (Boarding); 1 (Alighting)	Old: May 1971; Existing: 2013	Tower Transit Singapore	EW10 Kallang		
Marina Centre Bus Terminal	Bukit Merah	Downtown Core	8; 3 (SBS Transit); 3 (Tower Transit); 2 (SMRT Buses)	—N/a	Old: 30 November 1986; Extension built: June 2015; Existing: 24 February 2021	SBS Transit		No boarding or alighting allowed	
Queen Street Bus Terminal	Bukit Merah	Rochor	1	1 (Boarding); 1 (Alighting)	Old: 1940s–1950s Existing: 13 October 1985	SBS Transit		Also serves Causeway Link and Singapore–Johore Express	
Resorts World Sentosa Bus Terminal	—N/a	Southern Islands	1 (SBS Transit); Other bus services	1 (Boarding/alighting)	21 November 2015	Sentosa Development Corp	Sentosa Express		
Rumah Tinggi Bus Terminal		Bukit Merah	1	1 (Boarding); 1 (Alighting)	25 October 2025	SBS Transit			
St Michael's Bus Terminal	Bishan–Toa Payoh	Novena	7; 6 (SBS Transit); 1 (Go-Ahead Singapore)	13 (End-on)	1980s	SBS Transit			
Shenton Way Bus Terminal	Bukit Merah	Downtown Core	9; 7 (SBS Transit); 1 (SMRT Buses); 1 (Tower Transit)	1 (Boarding)	Old: 1970s First relocation: 20 June 1987; Second relocation: 26 April 2010; Existing: 25 June 2017	SBS Transit	CC32 Prince Edward Road	No alighting allowed	
Sims Place Bus Terminal	Serangoon–Eunos	Aljunied	3	1 (Boarding/alighting)	13 December 1976	SBS Transit			
Tuas Bus Terminal	Jurong West	Tuas	5	1 (Boarding); 1 (Alighting)	Old: 2 January 1998; Existing: 7 October 2017	SMRT Buses	EW33 Tuas Link		
Upper East Coast Terminal	Bedok	Bedok	8; 6 (SBS Transit); 1 (Go-Ahead Singapore); 1 (Tower Transit)	2 (Boarding); 2 (Alighting)	9 December 2001	SBS Transit			

=== Buona Vista Bus Terminal ===
Buona Vista Bus Terminal (location:1°18′33″N 103°47′11″E) is located at Holland Drive in Buona Vista estate in Queenstown. The terminal is located adjacent to Buona Vista Community Centre, and close to Buona Vista MRT station. Unlike most other terminals, it does not allow passenger boarding or alighting on the site itself.

Previously, the Buona Vista area was served by the Commonwealth Avenue Terminal, located at the intersection of Commonwealth Avenue and North Buona Vista Road. Due to the construction of the Commonwealth Avenue extension in the 1970s, a portion of the terminal was affected, resulting in the creation of a temporary terminal at Holland Drive. The temporary Holland Drive terminal (located next to the City Shuttle Service terminus), started operating in November 1975 for certain bus routes. In 1982, SBS had to vacate the Commonwealth Avenue terminal and move to a temporary terminal named North Buona Vista Terminal. By the late 1980s, the present Buona Vista terminal had become operational, and bus services to the nearby Ayer Rajah Industrial Estate were introduced.

=== Jurong Island Bus Terminal ===
Jurong Island Bus Terminal (location: 1°16′0″N 103°42′16″E) is located at the southwest of Jurong Island, serving the only form of public transport on the offshore island off the southwest coast of the main island.

The terminal was located near Oasis@Sakra, the amenity centre on the island. Initially, JTC provided shuttle bus services to and from Jurong East MRT station. Later, SBS started public bus services to Jurong Island. In 2002, two Jurong Island services were notable for being the first routes to use CNG powered buses in Singapore. However, SBS later stopped operating these services. Since then, transportation to the island has been provided by private companies.

=== Kent Ridge Bus Terminal ===
Kent Ridge Bus Terminal is located in the Kent Ridge subzone of Queenstown. It sits at a corner of Eusoff Hall of the National University of Singapore (NUS), serving the NUS campus and residential developments around Pasir Panjang and West Coast. Apart from regular public bus services, NUS Internal Shuttle Bus routes also call at the terminal.

=== Lorong 1 Geylang Bus Terminal ===
Lorong 1 Geylang Bus Terminal (location: 1°18′43″N 103°52′19″E) is located in Kallang. It sits between Geylang Road and Sims Avenue, opposite Kallang MRT station and beside the Kallang River.

The terminal was originally a fringe car park. In 1975, it was planned as a Park and Ride terminal. Under the Park and Ride scheme, drivers could park their cars and then ride the City Shuttle Service to the Central Business District. The services ran daily (except Sunday) during peak hours for 50 cents a ride. However, the Park and Ride Scheme did not prove to be very popular. Due to low ridership, the terminal was converted to a public bus terminal in 1988 and continued running under SMRT Buses (and later on Tower Transit from 3 October 2021). In 1998, Crawford Street Bus Terminal was shut down and its bus services were relocated to this terminal.

Lorong 1 Geylang Bus Terminal housed some of the last DAF buses, which were in use by SMRT Buses, as reported in November 2015. The terminal will be decommissioned in tandem with the opening of the nearby Kallang Bus Interchange.

=== Queen Street Bus Terminal ===
Queen Street Bus Terminal (location: 1°18′13″N 103°51′23″E), also known as Ban San Bus Terminal, serves as the terminal for cross-border bus and taxi services to Johor Bahru, Malaysia. It opened on 13 October 1985.

=== Upper East Coast Bus Terminal ===
Upper East Coast Bus Terminal (location: 1°19′4″N 103°57′9″E) is located along Upper East Coast Road in Bedok. The terminal was opened in 2001 after the closure of Marine Parade Bus Terminal. In April 2017, services 25 & 55 were extended to this terminal from Bedok and Siglap Road, respectively, after the terminal expansion was completed in 2017. The expansion of the Upper East Coast Bus Terminal. along with Hougang Central and Punggol bus interchanges, were carried out to accommodate new services under the Bus Service Enhancement Programme (BSEP).

Upper East Coast Bus Terminal will be decommissioned in the near future to make way for the construction of Bedok South Bus Interchange, which will also replace its bus operations when in opens by the mid-2030s. The remaining site is planned to be redeveloped into a park.

== List of bus depots ==
Bus depot	Location	Bus package	Operator	Notes	Refs
Bedok North Bus Depot	Bedok North Avenue 4	Bedok	SBS Transit	Also the terminating point for bus services 18M and 48	
Bukit Batok Bus Depot	Bukit Batok Street 23	Clementi	SBS Transit		
Bulim Bus Depot	Bulim Drive	Bulim	Tower Transit Singapore		
East Coast Integrated Depot	Koh Sek Lim Road	Tampines	Go-Ahead Singapore		
Gali Batu Depot	Jalan Gali Batu	Choa Chu Kang–Bukit Panjang	SMRT Buses		
Hougang Bus Depot	Defu Avenue 1	Serangoon–Eunos (until 13 June 2027), Bishan–Toa Payoh	SBS Transit		
Loyang Bus Depot	Loyang Way	Loyang	Go-Ahead Singapore		
Mandai Depot	Mandai Road	Sembawang–Yishun	Tower Transit Singapore		
Seletar Bus Depot	Yio Chu Kang Crescent	Seletar	SBS Transit		
Sengkang West Bus Depot	Seletar West Road 1 / 2	Sengkang–Hougang	SBS Transit		
Soon Lee Bus Depot	Soon Lee Road	Jurong West	SMRT Buses	Also the terminating point for bus services 185 and 502/502A	
Ulu Pandan Bus Depot	Business Park Drive	Bukit Merah	SBS Transit		
Woodlands Bus Depot	Woodlands Industrial Park E4	Woodlands	SMRT Buses		

=== Future bus depots ===
Bus depot	Location	Bus package	Operator	Notes	Refs
Ang Mo Kio Bus Depot	Ang Mo Kio Street 63	TBA	TBA	Under planning; ready by 2030	
Kim Chuan Depot	Hougang Close	Serangoon–Eunos	SMRT Buses	Under construction; ready by June 2027	
Lorong Halus Bus Depot	Serangoon River Road	Loyang	TBA	Under construction; ready by 2029	
Pasir Panjang Bus Depot	Harbour Drive	TBA	TBA	Under construction; ready by 2029	
Simpang Bus Depot	Yishun Avenue 8	TBA	TBA	Under construction; ready by 2029	
Tengah Depot	Tengah Close	TBA	TBA	Under construction; ready by 2028	
TBA	Jalan Ahmad Ibrahim	TBA	TBA	Under planning	

== See also ==
- List of former bus stations in Singapore
