= Punggol Bus Interchange =

Temporary bus interchange in Punggol, Singapore

Punggol Bus Interchange 榜鹅巴士转换站 Pusat Pertukaran Bas Punggol
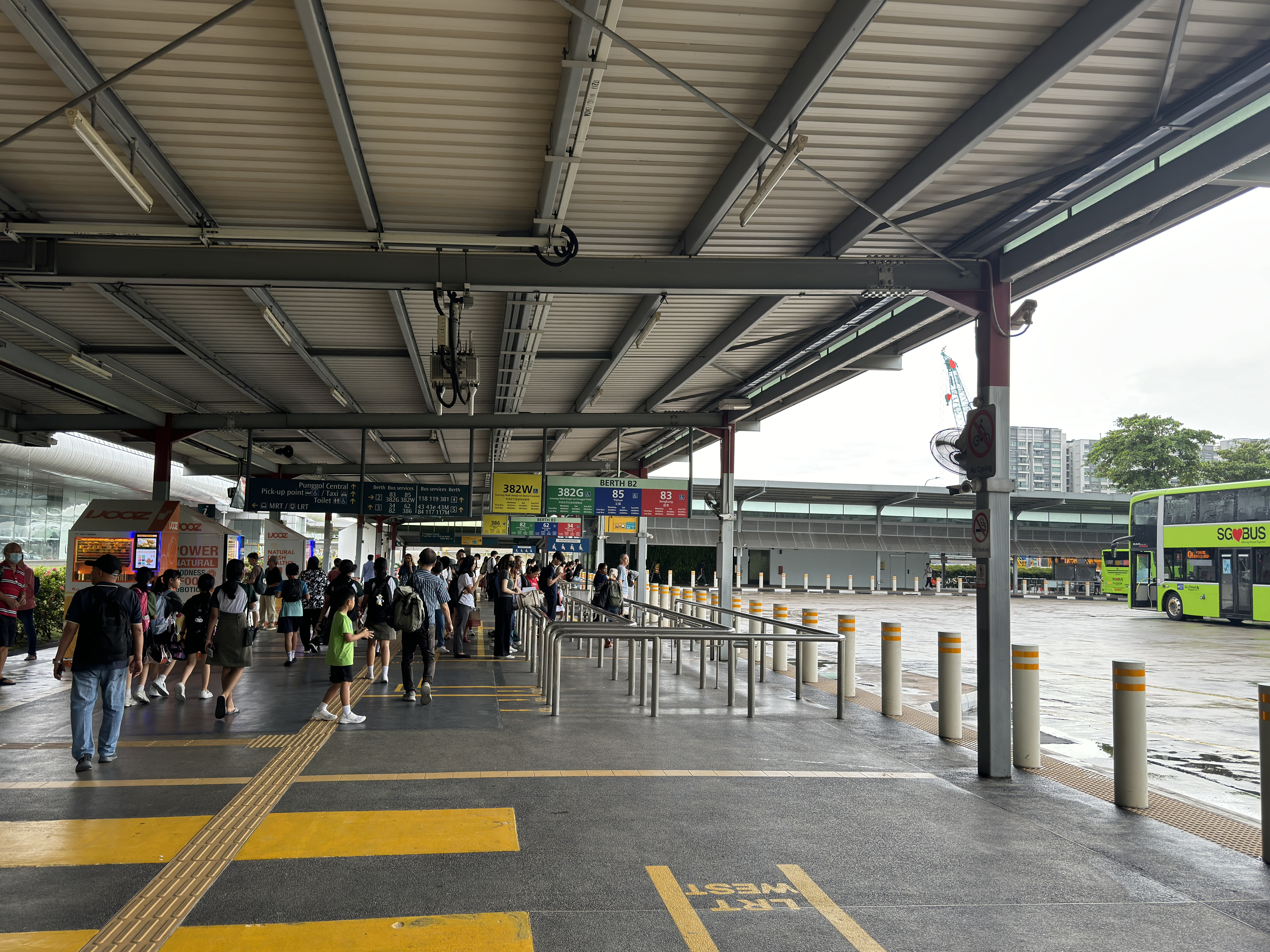
- Punggol Bus Interchange in 2024.

General information
- Location: 70A Punggol Place, Singapore 828865
- Coordinates: 1°24′15″N 103°54′8″E
- System: Public Bus Interchange
- Owner: Land Transport Authority
- Operator: Go-Ahead Singapore Pte Ltd (Go-Ahead Group plc)
- Bus routes: 16 (Go-Ahead Singapore); 1 (SBS Transit)
- Bus stands: 3 sawtooth alighting 5 sawtooth boarding
- Bus operators: Go-Ahead Singapore Pte Ltd; SBS Transit Ltd
- Connections: NE17 PTC CP4 Punggol

Construction
- Structure type: At-grade
- Accessible: Accessible alighting/boarding points Accessible public toilets Graduated kerb edges Tactile guidance system

History
- Opened: 30 November 2003; 22 years ago

Key dates
- 30 November 2003: Commenced operations
Location

Punggol Bus Interchange is a bus interchange in Punggol New Town, Singapore, located adjacent to the Punggol MRT/LRT station. The facility was initially built as a temporary bus interchange, featuring a dismantlable structure to facilitate removal should the area be redeveloped for large-scale commercial projects after Punggol New Town’s development. The bus interchange was officially opened on 30 November 2003. With the opening of the Punggol Coast Bus Interchange in June 2025, there are no plans to redevelop the current Punggol Bus Interchange.

== History ==
Before the opening of the Punggol Bus Interchange, there was only one bus terminal at Punggol, which was the Punggol Road End Bus Terminal. It had existed since the 1980s with only Services 82 and 83 serving the terminal. Service 83 was shortened to Hougang Central Bus Interchange, and renumbered Service 147 in June 1992, while Service 82 was converted to a loop service from Serangoon to Punggol Road End with the opening of the North East line. 82 was later amended to terminate at the interchange and loop at Serangoon Central, no longer serving Punggol Point. With the amendment, a new Service 84 was introduced to cover the lost sectors of Service 82 at Punggol Point.

=== Opening ===
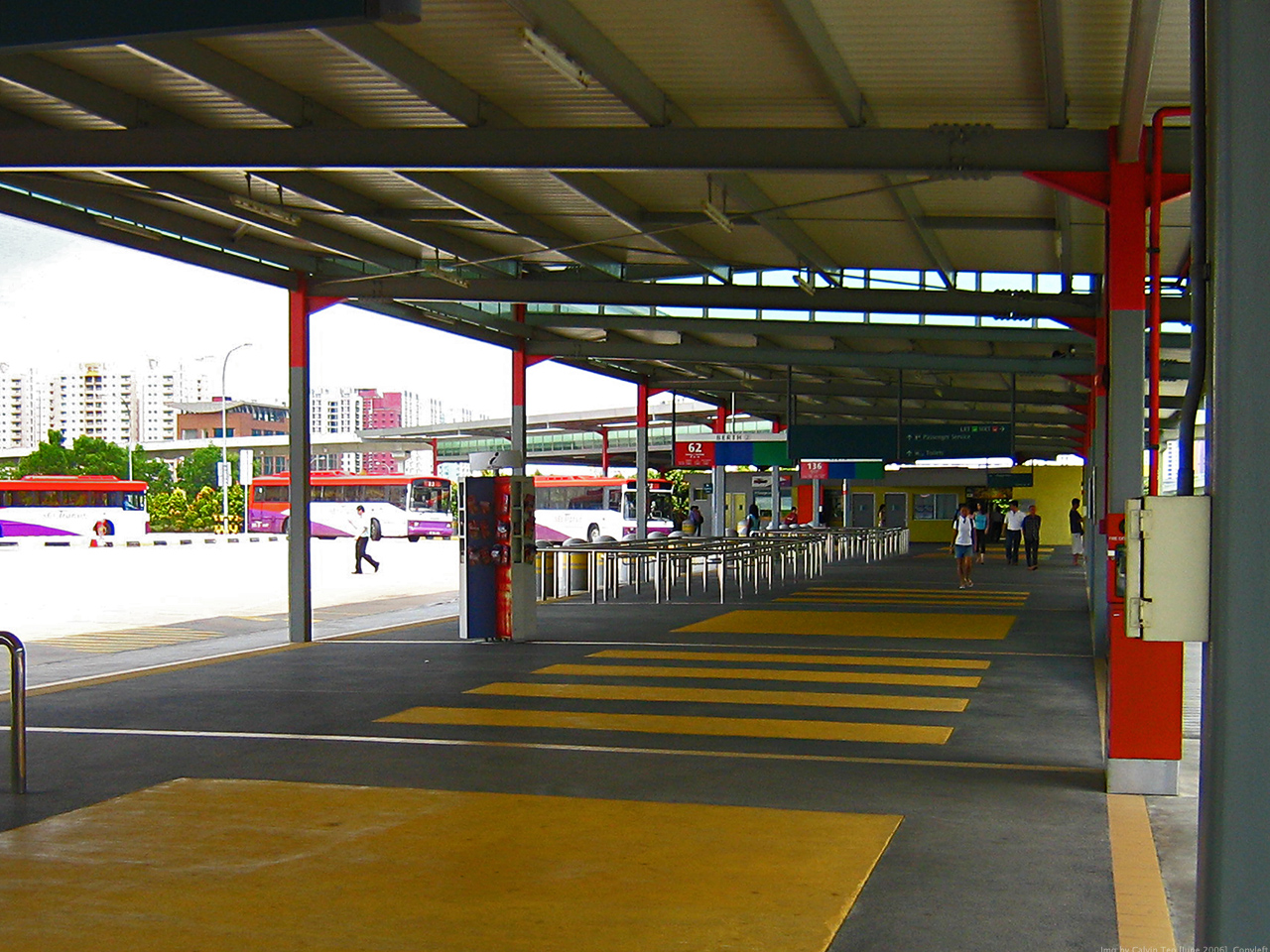
Punggol Bus Interchange in 2006

The SGD $1.9-million temporary Punggol Bus Interchange took 10 months to construct and was officially opened on 30 November 2003 by Teo Chee Hean. The Punggol Road End Bus Terminal was then closed and converted into a bus stop when the interchange started operations. The interchange was then operated by SBS Transit, but was handed over to Go-Ahead Singapore in 2016.

=== Expansion ===
In April 2015, LTA announced that the Punggol Temporary Bus Interchange will be expanded from its current 1.2 hectares (12,000 m^{2}) to 2.0 hectares (20,000 m^{2}) to cater for 13 new bus spaces on top of the current 38. New boarding berths and an expanded concourse will be added once the construction is complete. Expansion works started in the third quarter of 2015 and were completed on 1 October 2017.

== Services ==
With the opening of the interchange, Bus Service 83, plying between Sengkang and Punggol, was amended to terminate here, instead of the pair of bus-stops below Punggol. Bus Service 3 was extended from its original looping point at Pasir Ris Street 71 to provide direct links between Punggol and the new towns of Pasir Ris and Tampines, while Bus Service 62 and Bus Service 136 were extended from the former Hougang South Bus Interchange and Upper Serangoon Road to this interchange respectively.

As time went by, new services, Bus Services 34, 43, and 85 were introduced to link Punggol to Singapore Changi Airport, Upper East Coast Bus Terminal and Yishun Bus Interchange respectively.

Since 29 June 2025, bus services 34 and 117/117M no longer pass through Punggol Temporary Bus Interchange, and has instead been rerouted to head towards and terminate at Punggol Coast Bus Interchange.

== Bus Service Enhancement Programme ==
In 2015, LTA introduced the Bus Service Enhancement Programme (BSEP) to improve commuting time and planned to roll out 1,000 buses to add more bus services to improve connectivity. Punggol Bus Interchange had its first service upgrade on 21 October 2012, under the Bus Service Enhancement Programme (BSEP), Bus Service 119 was extended to terminate at Punggol Bus Interchange instead of terminating at Sengkang Bus Interchange, calling at an additional four pairs of bus stops. This was followed by the introduction of Bus Service 50 on 16 December that year between Punggol and Bishan Bus Interchange. Two more bus services, Bus Service 117, which piles between Punggol and Sembawang Bus Interchange, and Bus Service 118, which plies between Punggol and Changi Business Park Bus Terminal, were introduced on 20 December 2015.

=== New Feeder Services ===
On 17 August 2014, under the Bus Service Enhancement Programme (BSEP), the bus interchange introduced its first Feeder Bus Service 386. The service plies along Punggol North, looping at Edgefield Plains. Bus Services 382G/382W, which plies along Punggol West, looping at Sumang Link, was introduced on 3 January 2016. On 12 March 2017, Bus Service 381 was rolled out to directly connect Punggol East with Waterway Point, Punggol Plaza and schools in the area.

On 23 June 2024, Bus Service 84 was amended and divided into two bus services namely, 84G and 84W to serve the new SIT Punggol Campus within the Punggol Digital District.

== Bus contracting model ==
Under the bus contracting model, all bus services operating from Punggol Bus Interchange were divided into two bus packages, operated by two bus operators.

On 15 April 2015, the Loyang bus package was put up for tender by the Land Transport Authority. On 23 November that year, the tender was awarded to Go-Ahead Singapore Pte Ltd and as a result, Go-Ahead Singapore Pte Ltd took over the operation and management of this interchange and all bus services serving it, excluding services 50 and 117.

To ensure a smooth transition with minimal inconvenience to commuters, the 25 bus services in the contract were transferred in two tranches. The first tranche involved the transfer of Punggol Bus Interchange and the bus services 3/3A, 34/34A, 43/43M, 62/62A, 82, 83, 84, 85, 118, 119, 136, 382G/382W and 386 to Go-Ahead Singapore Pte Ltd.

Go-Ahead Singapore Pte Ltd took over Punggol Bus Interchange from 4 September 2016 onwards, marking the debut of the company in Singapore.

=== List of bus services ===
Operator	Package	Routes
Go-Ahead Singapore	Loyang	3, 43, 43A, 43e, 62, 62A, 82, 83, 84G, 84W, 85, 118, 118A, 119, 136, 381, 382A, 382G, 382W, 384, 386, 386A
SBS Transit	Bishan-Toa Payoh	50
