= Punggol Coast Bus Interchange =

Bus interchange in Singapore

Punggol Coast Bus Interchange 榜鹅海岸巴士转换站 Pusat Pertukaran Bas Pantai Punggol
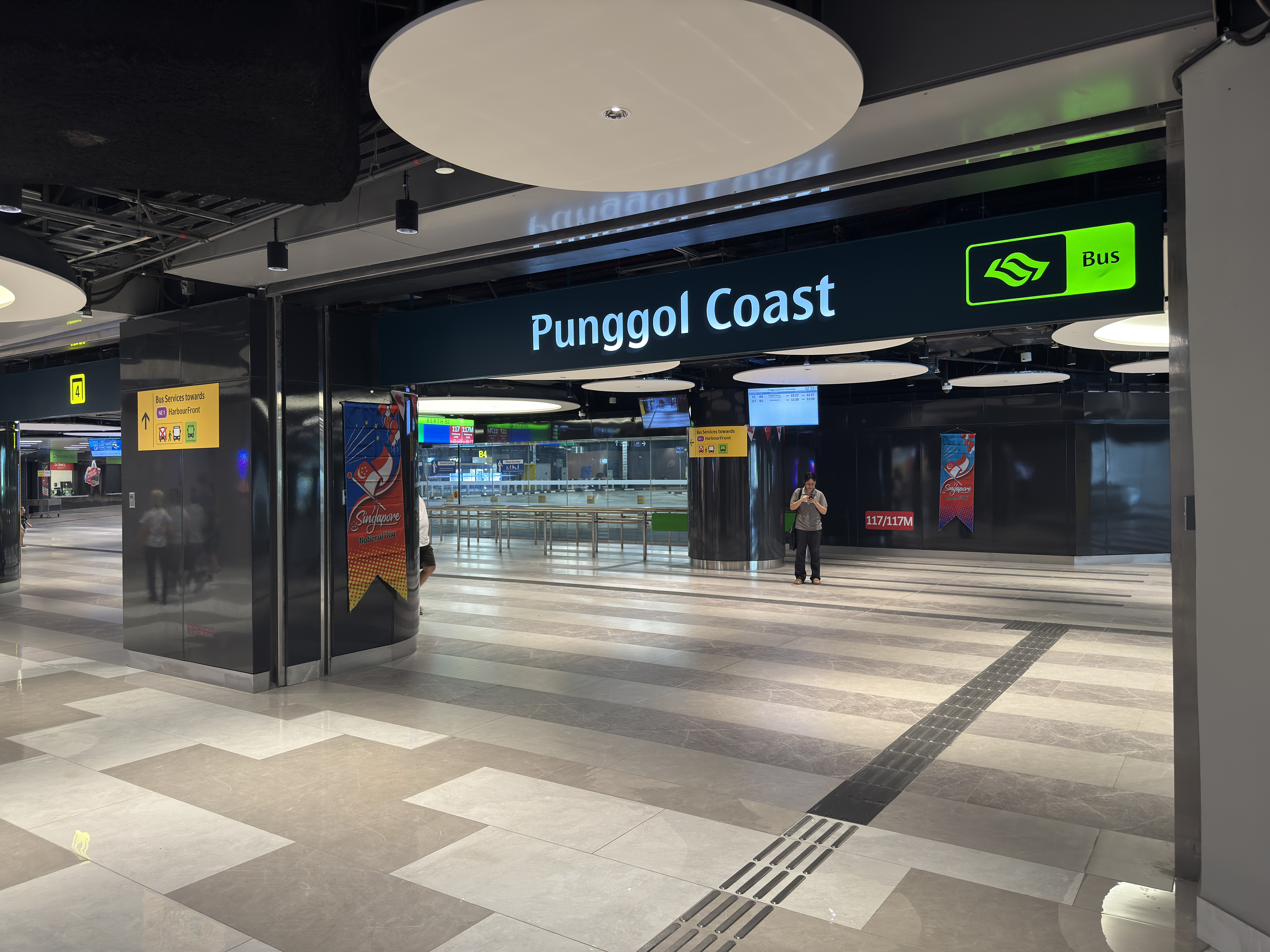
- Exit 4 of Punggol Coast Bus Interchange.

General information
- Location: 1 Sentul Walk, Singapore 829858
- Coordinates: 01°24′37.9″N 103°54′15.4″E
- System: Public Bus Interchange
- Owner: Land Transport Authority
- Operator: Go-Ahead Singapore (Go-Ahead Group)
- Bus routes: 4 (Go-Ahead Singapore); 2 (SBS Transit)
- Bus stands: 3 alighting berths 4 boarding berths
- Bus operators: Go-Ahead Singapore; SBS Transit
- Connections: NE18 Punggol Coast; PW2 Teck Lee

Construction
- Structure type: At-grade
- Accessible: Accessible alighting/boarding points Accessible public toilets Graduated kerb edges Tactile guidance system

History
- Opened: 29 June 2025; 14 months ago

Key dates
- 29 June 2025: Commenced operations
Location

Punggol Coast Bus Interchange is an air-conditioned bus interchange located at Punggol, serving the Punggol Digital District (PDD) and SIT Punggol. It is connected to Punggol Coast MRT station through Punggol Coast Mall, together forming the Punggol Coast Integrated Transport Hub (ITH).

== History ==
In 2019, through the LTMP 2040, the Land Transport Authority unveiled plans for a Punggol North ITH within the upcoming PDD, providing convenient bus and rail access for the new development and residents living in the north of Punggol. On 20 May 2025, it was announced that Punggol Coast Bus Interchange will open on 29 June.

== Bus contracting model ==
Under the bus contracting model, services operating from Punggol Coast Bus Interchange are divided into two bus packages, operated by different bus operators.

Since opening, Punggol Coast Bus Interchange has been served by existing bus services 34 and 117, which previously terminated at Punggol Bus Interchange. Bus services 104 and 44 were later launched on 26 October and 10 November 2025 respectively. Service 104 serves along the northeast region and terminates at Woodleigh Bus Interchange, while service 44 operates only during peak hours, providing shorter times to and from Changi Airport. Service 381 was extended from Punggol East to the bus interchange on 13 September 2026.

=== List of bus services ===
Operator	Package	Service	Berth	Destination	Remarks
Go-Ahead Singapore	Loyang	34	B3	↺ Changi Airport	—N/a
Go-Ahead Singapore	Loyang	34A	B3	Tampines Avenue 5 (Opp Our Tampines Hub)	Short trip service
Go-Ahead Singapore	Loyang	44	B3	Airport Boulevard (Near SATS Flight Kitchen)	Weekdays morning peak hours only
Go-Ahead Singapore	Loyang	104	B4	Woodleigh	—N/a
Go-Ahead Singapore	Loyang	381	B1	Punggol Central	—N/a
SBS Transit	Sengkang–Hougang	117	B2	Sembawang	—N/a
SBS Transit	Sengkang–Hougang	117M	B2	Sembawang	—N/a
