= Punggol station =

Punggol station is a commonly used name for Punggol MRT/LRT station, a Singaporean metro station on the North East Line (NEL) and Punggol LRT line (PGLRT).

Other stations that contain the name "Punggol" are:

- Punggol Point LRT station, an LRT station on the west loop of the PGLRT.
- Punggol Coast MRT station, another station on the NEL.

== See also ==
- Punggol
