= Punggol Digital District =

Business park in Punggol, Singapore

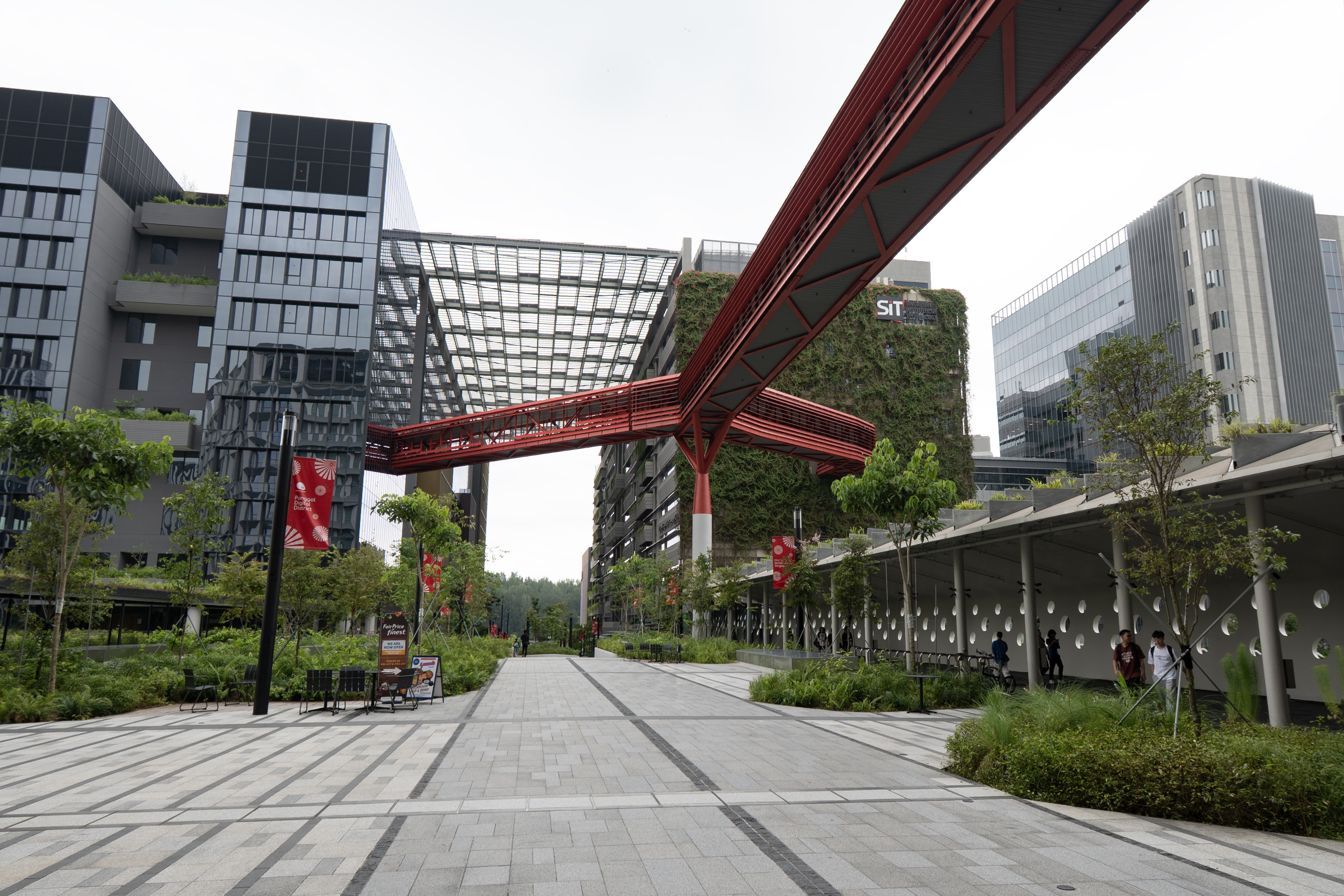
- The Punggol Digital District in 2025
- Interactive map of Punggol Digital District
- Location: Punggol, Singapore
- Coordinates: 01°24′47.96″N 103°54′41.004″E
- Opening date: 2024 (2 years ago)
- Size: 50 ha (120 acres)
- Public transit: NE18 Punggol Coast; PW2 Teck Lee; Punggol Coast
- Website: punggoldigitaldistrict.sg

The Punggol Digital District (PDD) is a business park located in the north of Punggol, Singapore. Marketed as Singapore's "Silicon Valley" and first "enterprise district", it will cover approximately 50 ha (120 acres) upon its full completion. The PDD is expected to create at least 28,000 new jobs and offer residents in Punggol and the wider North-East Region additional dining, leisure, and retail spots.

== History ==
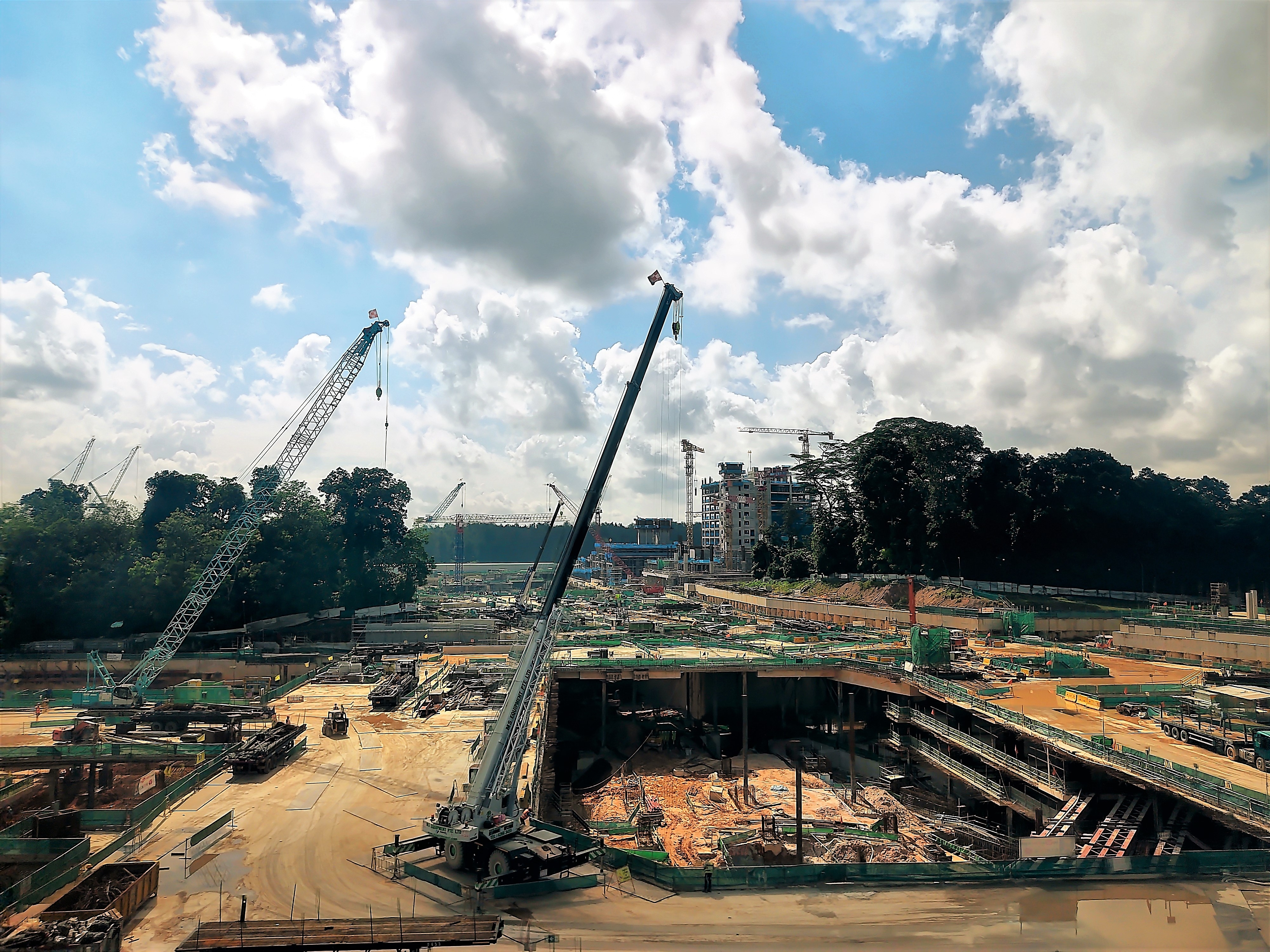
Punggol Digital District under construction in 2021

The PDD was first unveiled in 2013 under the Urban Redevelopment Authority's draft master plan as "Punggol North". On 21 January 2018, the masterplan for the PDD was launched. In July 2021, four international companies, namely Delta Electronics, Boston Dynamics, Group-IB, and Wanxiang, were confirmed to have located their future bases in the PDD. United Overseas Bank (UOB) was also expected to occupy one of the eight tower blocks by the end of 2026.

The first phase of the PDD broke ground on 17 January 2020, and opened progressively from the third quarter of 2024, covering 21 ha (52 acres). The previously non-operational Teck Lee LRT station was opened on 15 August 2024 to serve the new development. The new Punggol Coast MRT station and bus interchange were also opened on 10 December 2024 and 29 June 2025, respectively. By the middle of 2025, the Association of Information Security Professionals, dConstruct, Delteq, and GovTech had moved to the PDD, while others like OCBC Bank, United Overseas Bank (UOB) and Singapore's Cyber Security Agency were to move by 2027.

== Features ==
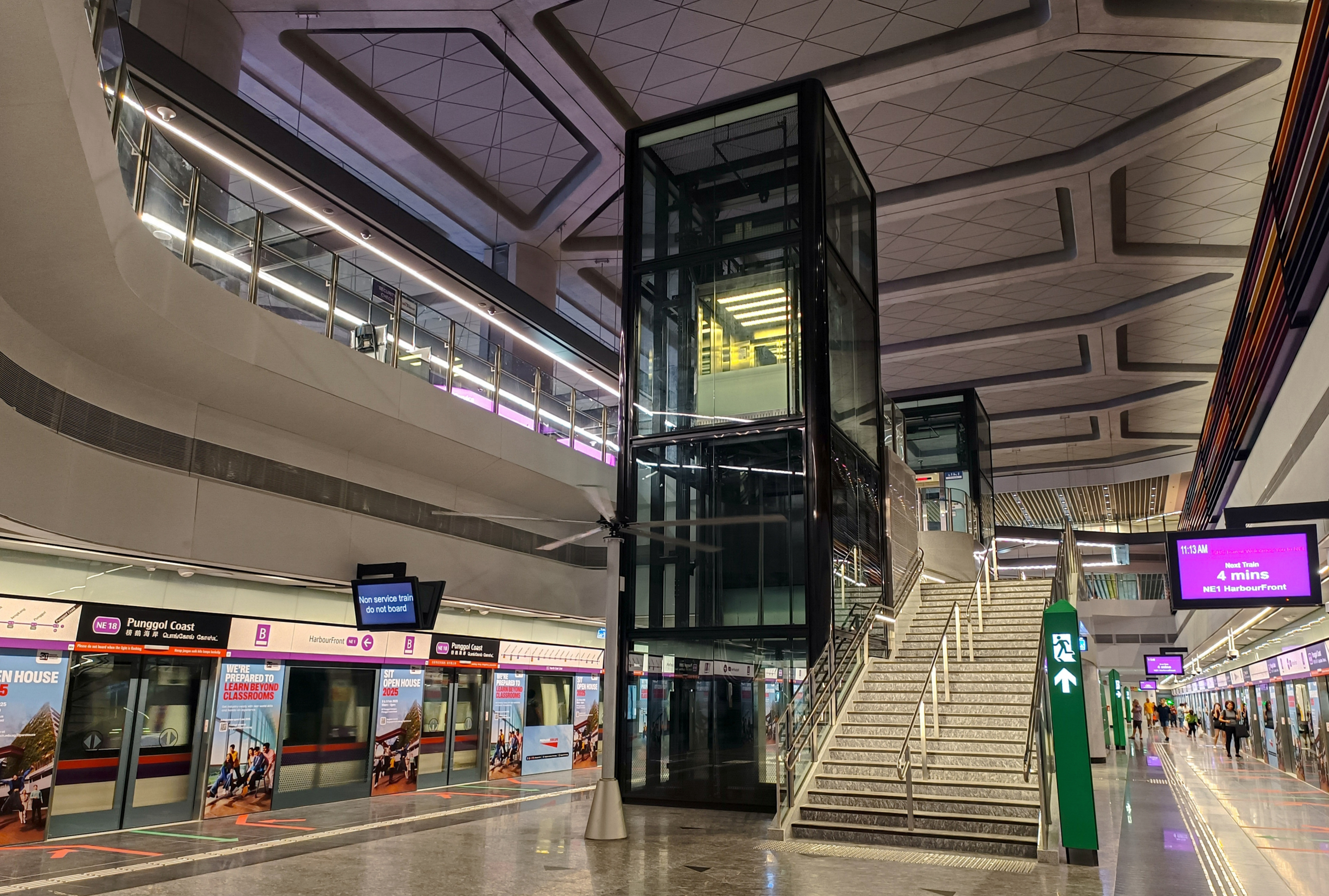
Punggol Coast MRT station serves the Punggol Digital District

=== Campus Boulevard ===
View from an escalator at the Singapore Institute of Technology campus, overlooking Campus Boulevard.

The Campus Boulevard is an 800 m (0.50 mi) pedestrianised street located in the centre of the PDD. It allows users to walk and cycle between amenities such as Punggol Coast Mall, the Singapore Institute of Technology (SIT) campus, Punggol Coast Hawker Centre, and public transport connections, including an MRT station, bus interchange, and LRT station.

=== Market Village ===
The Market Village is an upcoming waterfront recreational complex at Punggol Way, consisting of four single-storey buildings. It will be within a short walk from Coney Island.

=== Punggol Heritage Trail ===
The Punggol Heritage Trail is a partially opened 1.3 km (0.81 mi) long heritage trail following the route of the old Punggol Road. The trail preserved the flora and terrain of the old road, and features an old orange-and-white style bus stop located at where an operational bus stop used to be.

A 400 m (0.25 mi) section of the trail opened on 23 August 2025, running through the heart of the PDD. The rest of the trail will be completed by the end of 2026.

=== Singapore Institute of Technology ===
First announced in August 2015, a new 91,000 m^{2} (22 acres) SIT campus within the PDD was launched in September 2024. Being co-located with JTC's business parks, the integration of the developments encourage collaboration between industries and academia, and supports an ecosystem for digital and technology organisations. This includes trialling new technological and digital concepts before scaling them up for wider use. New ideas conceived by students can be tested in the PDD, enabling faster market access.

=== Future Catholic Junior College campus ===
On 16 January 2026, it was announced that Catholic Junior College will move its campus to a site within the PDD at Sentul Walk. Its current 5.6 ha (14 acres) site at Whitley Road will expire in 2029. The move is scheduled to be completed in 2034.

=== Future hotel ===
In 2024, it was announced that a 200-room hotel within the PDD facing Coney Island is in the plan. The hotel site was awarded to Verdant View in March 2026, with a scheduled opening in the first half of 2027.
