= Woodleigh MRT station =

Mass Rapid Transit station in Singapore

Woodleigh NE11 兀里 உட்லீ
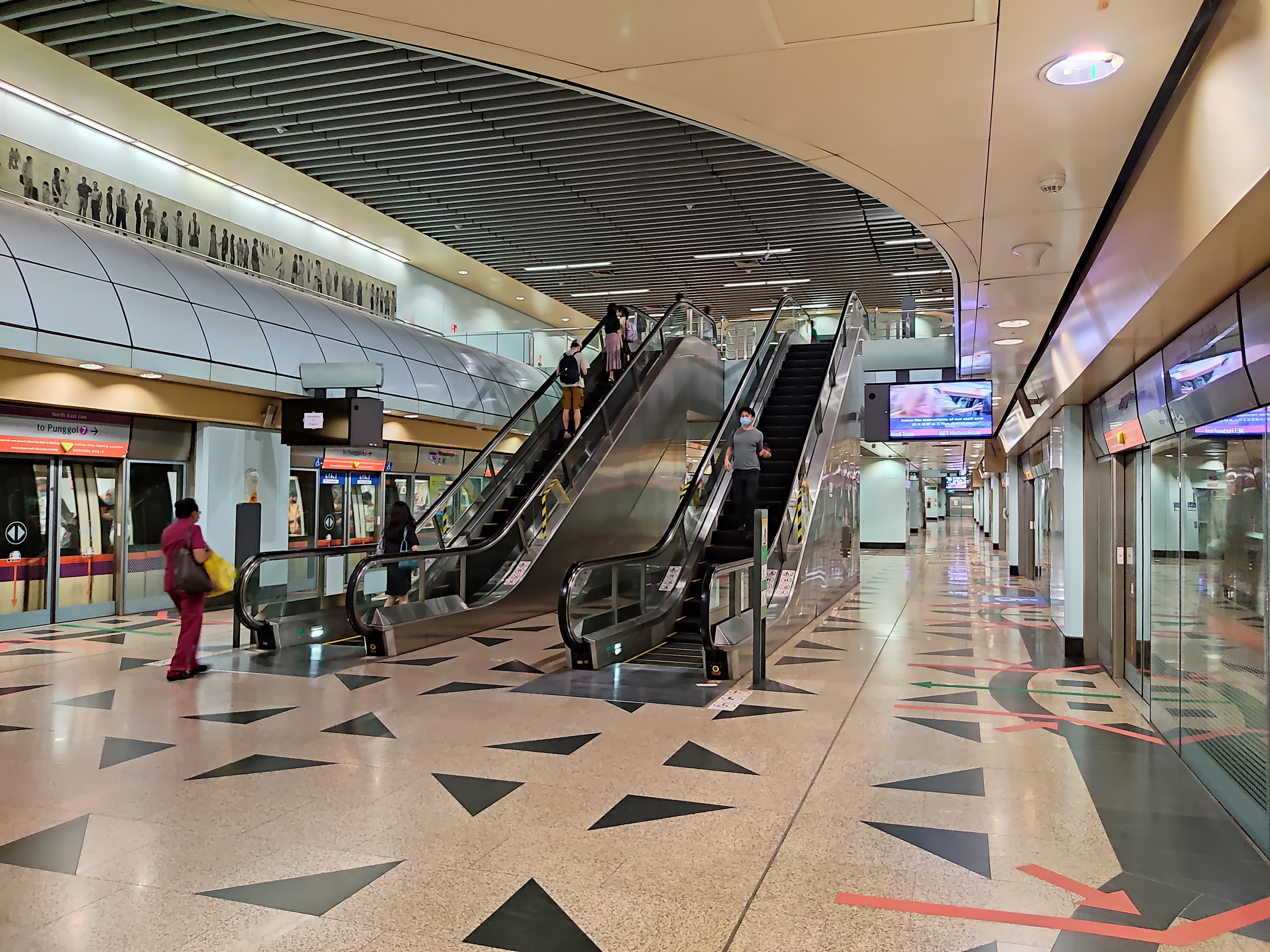
- Platform level of Woodleigh station

General information
- Location: 400 Upper Serangoon Road, Singapore 347695
- Coordinates: 01°20′21″N 103°52′15″E
- System: Mass Rapid Transit (MRT) station
- Owner: Land Transport Authority
- Operator: SBS Transit
- Line: North East Line
- Platforms: 2 (1 island platform)
- Tracks: 2
- Connections: Woodleigh, Taxi

Construction
- Structure type: Underground
- Platform levels: 1
- Accessible: Yes

Other information
- Station code: WLH

History
- Opened: 20 June 2011; 15 years ago

Passengers
- June 2024: 11,844 per day

Services
Preceding station	Mass Rapid Transit	Following station
Potong Pasir towards HarbourFront	North East Line	Serangoon towards Punggol Coast
Track layout
Location
- Location within Singapore Rail central area

Woodleigh MRT station is an underground Mass Rapid Transit (MRT) station on the North East Line (NEL), in Bidadari, Singapore. The station is underneath Upper Serangoon Road, near the junction with Upper Aljunied Road. Areas served include the Bidadari Estate, Stamford American International School and Woodleigh Residences. The station is also linked to Woodleigh Bus Interchange.

Woodleigh was first announced along with the 16 NEL stations in March 1996. Though it was completed along with the rest of the NEL in June 2003, the station remained closed due to the lack of local developments. It eventually opened in June 2011. As with most of the NEL stations, it is a designated Civil Defence shelter. Woodleigh station features an Art-in-Transit public artwork Slow Motion by April Ng, depicting commuters going about their daily lives, on 30 zinc panels.

== History ==
The North East Line (NEL) project, which was first proposed in 1984, received government approval in January 1996. Woodleigh station was among the sixteen NEL stations announced by communications minister Mah Bow Tan in March that year. To minimise operating costs, Woodleigh was not planned to open along with the other NEL stations. The original plan was to build only the structural shell of Woodleigh station, but it was later decided to build it fully, as it would have been more costly to wait until later to complete the station from the structural shell.

The contract for the station's construction and 2.5 km (1.6 miles) of bored tunnels was awarded to a joint venture consisting of Wayss & Freytag, Econ Corporation and Chew Eu Hock Construction. The S$317 million contract (US$342 million in 2022) included the construction of the adjacent Serangoon station and a vehicular viaduct along Upper Serangoon Road. Though the station was fully equipped and ready for operations in 2003, transport minister Yeo Cheow Tong explained in July that the station might not open for seven or eight years. The station would begin operating once the area around it was sufficiently developed. In November 2009, Transport Minister Raymond Lim said the government would no longer leave completed stations mothballed. At the same time, residents living near Woodleigh station had written letters to the newspapers petitioning for its early opening. In response, SBS Transit said the station would commence operations together with the opening of the Stamford American International School, which was scheduled for completion in August 2011. (Note: Nevertheless, in 2021, the Land Transport Authority announced that Mount Pleasant and Marina South of the Thomson–East Coast Line would remain unopened until the completion of their respective surrounding residential developments.)

With preparations for the station's opening ongoing since the second half of 2010, The Straits Times transport correspondent Christopher Tan speculated that the station would open in mid-2011 to serve new developments in the area. In a parliamentary session in March, Transport Minister Lim confirmed that Woodleigh station would open on 20 June 2011. Before its opening, the station was refurbished and repainted, and SBS Transit staff tested the station equipment and lighting.

On the opening day, several commuters, who were unaware that Woodleigh station had opened, alighted there by accident, having intended to alight at the adjacent Serangoon station. The operator SBS Transit deployed several staff to assist the confused commuters.

=== Security incident ===
On 18 April 2017, Woodleigh station was closed for about three hours after a suspicious substance was found in various areas in the station. All trains skipped Woodleigh station during the closure. The station reopened at 4:20 pm after police established the substance to be baking flour. Authorities arrested a 69-year-old man that same day for "causing public alarm" and summoned two other men to help with police investigations. The investigation revealed that the three men were members of the running group Seletar Hash House Harriers, who intended to mark a trail for other runners to follow (known as "hashing"). The man responsible was fined S$1000 (US$746.3) for causing a public nuisance.

== Station details ==
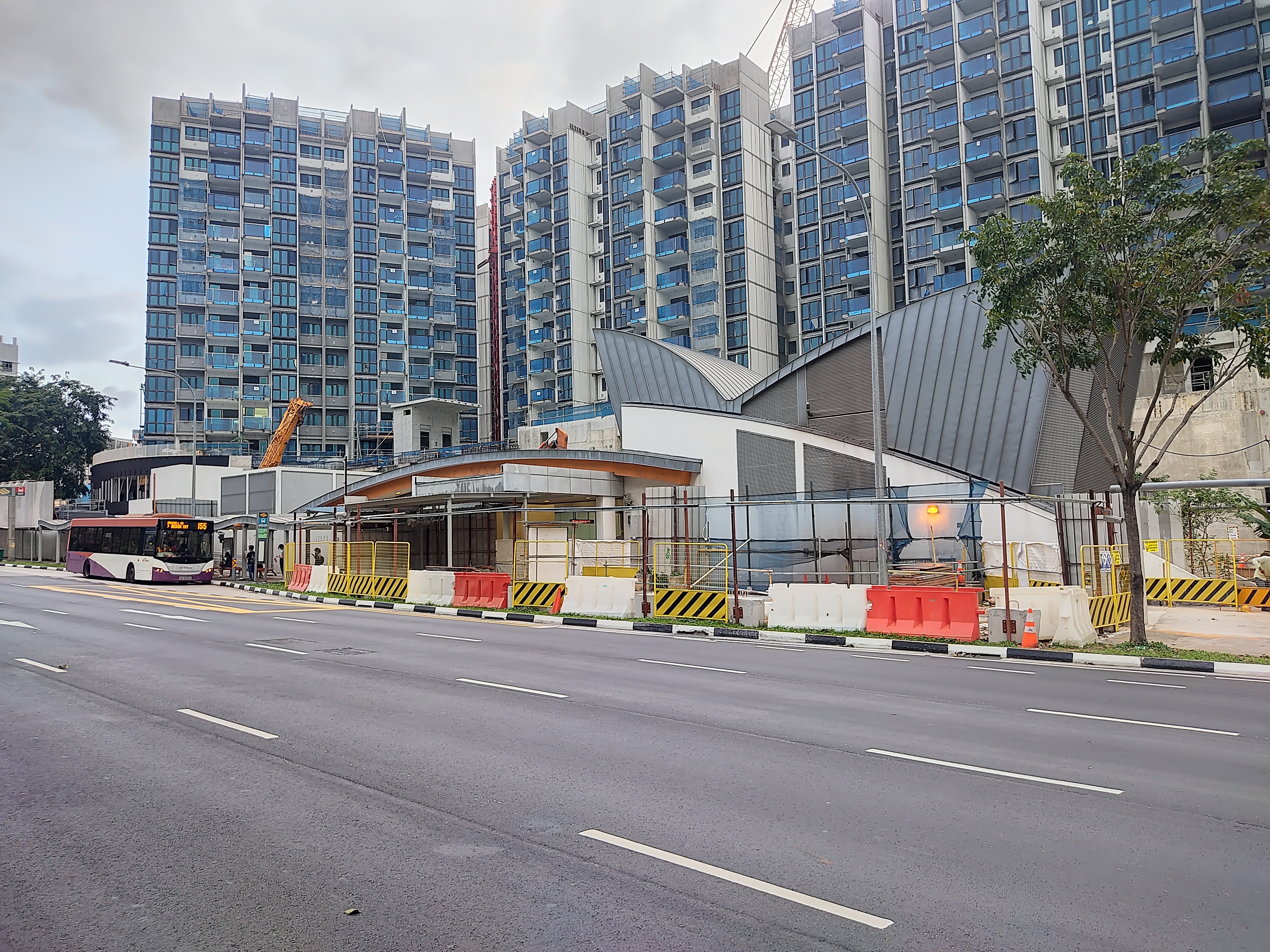
Exit A of the station in front of the developing Bidadari Estate

Woodleigh station serves the North East Line (NEL) of the Singapore MRT and is between the Potong Pasir and Serangoon stations. The station code is NE11. Being part of the NEL, the station is operated by SBS Transit. The station operates daily from about 5:36 am to 12:30 am, with train frequencies varying from 2.5 to 5.0 minutes.

Woodleigh station is located underneath Upper Serangoon Road, near the junction with Upper Aljunied Road. The three entrances of the station serves Stamford American International School, Mount Vernon Columbarium and Mount Vernon Sanctuary, along with various residential developments in the area such as Avon Park. Woodleigh station also serves the developing Bidadari public housing estate. The station is next to Woodleigh Residences – an upcoming integrated commercial and residential development part of the estate's future town centre which would include a bus interchange. After delays caused by engineering challenges and the COVID-19 pandemic, Woodleigh Bus Interchange opened on 20 April 2025.

Each of the three entrances has a curved canopy with aluminium louvres; these are linked to the taxi stands and bus stops near the station. The windows at the entrances allow commuters to have a view of the station's surroundings. The station is designated as a Civil Defence (CD) shelter: it is designed to accommodate at least 7,500 people and withstand airstrikes and chemical attacks. Equipment essential for the operations in the CD shelter is mounted on shock absorbers to prevent damage during a bombing. When electrical supply to the shelter is disrupted, there are backup generators to keep operations going. The shelter has dedicated built-in decontamination chambers and dry toilets with collection bins that will send human waste out of the shelter.

Like all other NEL stations, the platforms are wheelchair-accessible. A tactile system, consisting of tiles with rounded or elongated raised studs, guides visually impaired commuters through the station. Dedicated tactile routes connect the station entrances to the platforms.

=== Public artwork ===
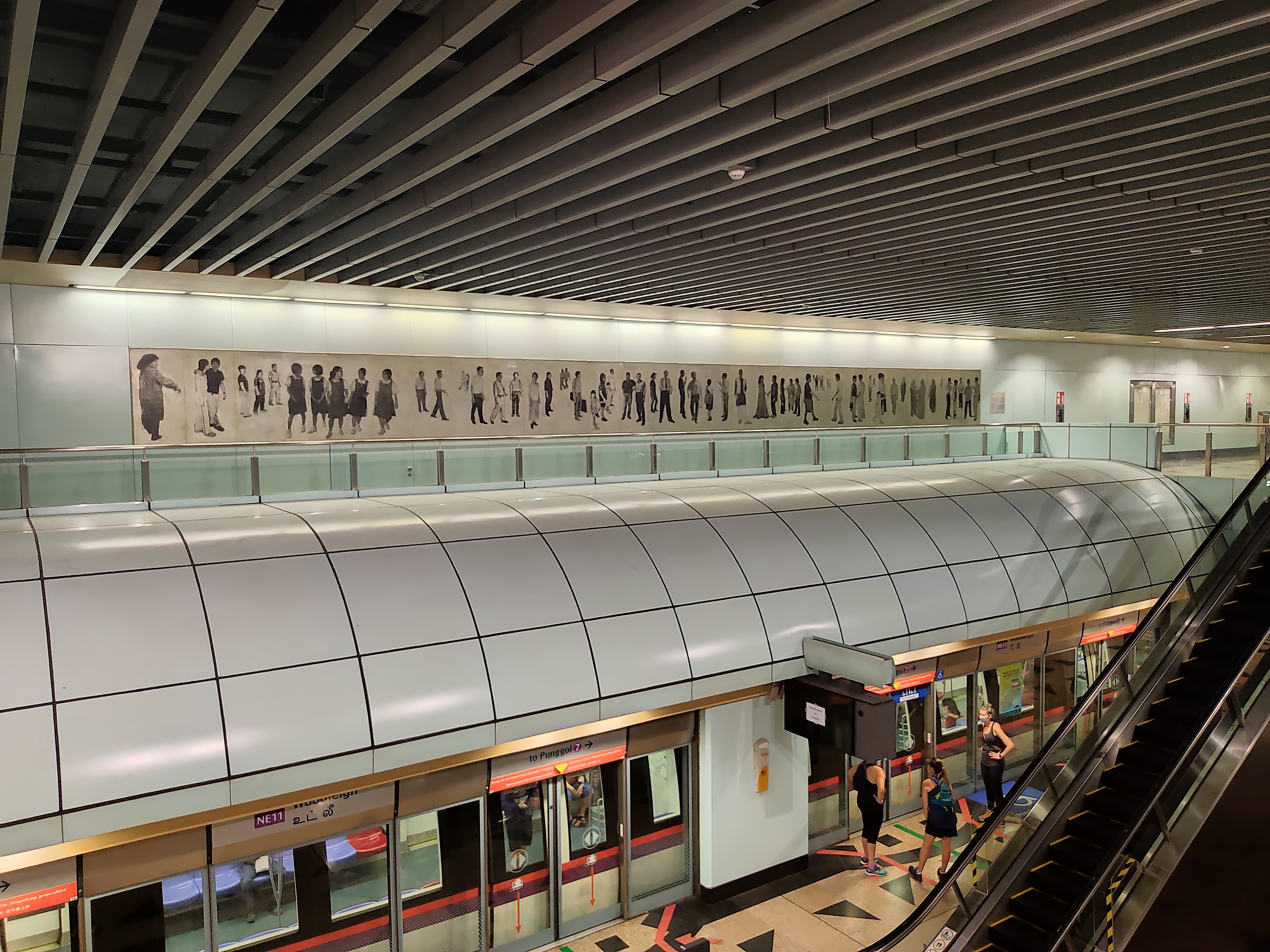
The station's artwork at the concourse level

Commissioned as part of the MRT network's Art-in-Transit programme, a showcase of public artworks on the MRT network, April Ng's Slow Motion is displayed on the station walls at the concourse level. A "snapshot" of Singapore's urban life, the work is printed on thirty zinc panels, and depicts commuters going about their daily lives.

Ng had previously used photo etching to create pictures of her friends as their farewell gifts; the gifts were well-received and hence she decided to use the technique again for Slow Motion. Ng used photos that showed the diversity of Singapore's culture, representing people of all races and ages. She took the photos herself, using LTA staff and the Woodleigh station construction crew as subjects, along with photos of her friends and her husband and son. The LTA wanted the Art-in-Transit works to have a "wayfinding" element to help guide commuters towards the platforms or out of the station, and Ng attempted to achieve this by making sure that some of the photos were of people moving in the appropriate direction.

Ng chose zinc instead of copper because the photos she took reproduced better in zinc. The choice of zinc fit in well with the station's design, which used zinc in the roof materials. Singapore's high humidity caused problems during the photo-engraving process. To create the images, a polymer film had to be applied to the zinc plates. The humidity caused the film to stick to the plates immediately, so that it could not be adjusted. Ng was able to resolve the problem by spraying the film and plates with water before applying the film.
