= Woodleigh Bus Interchange =

Bus interchange in Singapore

Woodleigh Bus Interchange 兀里巴士转换站 Pusat Pertukaran Bas Woodleigh
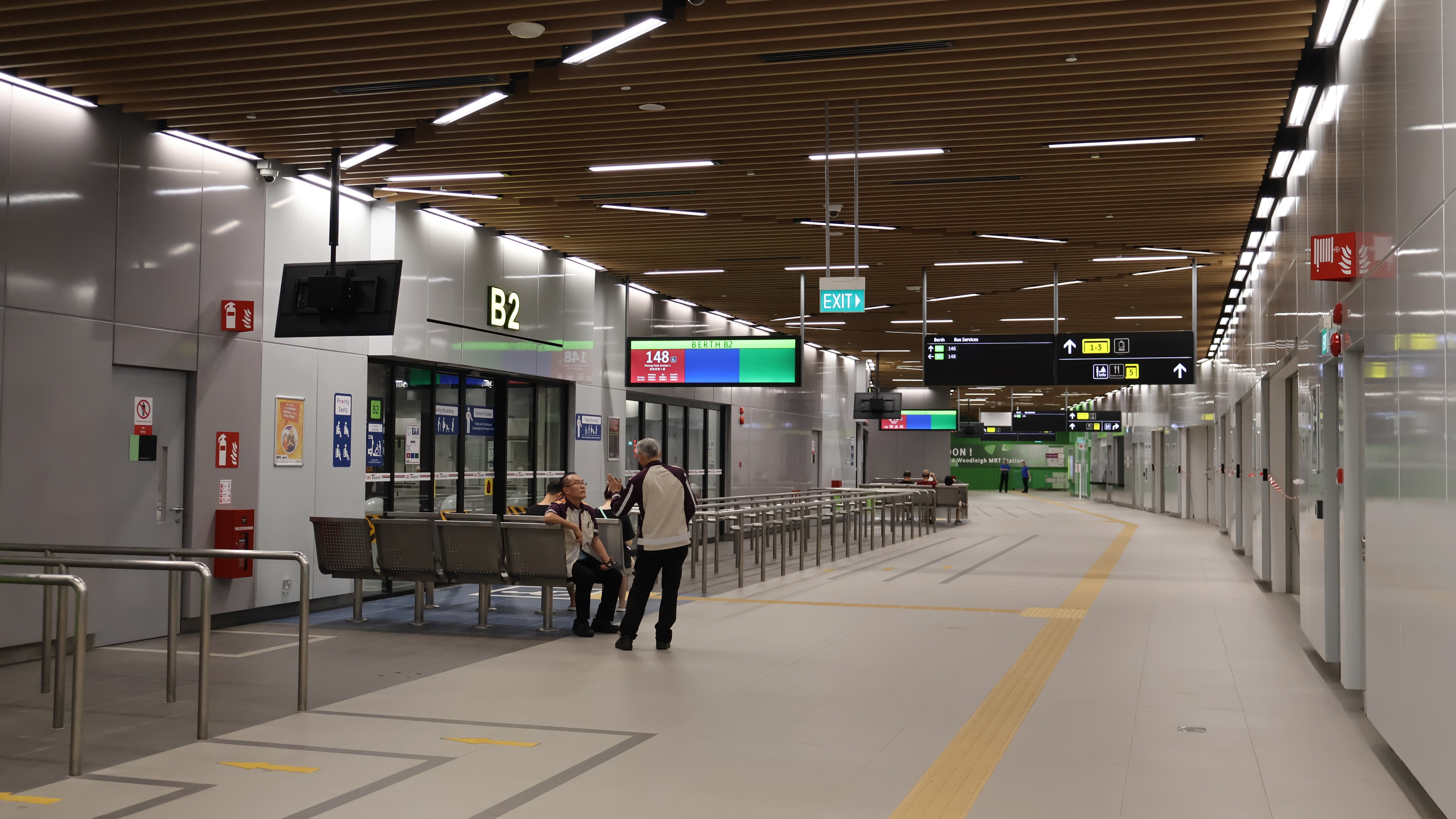

General information
- Location: 203 Bidadari Park Drive, Singapore 360203
- System: Public Bus Interchange
- Owner: Land Transport Authority
- Operator: SBS Transit
- Bus routes: 2 (SBS Transit); 1 (Go-Ahead Singapore)
- Bus stands: 2 Alighting Berths (1 Rigid, 1 Articulated); 3 Sawtooth Boarding Berths (1 Articulated, 2 Rigid)
- Bus operators: SBS Transit; Go-Ahead Singapore
- Connections: NE11 Woodleigh

Construction
- Structure type: Underground
- Accessible: Accessible alighting/boarding points Accessible public toilets Graduated kerb edges Tactile guidance system

History
- Opened: 20 April 2025; 18 months ago

Key dates
- 20 April 2025: Commenced operations

Woodleigh Bus Interchange is an air-conditioned bus interchange located at Bidadari, serving residential areas around Bidadari, Bartley, Joo Seng and Potong Pasir. As Singapore's first air-conditioned underground bus interchange to be built beneath public housing flats, it forms part of the HDB Woodleigh Village mixed-use development, comprising 330 Build-to-Order (BTO) flats, a hawker centre, retail shops and other community amenities. It is also linked with Woodleigh MRT station to form the Woodleigh Integrated Transport Hub.

== History ==
A bus interchange under an upcoming housing estate in Bidadari was first announced in September 2014, then slated to be ready by 2019. The opening date was later pushed to 2021, and again in February 2024 to end-2024, before finally getting a set date of 20 April 2025 earlier that same month, five months after it was handed over to the Land Transport Authority (LTA) by HDB. Originally named Bidadari Bus Interchange as referenced in LTA's Land Transport Master Plan 2040, it was later renamed as Woodleigh Bus Interchange, after its connecting MRT station of the same name.

== Bus contracting model ==
Under the bus contracting model, bus services operating from Woodleigh Bus Interchange are divided into two Bus Packages, operated by two different bus operators.

The interchange is served by Bus Service 146 and Service 148, which was then newly introduced. Bus service 104 was launched on 26 October 2025, replacing service 43M which plied a similar route, and serving the northeast region between Bidadari and Punggol Coast.

There were initial plans for bus services 81 and 82 to be extended from Serangoon to Woodleigh Bus Interchange via Bartley Road by the end of 2026.

=== List of bus services ===
Operator	Package	Service	Berth	Destination	Remarks
Go-Ahead Singapore	Loyang	104	B3	Punggol Coast	—N/a
SBS Transit	Serangoon–Eunos (Until June 2027)	146	B1	↺ Hougang Street 21 (Loop)	—N/a
SBS Transit	Serangoon–Eunos (Until June 2027)	148	B2	↺ Potong Pasir Ave 1 (Loop)	—N/a
SMRT Buses	Serangoon–Eunos (From June 2027)	146	B1	↺ Hougang Street 21 (Loop)	—N/a
SMRT Buses	Serangoon–Eunos (From June 2027)	148	B2	↺ Potong Pasir Ave 1 (Loop)	—N/a
