= Punggol Coast MRT station =

Mass Rapid Transit station in Singapore

Punggol Coast NE18 榜鹅海岸 பொங்கோல் கோஸ்ட்
- Platforms of Punggol Coast station

General information
- Location: 101 New Punggol Road, Singapore 828604
- Coordinates: 01°24′55″N 103°54′40″E
- System: Mass Rapid Transit (MRT) terminus
- Owner: Land Transport Authority
- Operator: SBS Transit
- Line: North East Line
- Platforms: 2 (1 island platform)
- Tracks: 2
- Connections: Punggol Coast, Taxi

Construction
- Structure type: Underground
- Platform levels: 1
- Parking: Yes
- Cycle facilities: Yes
- Accessible: Yes

History
- Opened: 10 December 2024; 23 months ago

Services
Preceding station	Mass Rapid Transit	Following station
Punggol towards HarbourFront	North East Line	Terminus
Track layout
Location
- Location within Singapore Rail

Punggol Coast MRT station is an underground Mass Rapid Transit (MRT) station on the North East Line (NEL) in northern Punggol, Singapore. The station is the terminus of the NEL and serves the Punggol Digital District alongside the new campus of the Singapore Institute of Technology. It is also close to Coney Island and serves the Punggol Coast Bus Interchange. It is located in a walking distance to Teck Lee and Punggol Point stations on the Punggol West Light Rail Transit (LRT) Loop. Nearby developments include: Punggol Coast Mall, Northshore Plaza I, Northshore Plaza II, and Waterway Point. The Punggol Settlement, Punggol Beach and Punggol Point Park is easily accessible from the Punggol Coast MRT station.

The station was built as part of the North East Line extension (NELe), which was first announced in 2013. Plans for the NELe construction were brought forward from 2030 to 2023 in conjunction with development plans for the area. Due to the COVID-19 pandemic, the expected operational date of the station was pushed back to 2024. The station opened for revenue service on 10 December 2024. An artwork, Trajectories by Zul Othman, is displayed at this station as part of the MRT network's Art-in-Transit programme.

== History ==
On 17 January 2013, transport minister Lui Tuck Yew announced a one-station extension of the NEL to serve upcoming developments in Punggol North. The NEL extension (NELe) was expected to be completed in 2030 in conjunction with development plans for a new downtown in the area.

However, in June 2017, second minister for transport Ng Chee Meng announced that the 1.6 km (0.99 miles) extension would be completed in 2023 to better accommodate the area's development timeline. When completed, the station was expected to serve 75,000 passengers in the area.

=== Construction ===
The contract for the design and construction of the station was awarded to China State Construction Engineering Corporation Limited (Singapore Branch) in December 2017. The S$79 million (US$59 million) included the construction of 830 m (2,720 ft) of tunnels. Construction started in 2017, with an initial expected completion date of 2023. The construction project was overseen by the Land Transport Authority (LTA) and JTC Corporation.

External images
- Artist impression of station platforms Source: LTA
- A 3D-map of Punggol Coast station and the developments in the surrounding area Source: LTA

Part of tunnelling works was carried out near the live operations of Punggol LRT line and Punggol station. A segment of the NELe tunnels was constructed using the cut-and-cover method, which required excavation of up to 20 m (66 ft) deep. The tunnel boring machines (TBMs) for the NELe works were launched near Punggol station, with a receiving shaft at the Punggol Digital District (PDD). The TBM sensors allow precise and safe tunnelling operations, minimising any impact on the surface or other underground infrastructure. After the LTA bored the tunnels, the tunnels within the PDD were constructed by JTC. The tunnelling works for the NELe were completed on 13 November 2020 with 40% of the construction works completed.

The JTC constructed the site for the station, which also serves as structural support for the Punggol Digital District (PDD). The team had to navigate a complex framework of codes and practices for both transit and building design. Subsequently, the LTA completed the architectural work on the interior from 2022 to 2024.

With restrictions imposed on construction works due to the COVID-19 pandemic, Transport Minister Ong Ye Kung announced that the station's completion date would be delayed to 2024. In June and July 2024, NEL operations began later at 8 am on Sundays to integrate testing and commissioning works with the new station. The station was handed over to SBS Transit in August 2024. As announced by the LTA on 10 October, the station opened on 10 December 2024. Transport minister Chee Hong Tat officiated at the station's opening ceremony.

== Station details ==
Punggol Coast station is the terminus of the NEL with an official station code of NE18. The station is located in Punggol North and serves the Punggol Digital District (PDD) alongside the new Singapore Institute of Technology (SIT) campus. The station is also close to Coney Island and within walking distances to the Teck Lee and Punggol Point LRT stations on the Punggol LRT line. The station serves Punggol Coast Bus Interchange and surrounding residential areas.

Punggol Coast is an in-house design by the LTA. The station's design features columns inspired by mangroves, with each of the 11 large concourse columns extending into beams that mimic mangrove roots. The station's pendant lights and lofty ceilings contribute to a cathedral-like ambience for commuters. Punggol Coast station has 300 bicycle parking spaces and is air-conditioned by the PDD's cooling system. The station also employs a hybrid cooling approach with fans at the platform level, earning it the Green Mark Platinum Certification from the Building and Construction Authority. The multi-purpose public space around the station will be developed as an extension of the SIT campus. The station is wheelchair accessible. A tactile system, consisting of tiles with rounded or elongated raised studs, guides visually impaired commuters through the station. Wider fare gates allow easier access for wheelchair users into the station. Two of these fare gates included a facial recognition system being trialled for use by LTA staff and other public officers.

Trajectories by Zul Othman, also known as Zero, is displayed at this station as part of the MRT network's Art-in-Transit (AiT) Programme, a public art showcase which integrates artworks into the MRT network. The work is an exploration of the past, present, and future of Punggol from Othman's perspective, who had spent his teenage years cycling from Hougang to Punggol Jetty and navigating the forested areas of Punggol with his neighbourhood friends.
