= Teck Lee LRT station =

Light rail station in Singapore

Teck Lee PW2 德利 டெக் லீ
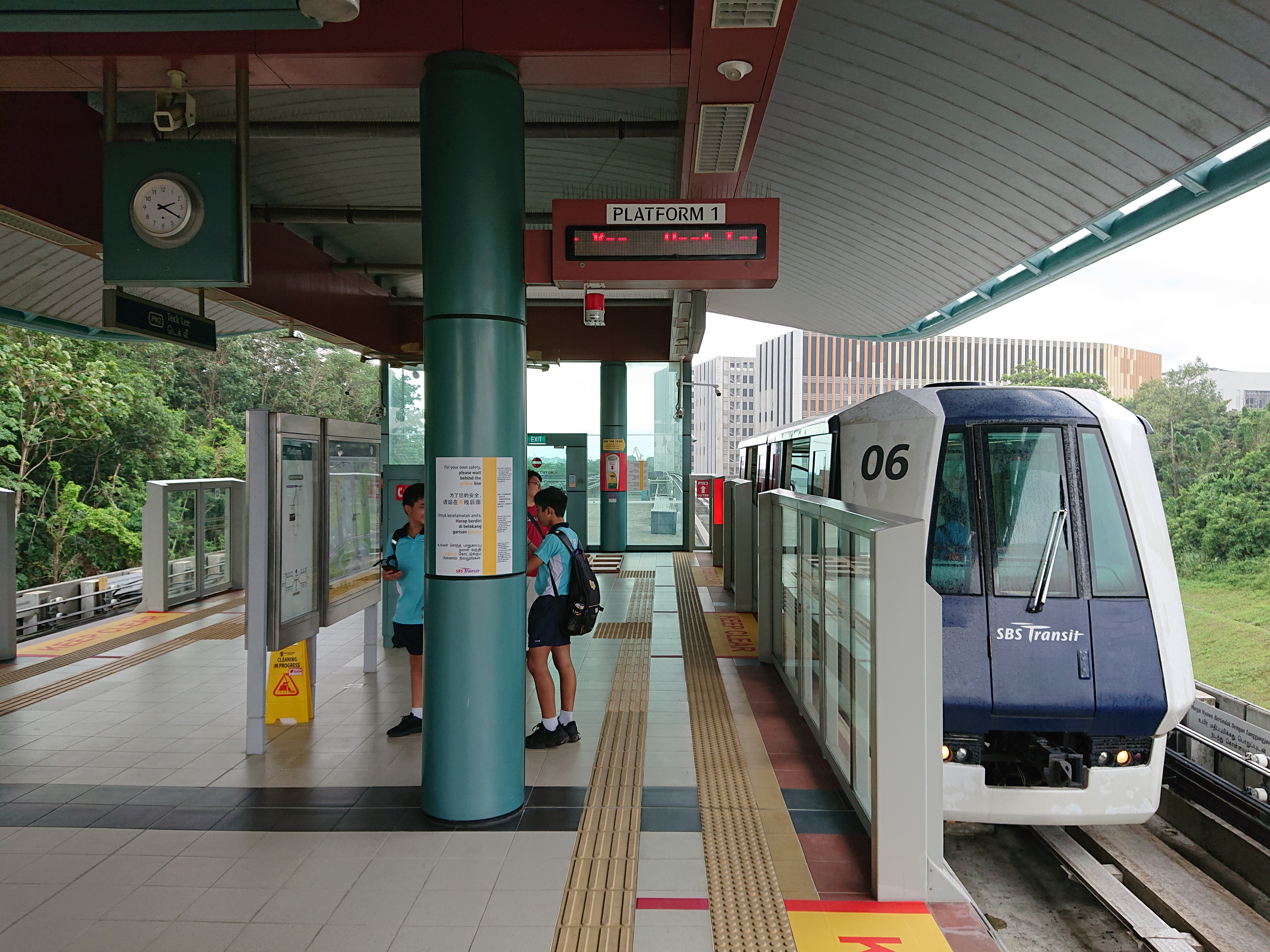
- Platform view of Teck Lee station

General information
- Location: 101 Punggol Seventeenth Avenue; Singapore 828861
- Coordinates: 1°24′46″N 103°54′24″E
- System: Light Rail Transit
- Owner: Land Transport Authority (LTA)
- Operator: SBS Transit
- Platforms: Island platform
- Tracks: 2
- Connections: Bus

Construction
- Structure type: Elevated
- Accessible: Yes
- Architect: Singapore Technologies Industrial Corporation, Mitsubishi Heavy Industries, and Mitsubishi Corporation

History
- Opened: 15 August 2024; 2 years ago

Services
Preceding station	Light Rail Transit	Following station
Sam Kee Clockwise / outer	Punggol LRT West Loop	Punggol Point Anticlockwise / inner
Location

Teck Lee LRT station is an elevated Light Rail Transit (LRT) station on the Punggol LRT line (PGLRT) West Loop in Punggol, Singapore. Operated by SBS Transit, the station serves nearby landmarks such as the Singapore Institute of Technology (SIT) Punggol campus, Punggol Coast Bus Interchange, and Saint Francis Xavier Major Seminary.

Plans for an LRT in Punggol were first unveiled in August 1996, with SBS Transit (then Singapore Bus Service) appointed as the PGLRT operator in May 1999. Construction of the PGLRT began in June 2000 and was completed in June 2004, with the LTA transferring operations to SBS Transit in December. After the opening of Samudera station in 2017, Teck Lee was the last station to be opened.

Fixed half-height platform screen doors were installed at Teck Lee along with other LRT stations in December 2017. In May 2024, SIT announced that the station would open in August, though the statement was later retracted. As announced in July, Teck Lee opened on 15 August 2024, nearly 20 years after construction was completed.

== History ==
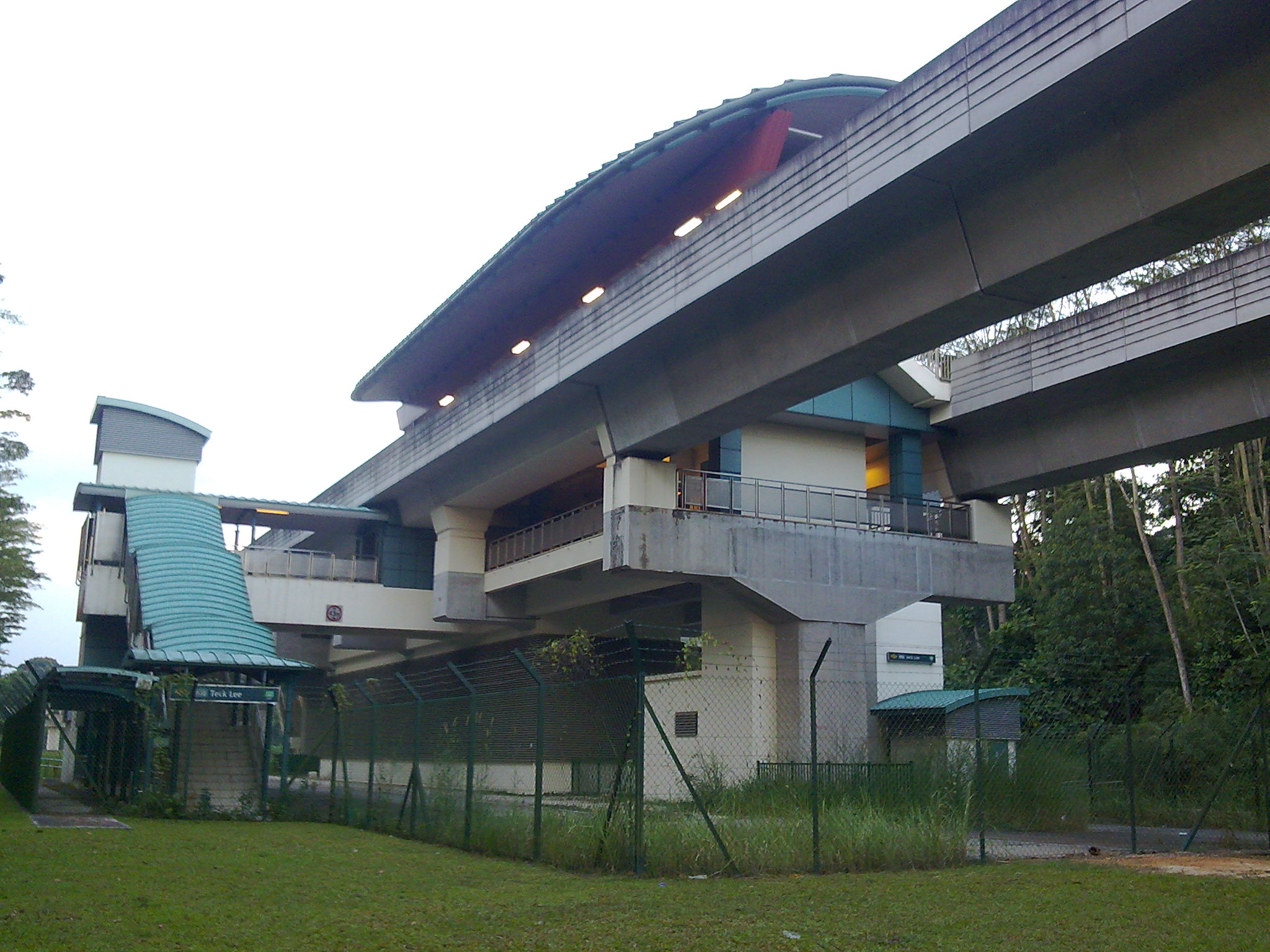
Exterior of Teck Lee station in 2009, then closed

In August 1996, prime minister Goh Chok Tong announced plans for a light rail (LRT) system in Punggol as part of the Punggol 21 housing concept, a plan intended to serve as "a model for new towns in the 21st century". The contract for the design and construction of the Sengkang and Punggol LRT lines (SPLRT) was awarded to a joint venture between Singapore Technologies Industrial Corporation, Mitsubishi Heavy Industries, and Mitsubishi Corporation in July 1998 for S$656 million (US$489.55 million). In May 1999, SBS Transit (then Singapore Bus Service) was appointed by the Land Transport Authority (LTA) to operate the SPLRT along with the North East Line on the Mass Rapid Transit (MRT) system.

Construction of the Punggol LRT line (PGLRT) began in June 2000 and was completed in June 2004, costing S$354 million (2004) (US$209.44 million). The LTA conducted test runs on the line before handing it over to SBS Transit in December 2004 for additional trial operations. After the opening of Samudera station in 2017, Teck Lee was the only PGLRT station left to be opened, with the station planned to commence operations once its surrounding area had been developed. In December 2017, Teck Lee, along with other LRT stations, had half-height fixed barriers installed. Unlike the platform screen doors on overground MRT stations, the platform barriers in LRT stations are fixed due to the limited space on the platforms and the signal control systems required for regular platform screen doors.

In May 2024, a post on the Singapore Institute of Technology's (SIT) website initially said that Teck Lee station would be opened by August. Mentions of the station in the post were removed, with a SIT spokesperson explaining that "details [were not] finalised". The LTA did not give an opening date for the station, though television network CNA said there were "indications" that Teck Lee would open by the end of 2024 to serve students enrolled in SIT's Punggol campus, which would open in September. As announced in July 2024, Teck Lee station opened on 15 August 2024, nearly 20 years after it finished construction.

== Details ==
Teck Lee station is on the PGLRT west loop with the station number of PW2, situated between Sam Kee and Punggol stations. As a part of the PGLRT, the station is operated by SBS Transit. Teck Lee operates between 5:20 am and 12:50 am on weekdays and Saturday, with services starting from 5:40 am on Sundays. Train frequencies vary from 3–5 minutes peak hour to 4–5 minutes for off peak hours. Like other LRT stations, the station has lifts and wider fare gates for wheelchair users and tactile flooring to guide visually impaired commuters through the station.

The station runs alongside Sentul Walk and has two exits serving various nearby landmarks, such as Punggol Coast Bus Interchange, SIT's Punggol campus, Punggol Waterway Park, and Saint Francis Xavier Major Seminary.
