= Go-Ahead Singapore =

Public bus operator in Singapore

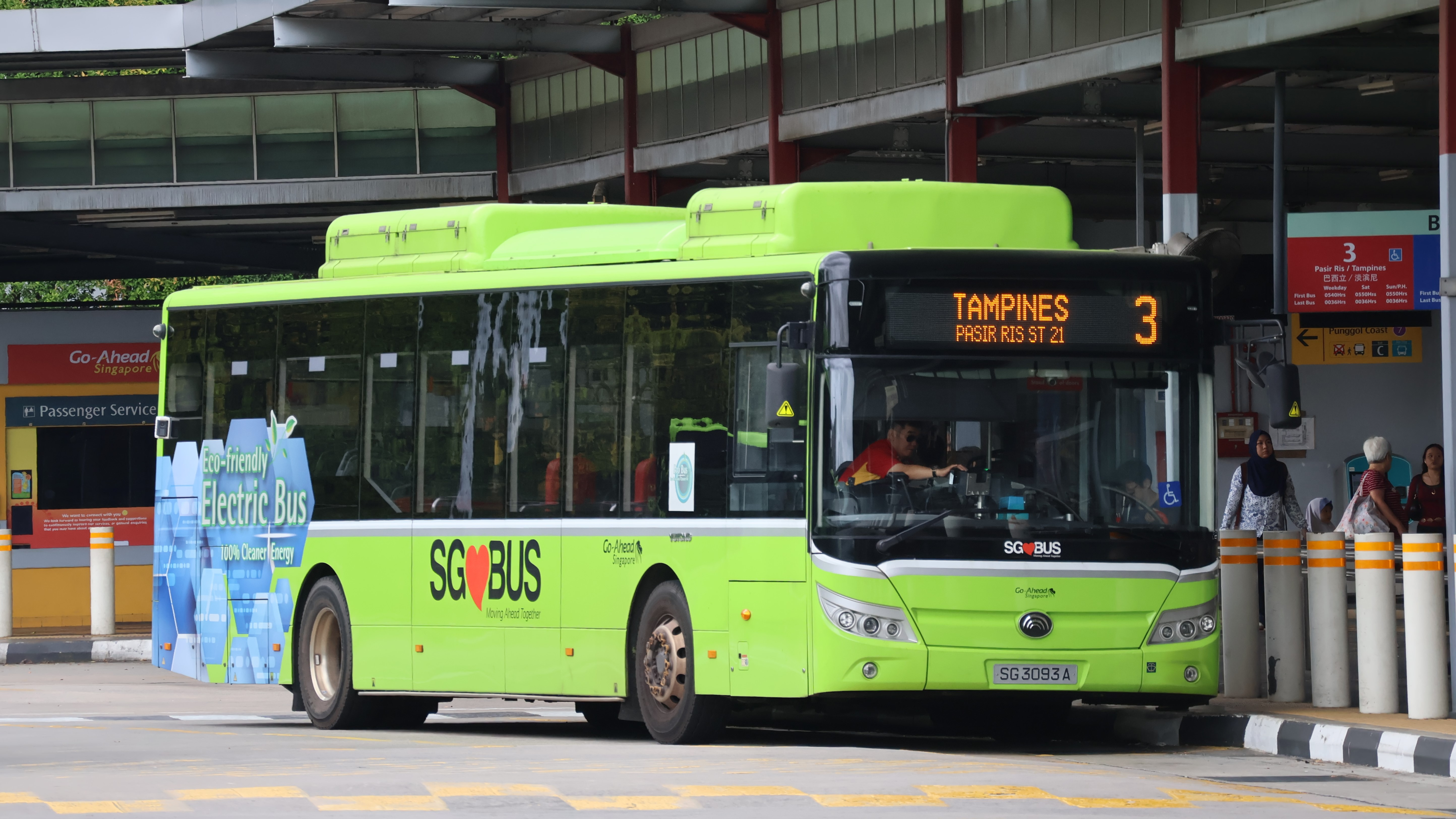
- A Yutong E12 operated by Go-Ahead Singapore
- Parent: Go-Ahead Group
- Founded: 30 November 2015; 10 years ago
- Commenced operation: 4 September 2016; 10 years ago
- Headquarters: Loyang Bus Depot; 2 Loyang Way, Singapore 508776
- Service area: Eastern Singapore
- Service type: Bus operator
- Routes: 66
- Hubs: 7 Changi Business Park; Pasir Ris; Punggol; Punggol Coast; Tampines; Tampines Concourse; Tampines North
- Stations: 13; Ang Mo Kio; Bedok; Changi Airport; Changi Village; HarbourFront; Kampong Bahru; Kent Ridge; Sengkang; Saint Michael’s; Toa Payoh; Upper East Coast; Yio Chu Kang; Yishun
- Depots: 2 Loyang; East Coast
- Fleet: 968
- Chief executive: Leonard Lee
- Website: www.go-aheadsingapore.com

Go-Ahead Singapore is a contracted bus operator operating in Singapore. It commenced operations on 4 September 2016 and it is a subsidiary of the Go-Ahead Group.

== History ==
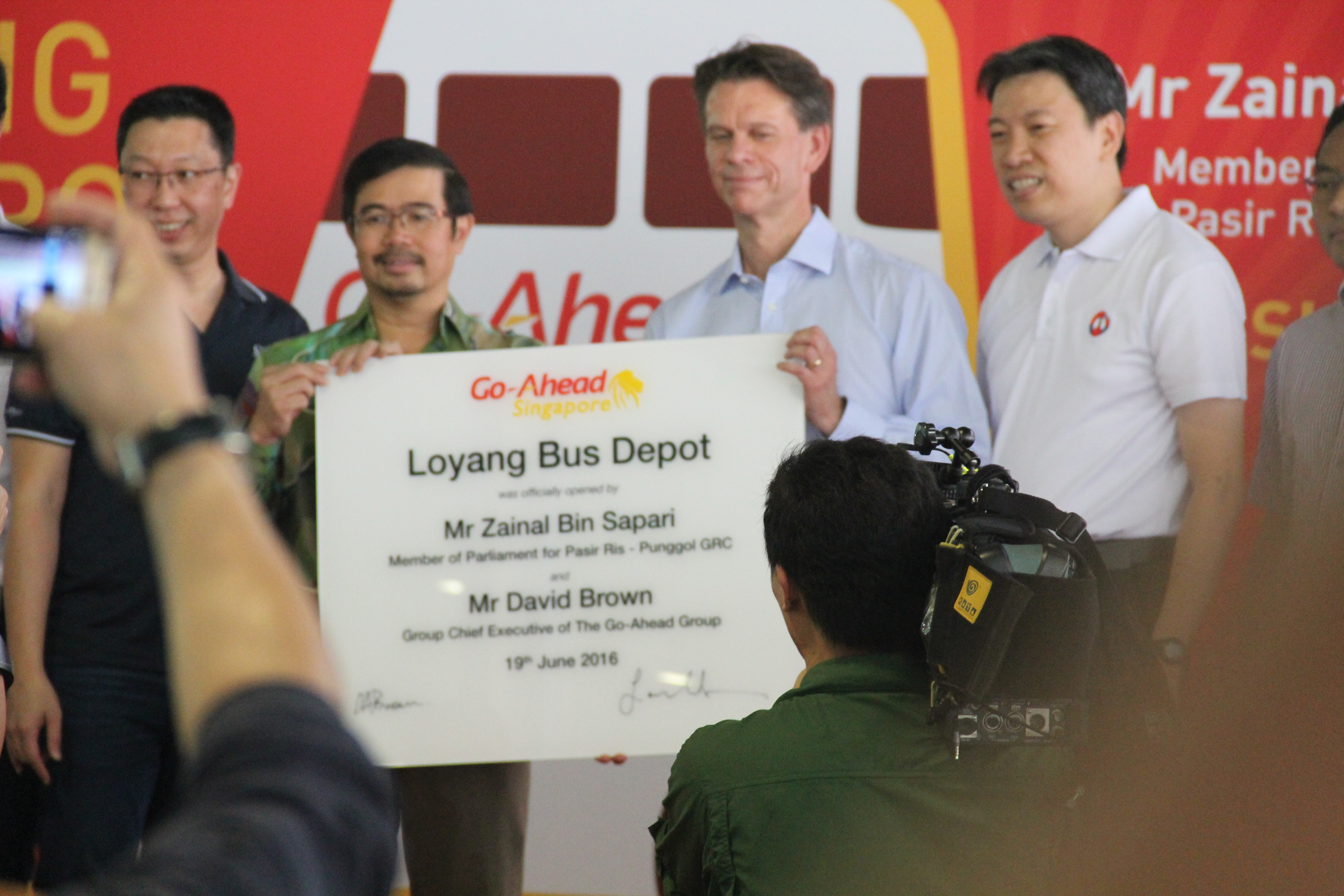
Zainal Sapari, Member of Parliament for Pasir Ris-Punggol Group Representation Constituency and David Brown, Group Chief Executive of the Go-Ahead Group with the signed the commemorative plaque

On 15 April 2015, the Land Transport Authority called for tenders to operate 25 routes based at Changi Airport Bus Terminal, Changi Village Bus Terminal, Pasir Ris Bus Interchange, and Punggol Bus Interchange out of Loyang Bus Depot as part of its new Bus Contracting Model. Busways, Go-Ahead Group, Keolis, RATP Dev Transdev Asia, SBS Transit, SMRT Buses, Tian Tan Shipping/Kumho Buslines and Woodlands Transport lodged bids.

On 23 November 2015, the Land Transport Authority awarded Go-Ahead Singapore the contract with operations to commence in September 2016. The contract will run for five years with a two years extension if it meets LTA's requirements. On 11 December 2015, the Land Transport Authority handed over Loyang Bus Depot to Go-Ahead Singapore to allow it to be fitted out. On 19 June 2016, the Loyang Bus Depot was officially opened by MP for Pasir Ris-Punggol Group Representation Constituency, Zainal Sapari and the group chief executive of the Go-Ahead Group David Brown. Loyang Bus Depot Carnival was also held on the same day to allow the public to tour the depot and also learn more about Go-Ahead Singapore.

Go-Ahead Singapore commenced its operations on 4 September 2016, and took over services from SBS Transit that day and also on 18 September. On 21 September, Go-Ahead Singapore found itself short of staff less than three weeks after launching its services. A total of 30 SBS Transit drivers were deployed at Loyang Bus Depot to operate services 358 and 359, while SMRT Buses sent 10 drivers to help the new public bus operator operate service 85. Tower Transit Singapore was also engaged to supply a staff bus service for Go-Ahead employees at Loyang Bus Depot. On 30 November that year, Go-Ahead Singapore's managing director Nigel Wood left due to "personal reasons". He has since resumed his position with Go-Ahead London as its general manager.

On 19 September 2025, LTA announced that Go-Ahead Singapore had won the bid to operate 27 bus services under the Tampines Bus Package starting from 5 July 2026.

== Bus routes ==
Go-Ahead Singapore commenced operations of 24 bus services in 2 handover phases. 13 bus services in Punggol commenced services on 4 September 2016, while another 11 more bus services in Pasir Ris has started on 18th of that month. All bus services were previously operated by SBS Transit. Expansion therefore followed after the handover, but Go-Ahead Singapore only allows trunk, feeder, Express and City Direct bus services. Go-Ahead Singapore did not takeover NiteOwl 4N, NiteOwl 6N and NightRider NR7 from SBS Transit and SMRT Buses which were eventually withdrawn.

Date	Service(s)	Operating Hours / Notes
12 March 2017	381	Expansion of Punggol
28 January 2018	12e	Weekday one-directional service (6am-12pm and 4pm-10pm) and weekend two-directional service (8am-6pm and 1.30pm-10pm)
1 April 2018	68	Expansion of Tampines North
2 January 2019	661	Peak Hours only
9 September 2019	43e	Peak Hours only
2 March 2020	666	Peak Hours only
27 December 2020	384	Expansion of Punggol
14 October 2024	673	Peak Hours only
2 January 2025	678	Peak Hours only
26 October 2025	104	Expansion of Punggol; Replacement of 43M
10 November 2025	44	Weekday one-directional service (630am - 830am, 515pm - 715pm)
15 December 2025	683	Peak Hours only
27 April 2026	459	Peak Hours only
5 July 2026	10, 10e, 18, 20, 31, 39, 65, 129, 292, 293, 298, 299, 454, 646	Expansion of operations with Tampines Package; Takeover from SBS Transit
19 July 2026	4, 19, 23, 28, 29, 37, 38, 47, 69, 72, 81, 127, 291, 296, 460	Expansion of operations with Tampines Package; Takeover from SBS Transit

== Bus fleet ==
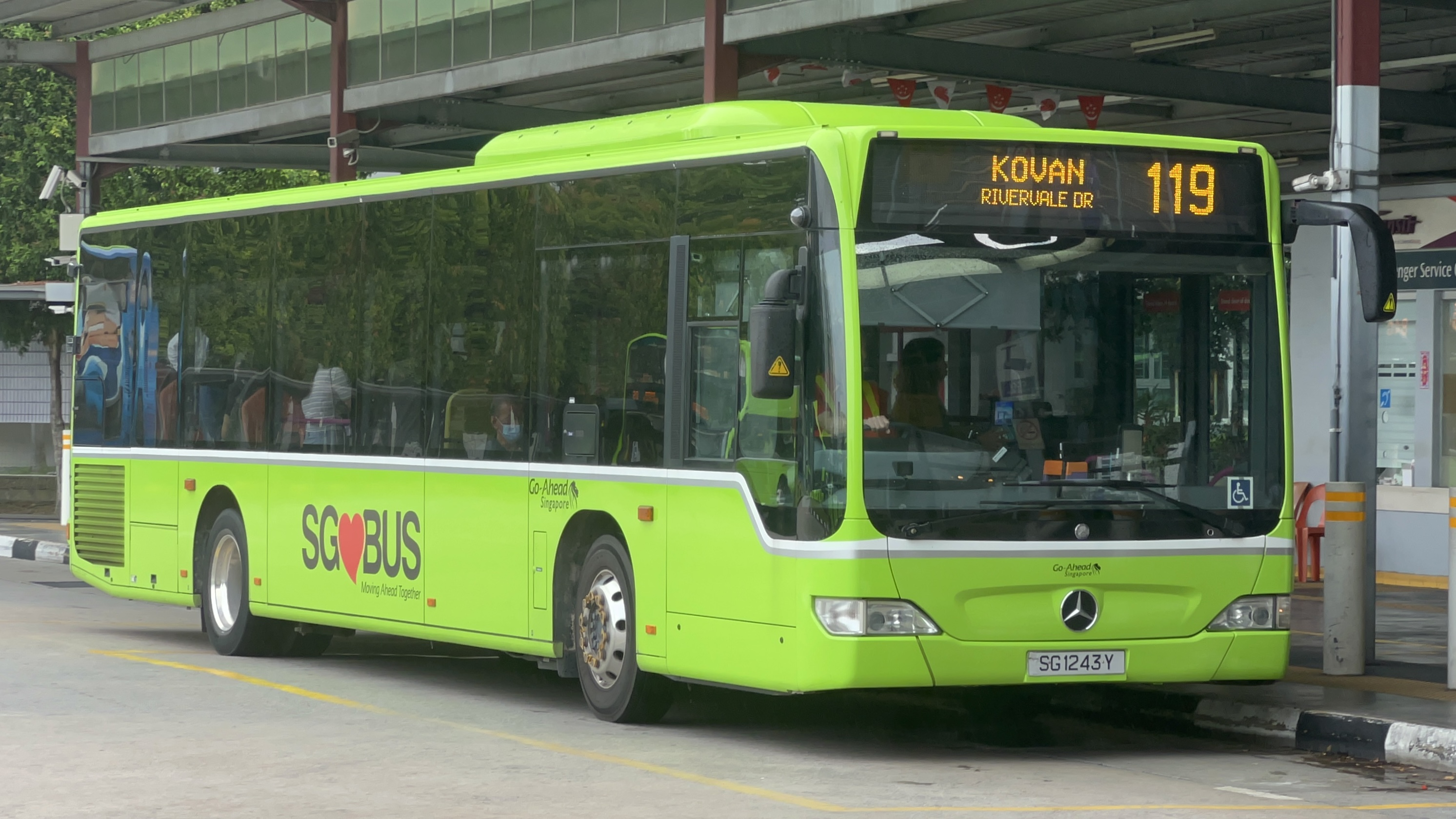
A Mercedes Benz Citaro on service 119 operated by Go-Ahead Singapore

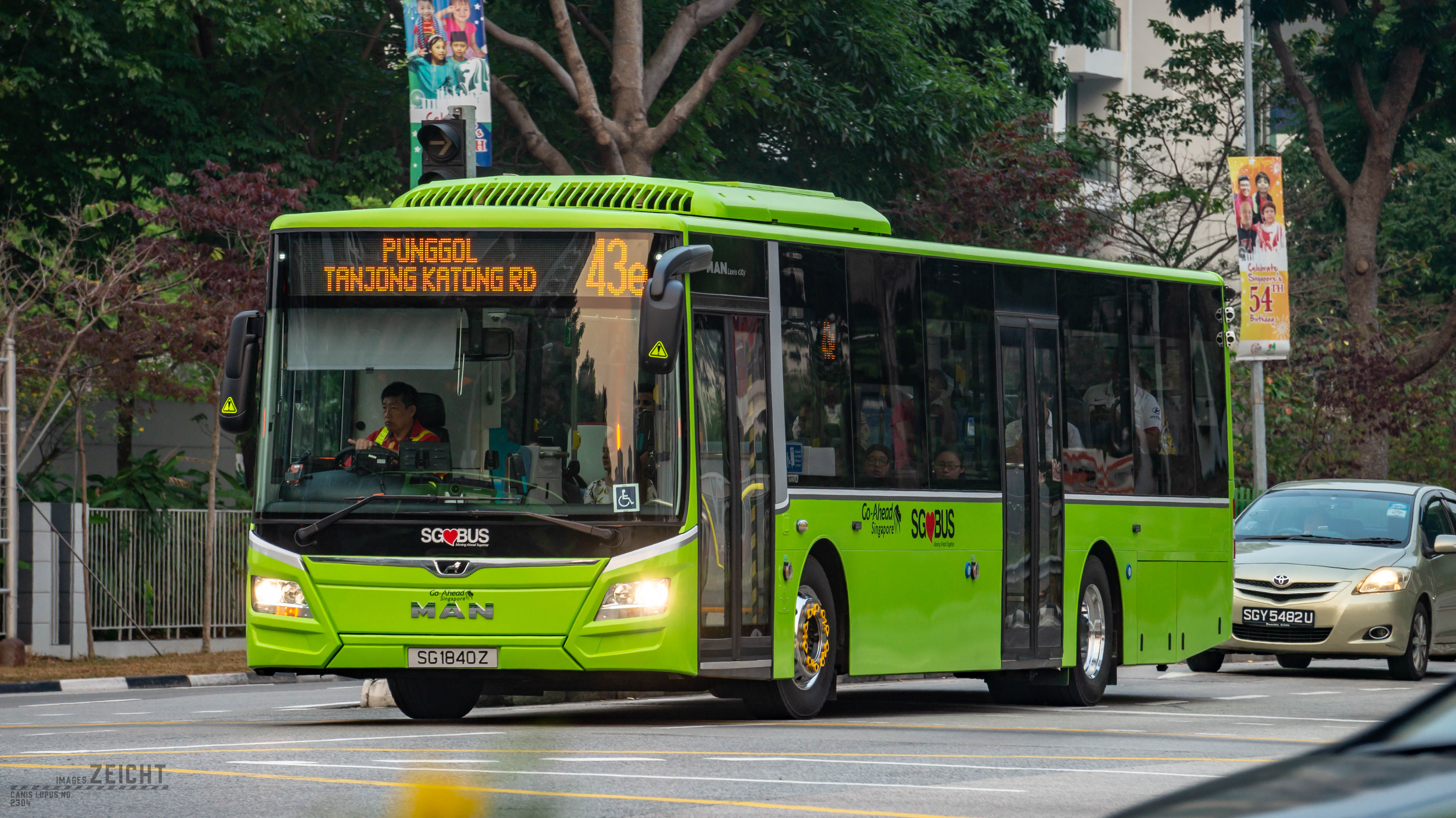
A MAN A22 of Go-Ahead Singapore

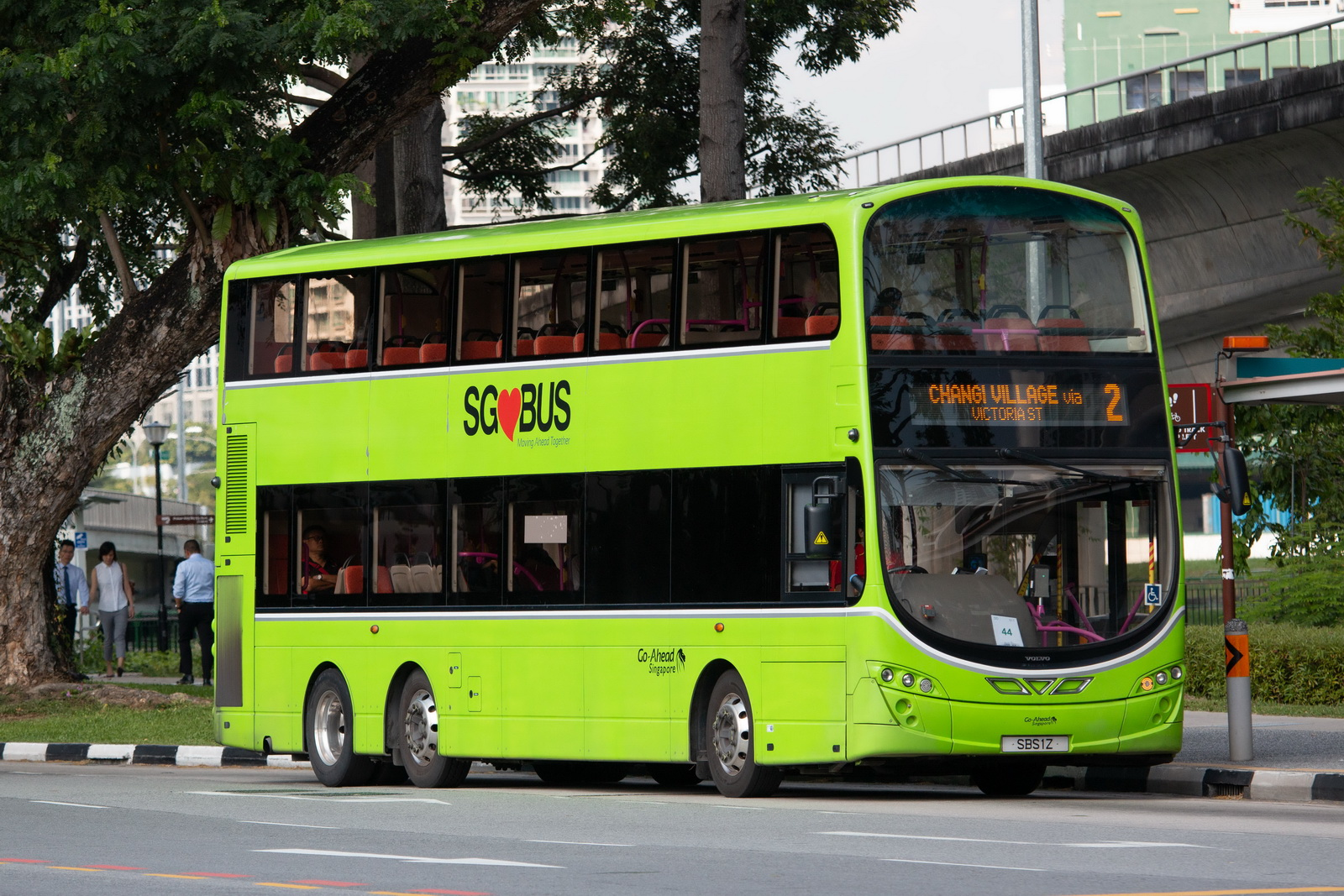
A Go-Ahead Singapore Volvo B9TL with Wright Eclipse Gemini 2 bodywork

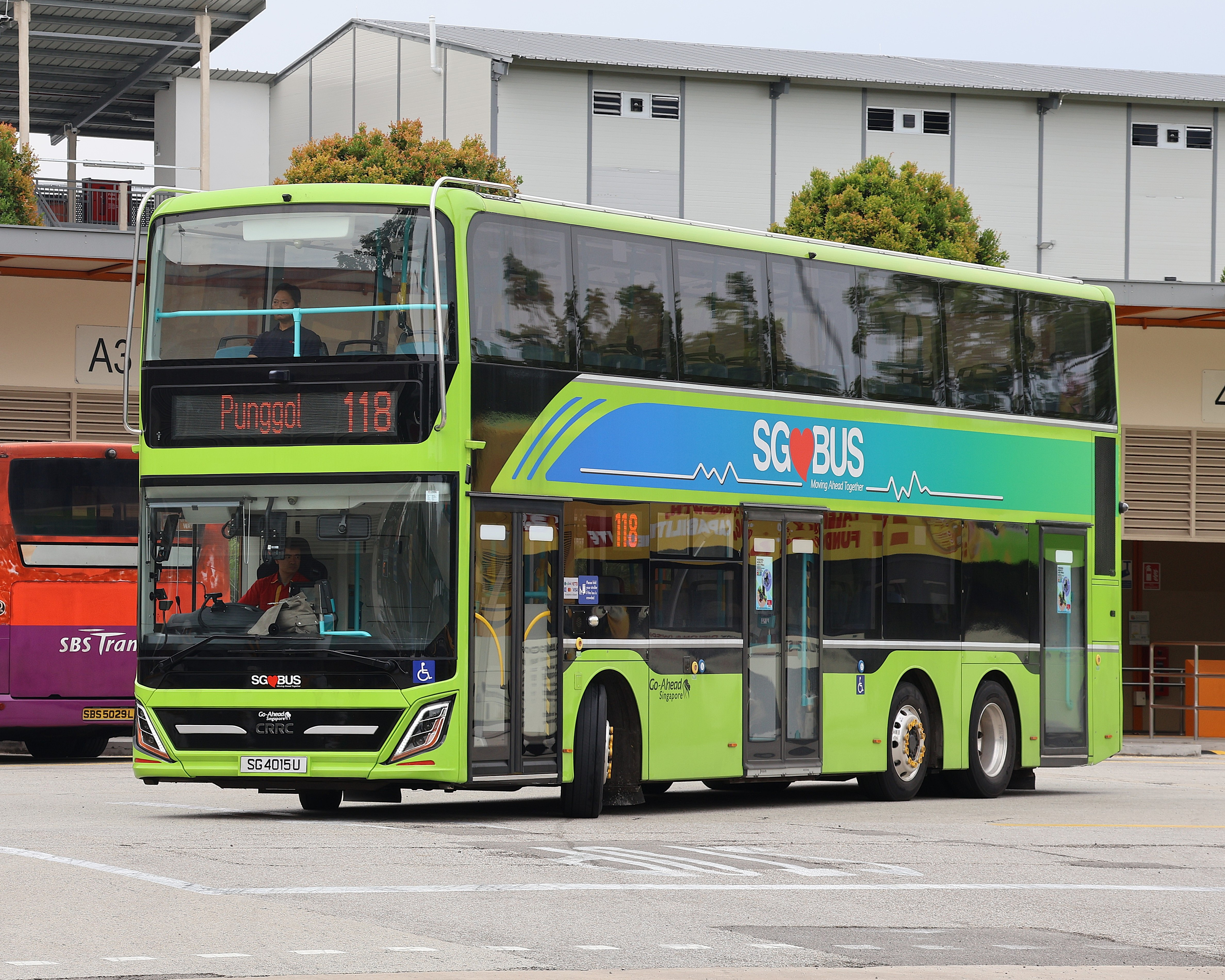
A CRRC CSR6120GLEVD2 with Gemilang Coachworks bodywork

When Go-Ahead Singapore started operations in 2016, it inherited a variety of buses previously operated by incumbent operator SBS Transit.

=== Single decker buses ===
- Mercedes-Benz O530 Citaro (Daimler Buses)
- MAN NL323F Lion's City (A22) (Gemilang Coachworks)
- Yutong ZK6128BEVG E12
- BYD GTK6127BEVB (BC12A04)
- Zhongtong LCK6126EVG N12 (Production unit)
- Volvo B5L Hybrid (MCV Evora)

=== Double decker buses ===
- Volvo B9TL (Wright Eclipse Gemini 2)
- MAN ND323F Lion's City (A95) (Gemilang Coachworks)
- Yutong ZK6125BEVGS E12DD
- Alexander Dennis Enviro500 MMC (3-door variant)

=== Formerly operated ===
- BYD K9 Integral (SG4001J)
- CRRC C12 (SG4006X)
- Zhongtong LCK6126EVG N12 LTA trial specifications demonstrator (SG4010H)
- FTBCI FBC6120BRS7 (SG4012C)
- CRRC CSR6120GLBEV02 (SG4015U) (Gemilang Coachworks)
