= Zhongtong Bus =

Chinese bus manufacturer

Zhongtong Bus Holding Co., Ltd. 中通客车
- Industry: Automotive
- Founded: 1958
- Headquarters: Liaocheng, Shandong, China
- Area served: Worldwide
- Key people: Qingfu Wang (President and CEO)
- Products: Buses
- Services: Chinese service
- Owner: Shandong Heavy Industry
- Number of employees: Approx. 3,000
- Website: www.zhongtongbuses.com

Zhongtong Bus Holding Co., Ltd. (SZSE: 000957) (Chinese: 中通客车; pinyin: Zhōngtōng Kèchē; Wade–Giles: Chung^{1}-tʻung^{1} Kʻo^{4}-chê^{1}) is a Chinese bus manufacturing company based in Liaocheng, Shandong Province. The company is listed on the Shenzhen Stock Exchange, and is one of China's major bus makers.

== History ==
The company was founded in 1958 as Liaocheng Vehicle Manufacturing and Repair Factory, and began building buses in 1971. After a series of name changes, the company adopted its current name, Zhongtong Bus, in 1998. In 2000, Zhongtong and the Netherlands VDL Bova signed a technology transfer agreement to produce Zhongtong Bofa series buses.

The company was previously owned by the state-owned Shandong Communications Industry Group. In August 2018, Shandong Communications Industry Group was acquired by Shandong Heavy Industry Group, and Zhongtong Bus became a subsidiary of Shandong Heavy Industry Group.

== Products ==
Zhongtong Bus' products range from 6-meter light buses to 18-meter high-end luxury buses, including road, urban, light, and hybrid electric buses. It now also makes trolleybuses, and in 2021 provided a prototype model LCK6126E trolleybus to Mexico City's Servicio de Transportes Eléctricos (on loan).

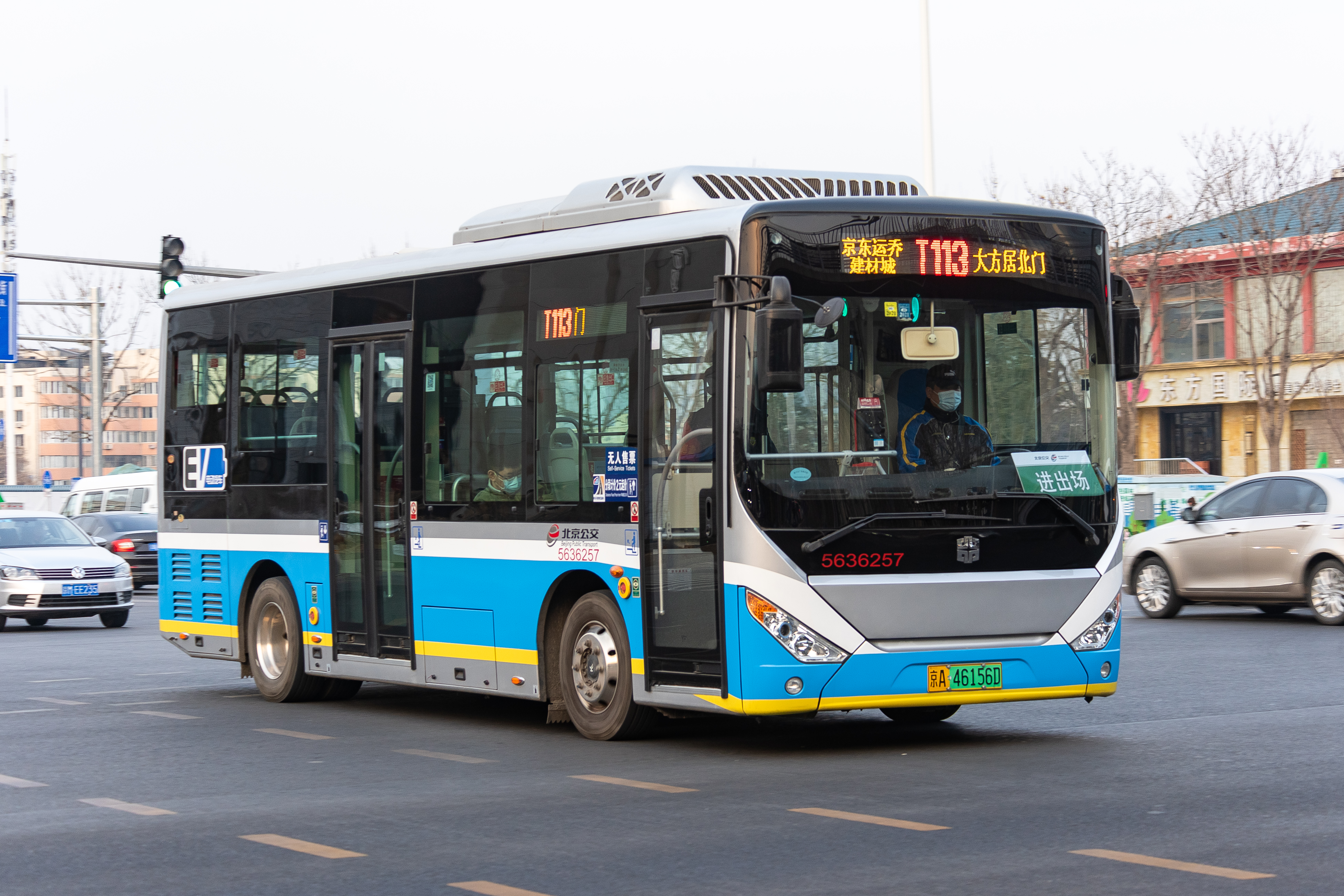
A Zhongtong LCK6850EVG3M1 in Beijing

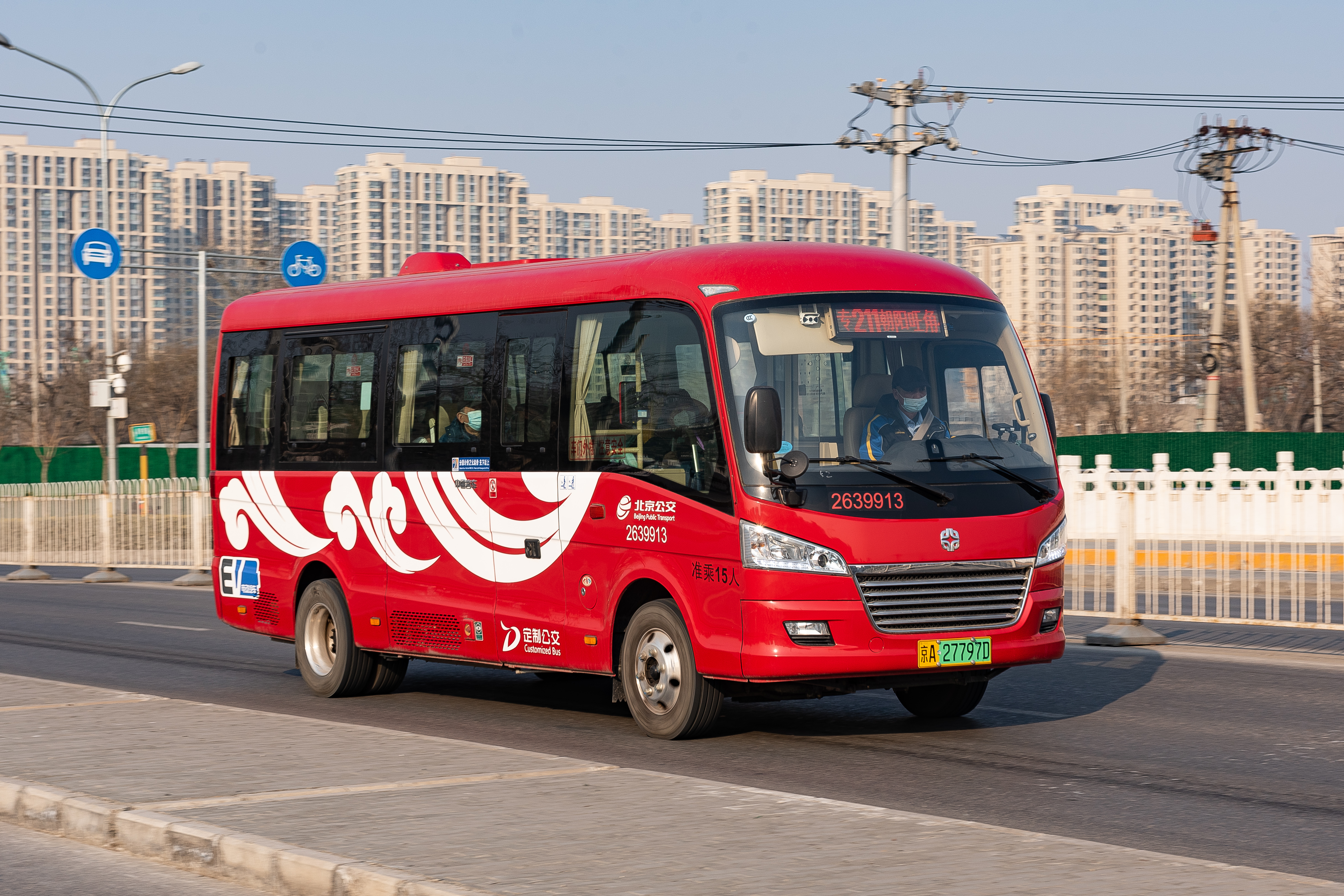
A Zhongtong LCK6720EVGA

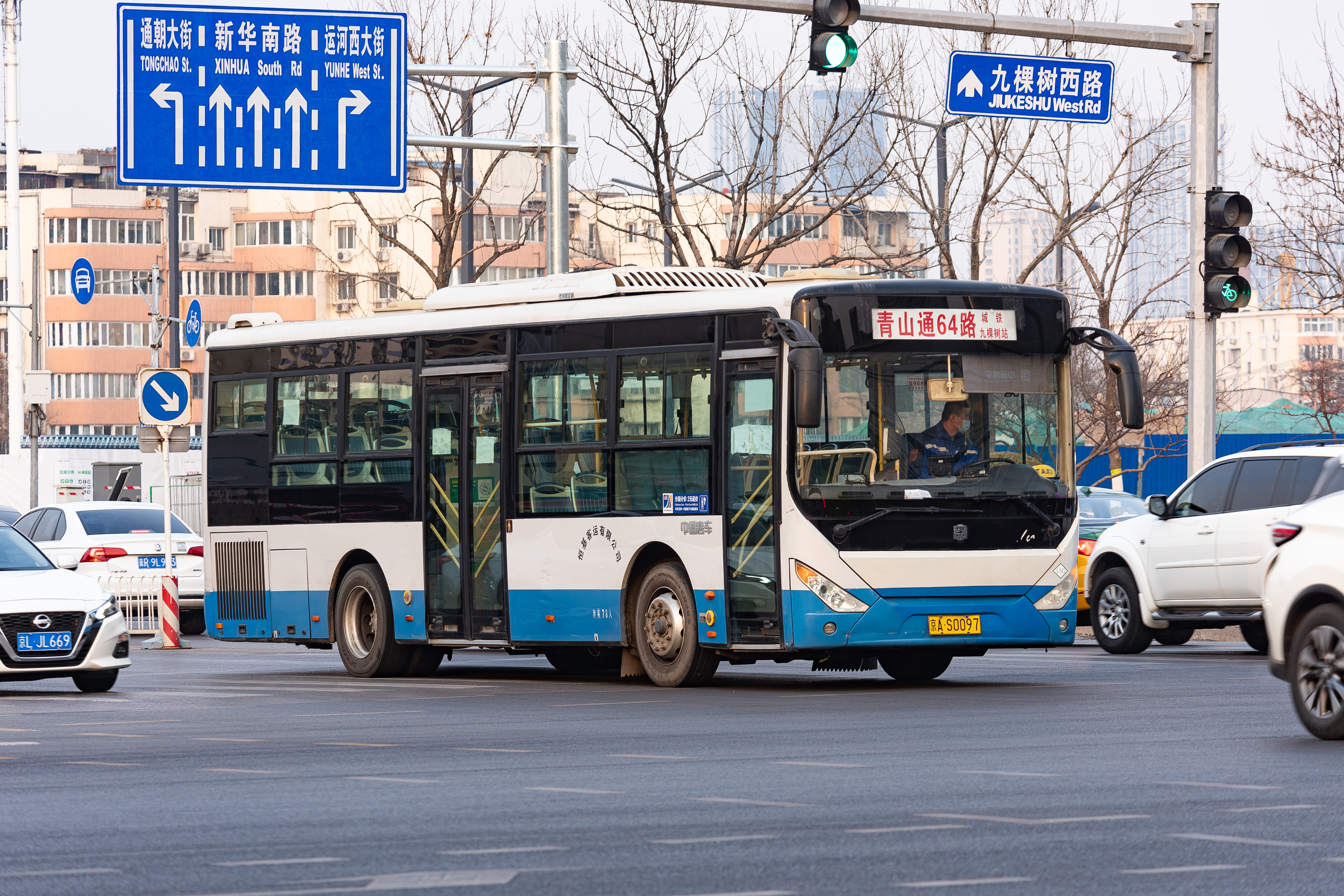
A Zhongtong LCK6108 series in Tongzhou District, Beijing

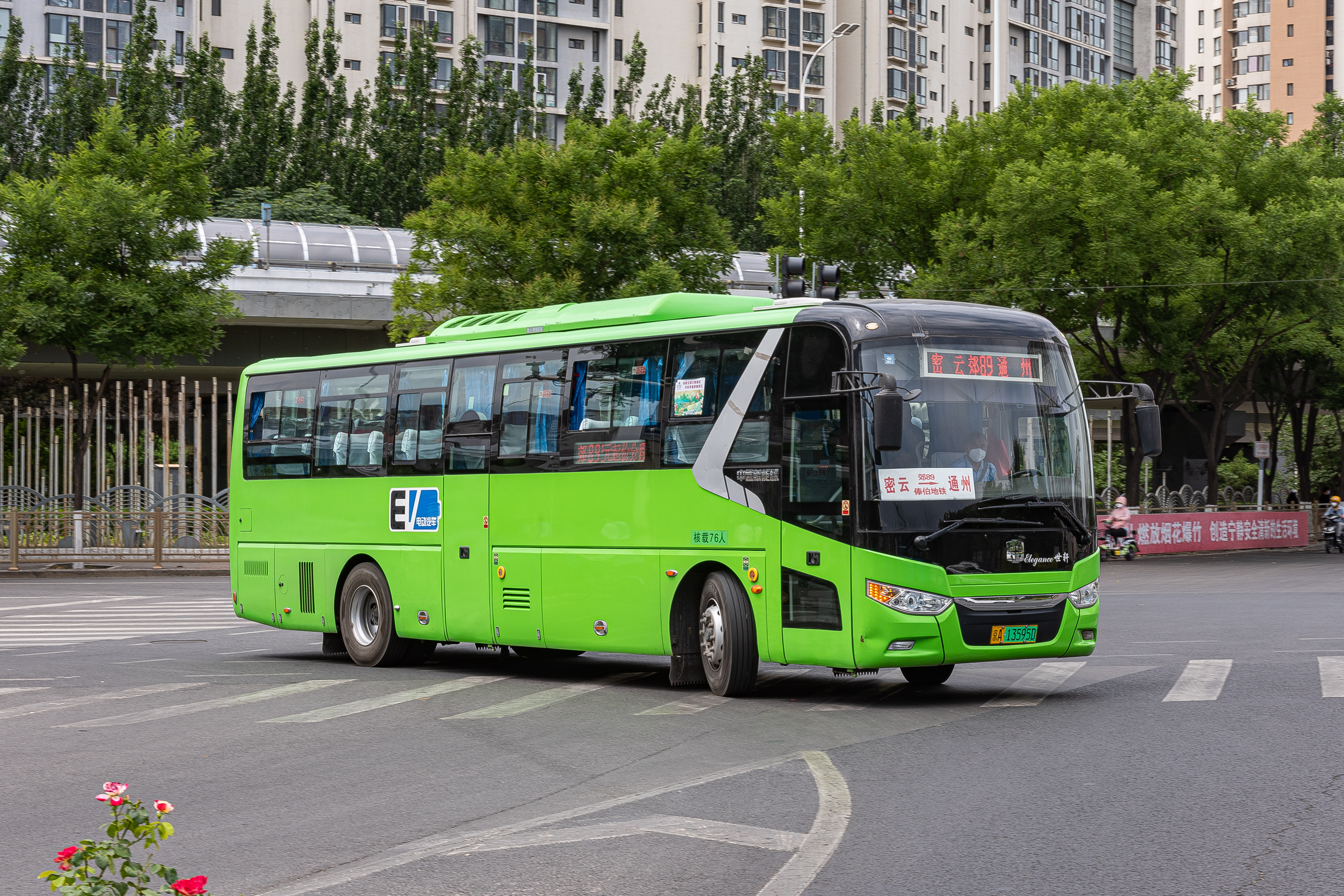
A Zhongtong LCK6117EVGA "Elegance" in Tongzhou District, Beijing

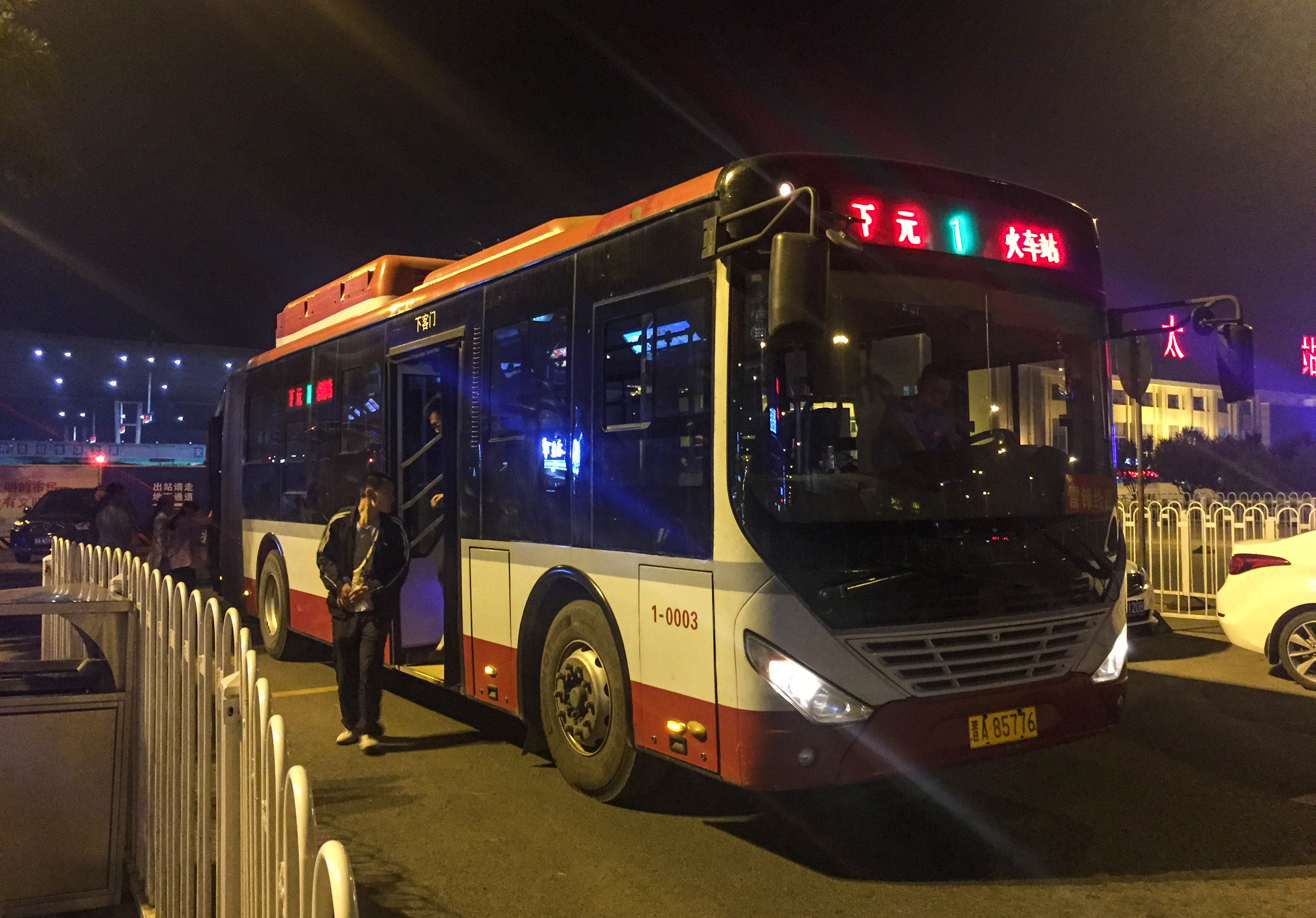
A Zhongtong LCK6180DGCA in Taiyuan

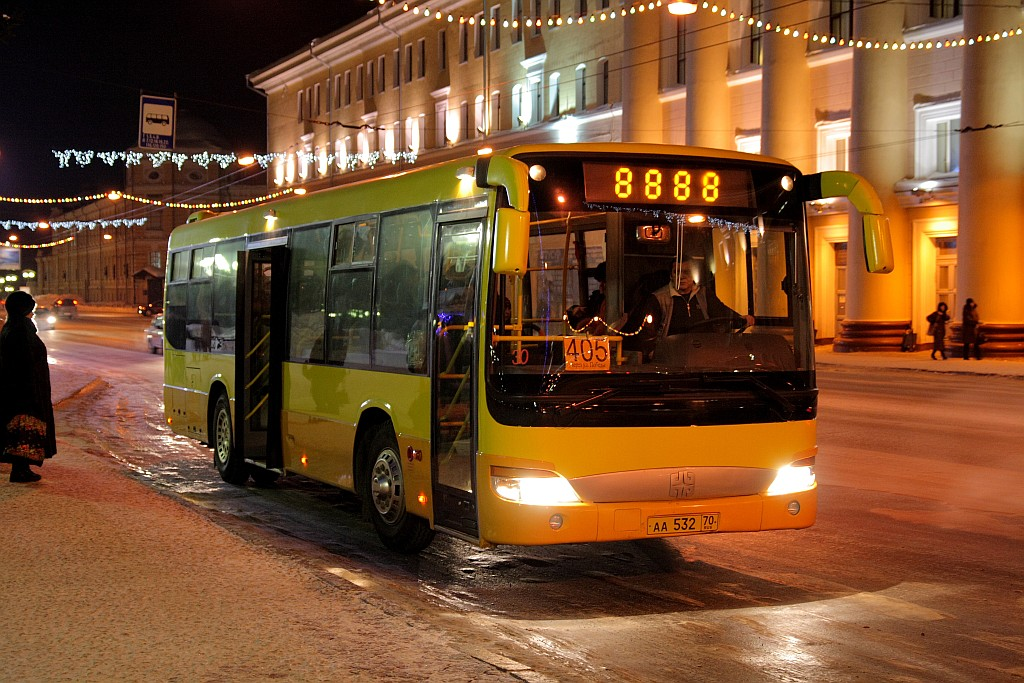
A Zhongtong LCK6103G

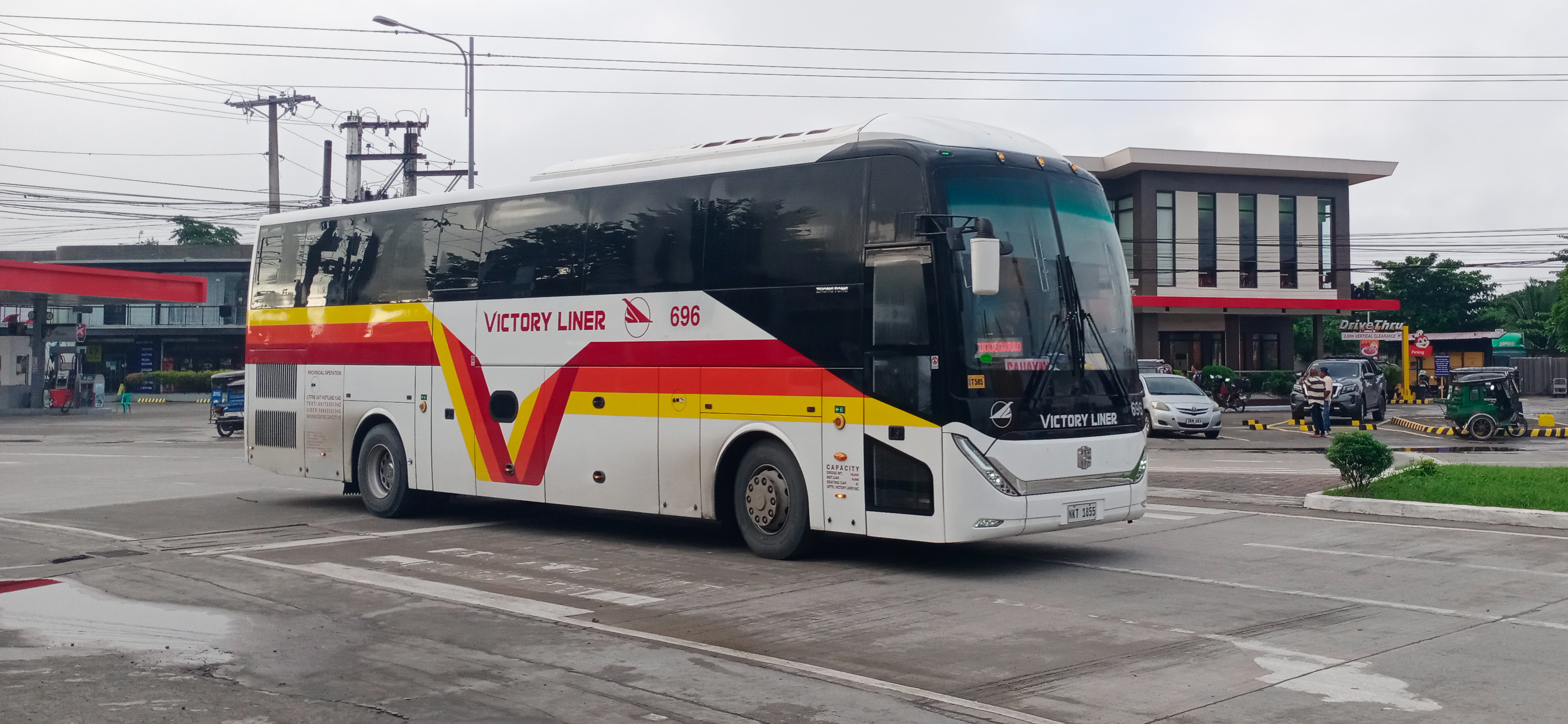
A Victory Liner Zhongtong LCK6129H

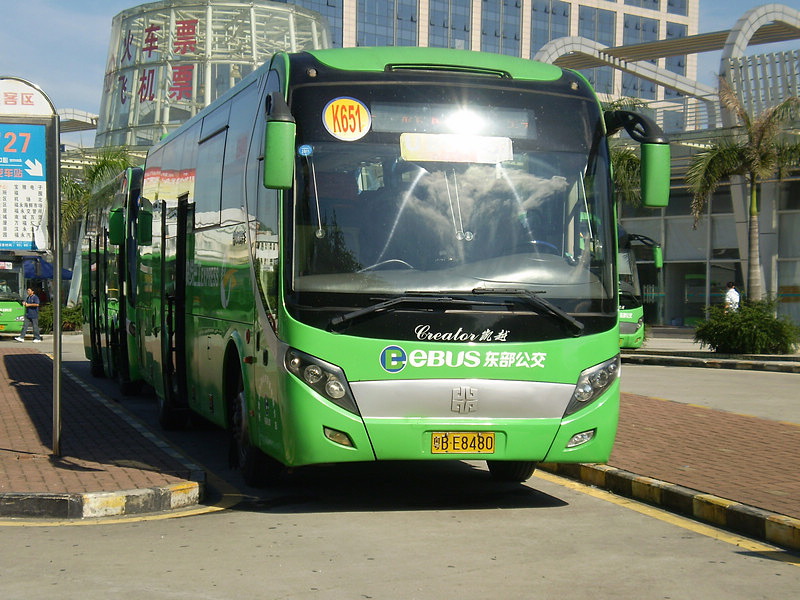
A Zhongtong bus in service in Shenzhen

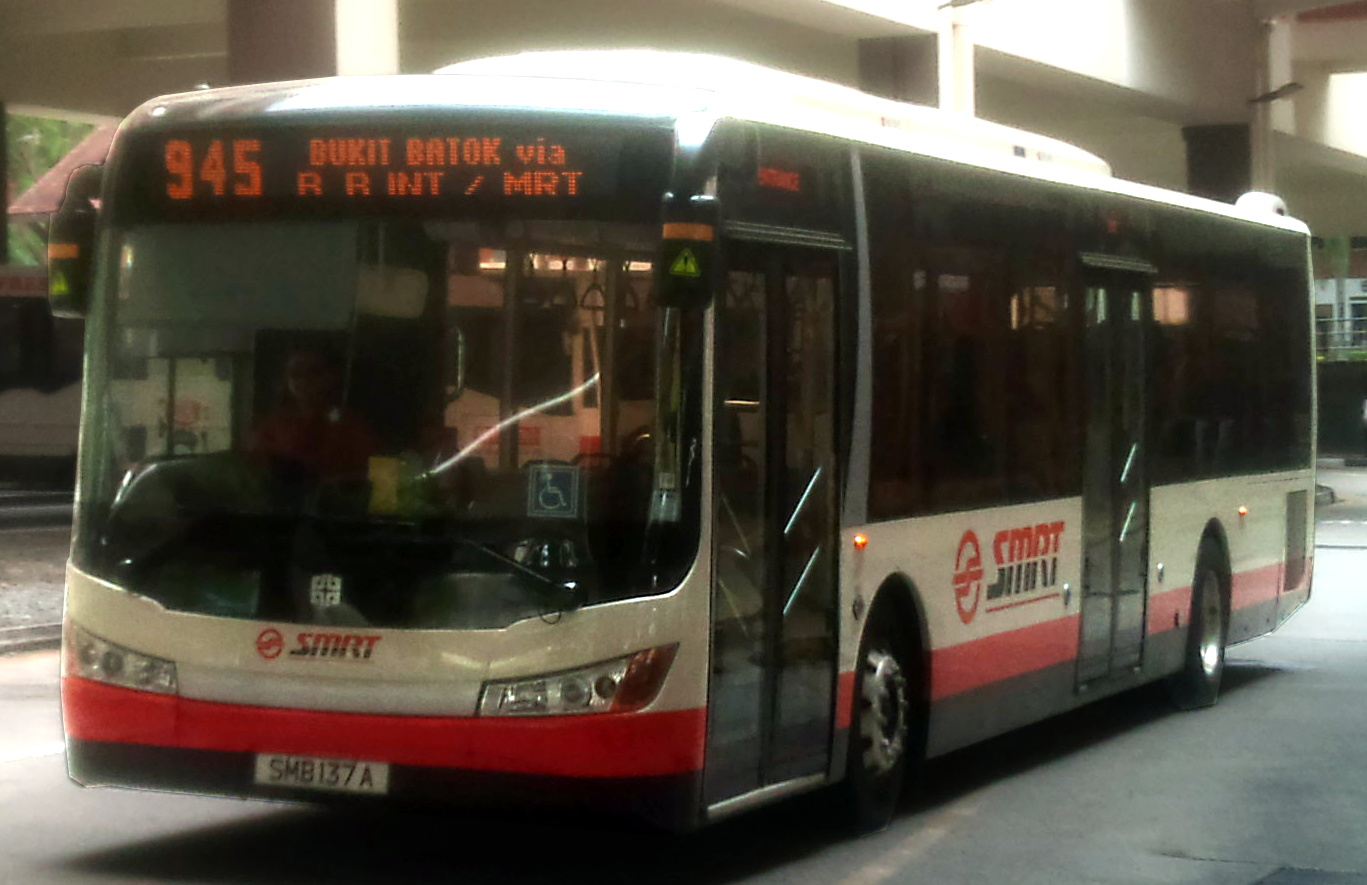
A SMRT Buses Zhongtong LCK6121GHEV demonstrator in Singapore

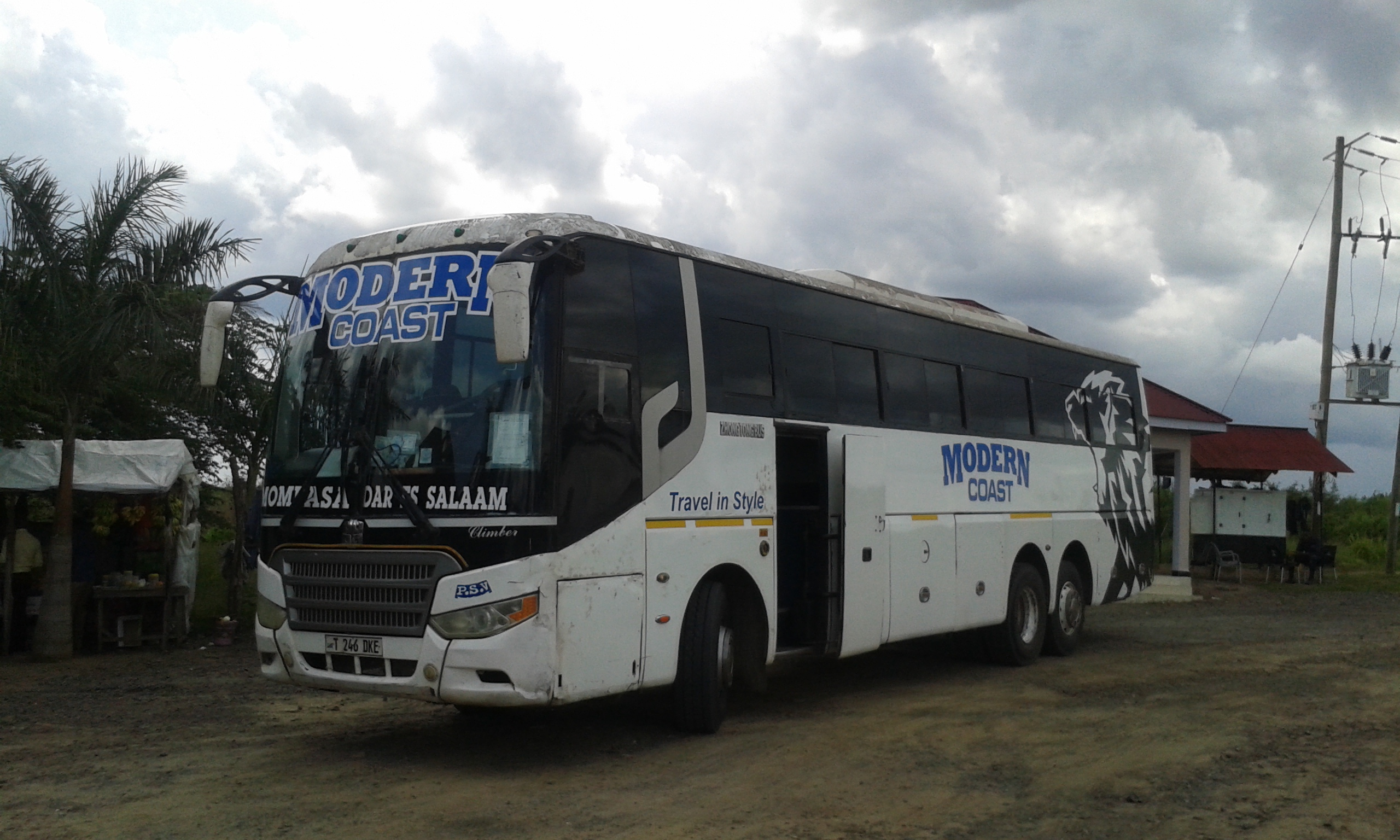
A Zhongtong bus in Tanzania

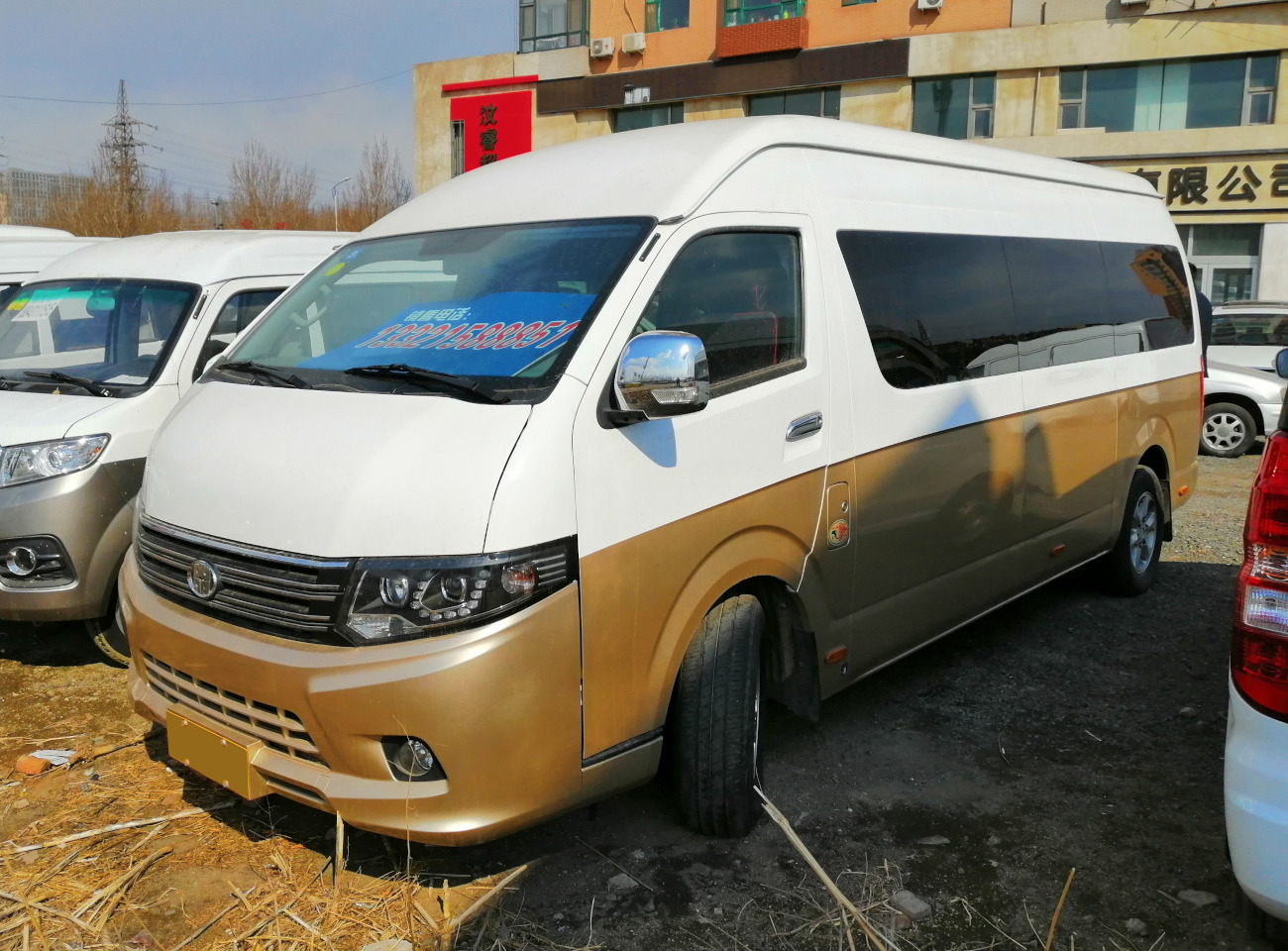
A Zhongtong LCK6600BEV5 (possibly unlicensed clone of Toyota HiAce H200 high roof van)

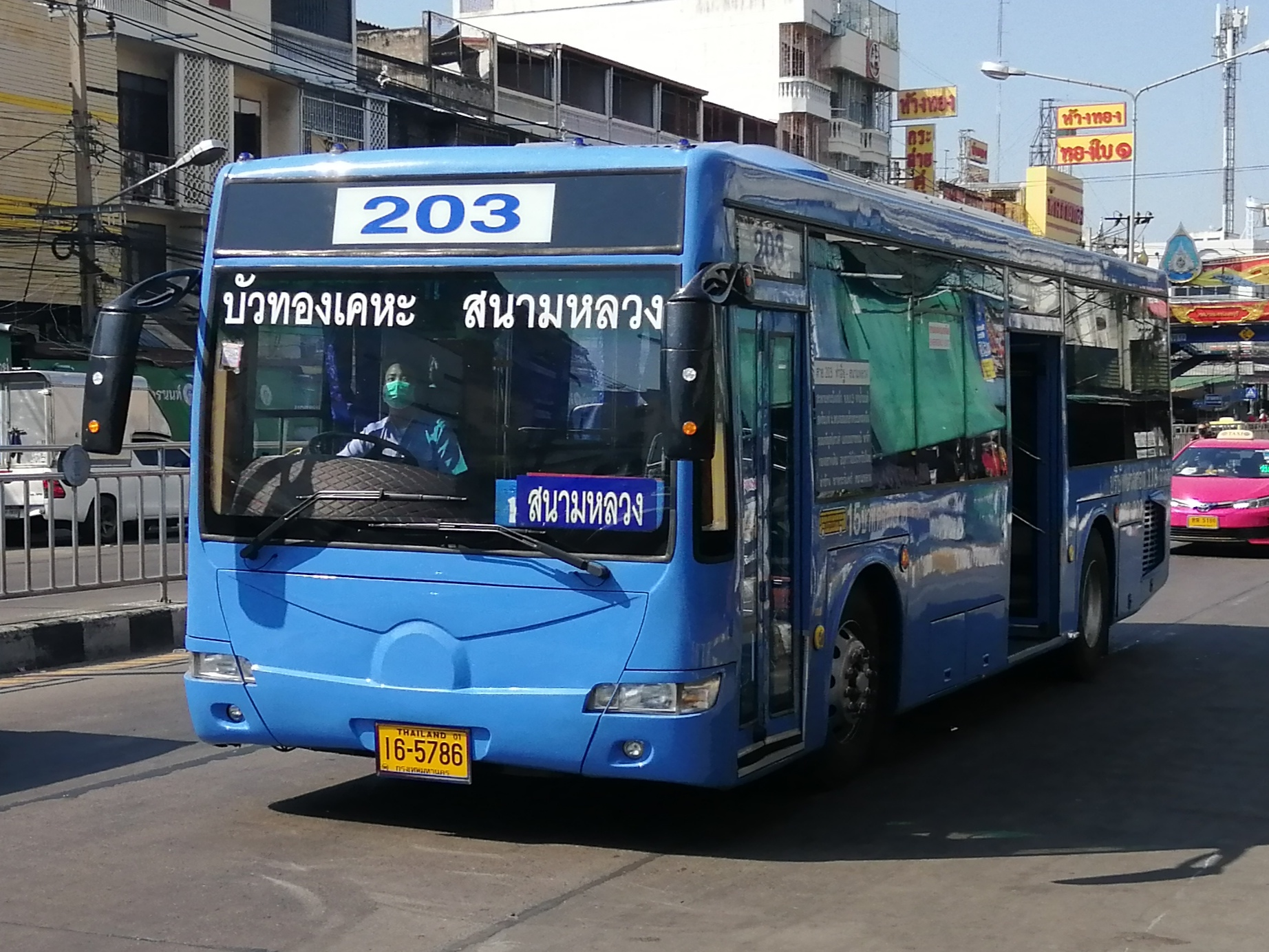
A Zhongtong LCK6910GC (Bangkok 118 CO., LTD.)

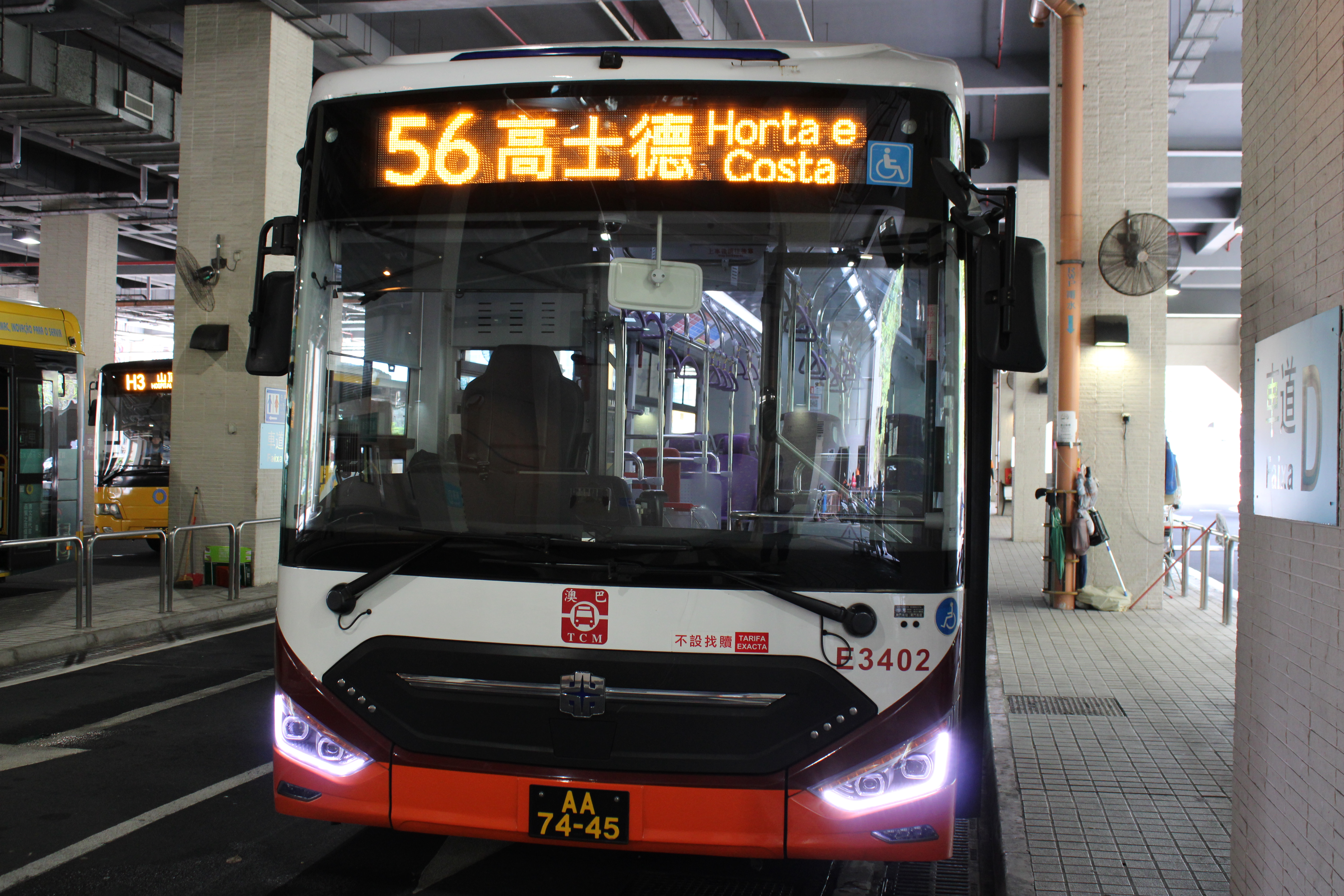
A TCM Zhongtong LCK6113SHEVG in Macau

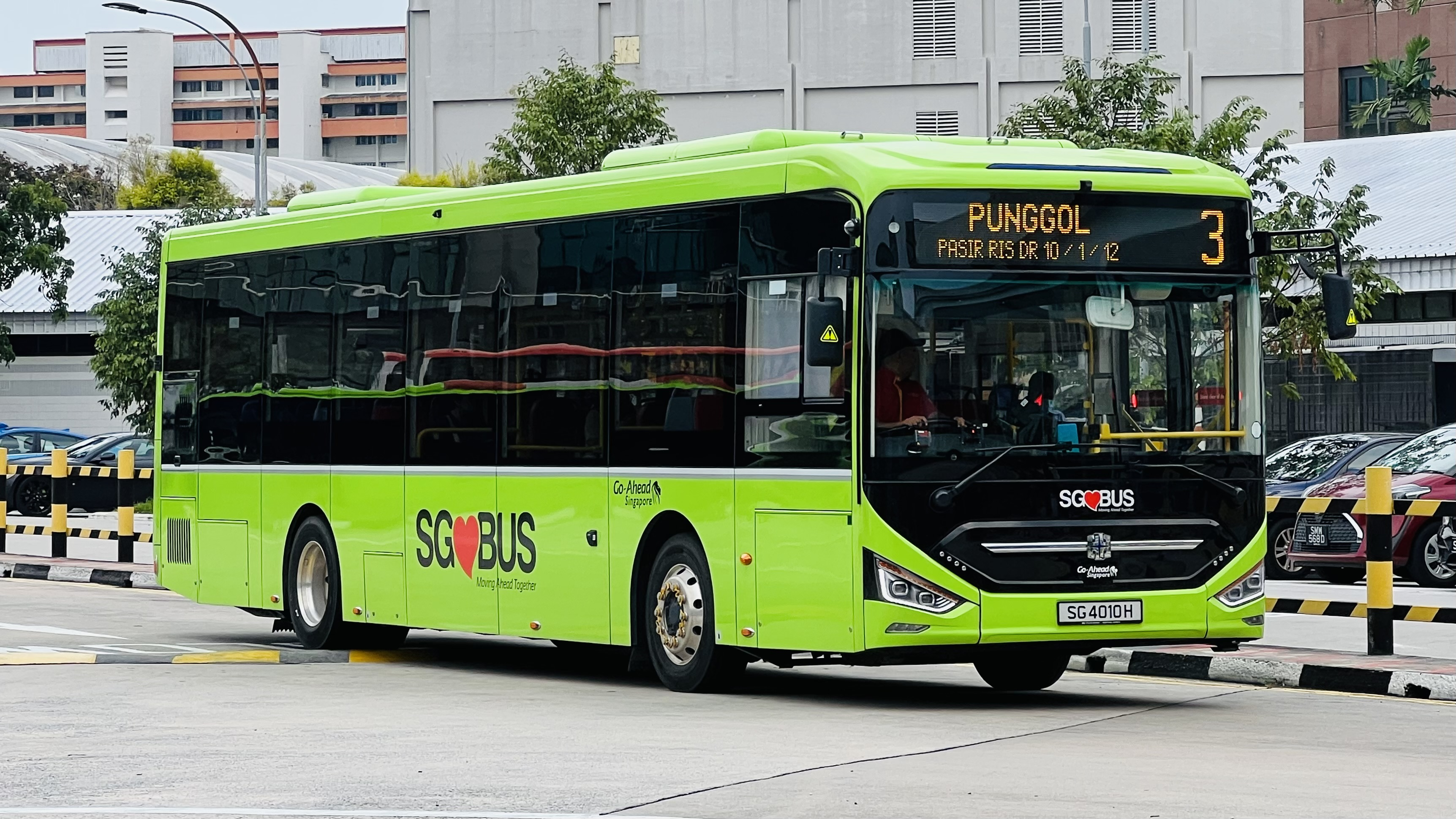
A Go-Ahead Singapore Zhongtong LCK6126EVG N12 demonstrator in Singapore

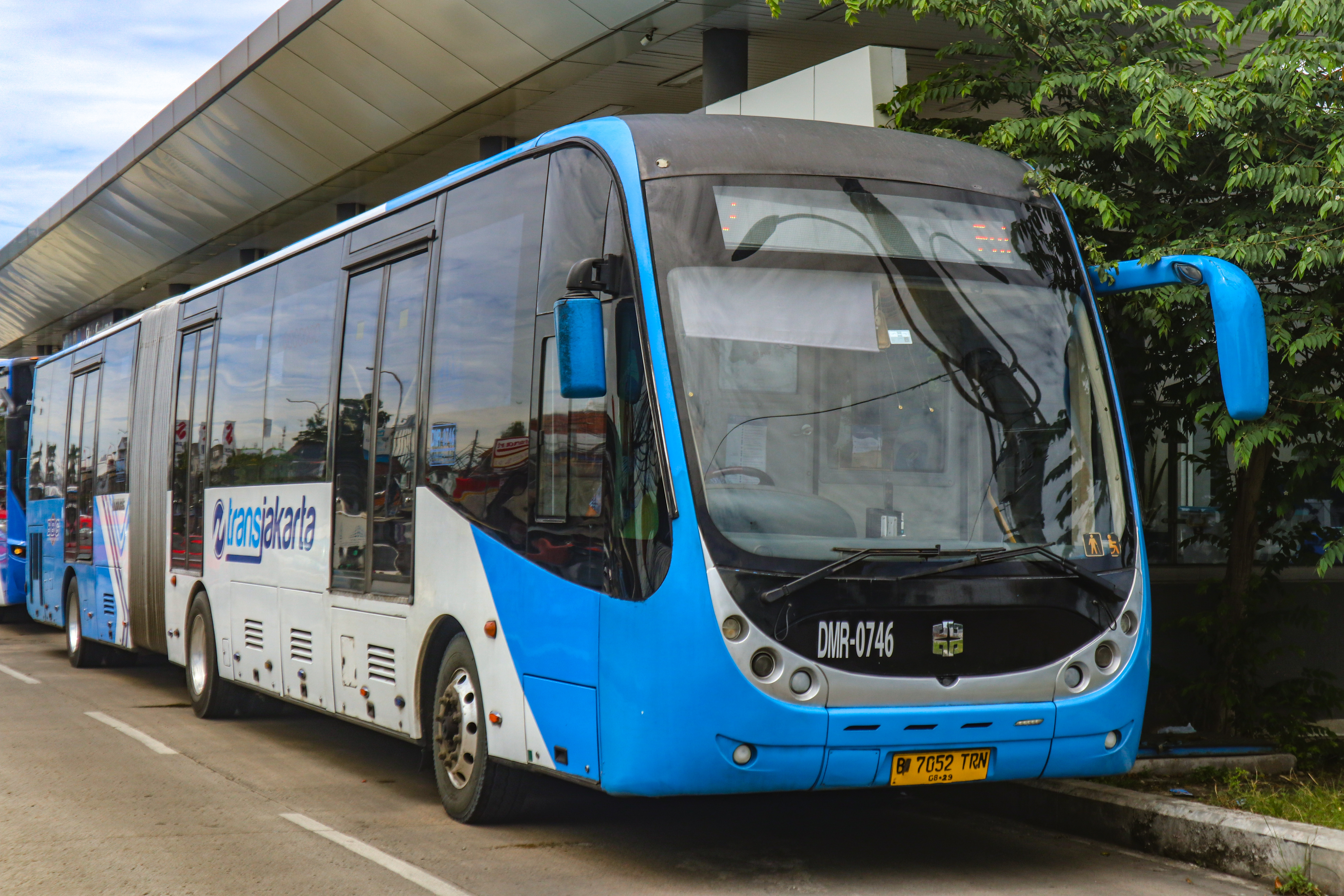
A Transjakarta Zhongtong LCK6180GC in Jakarta (articulated bus)

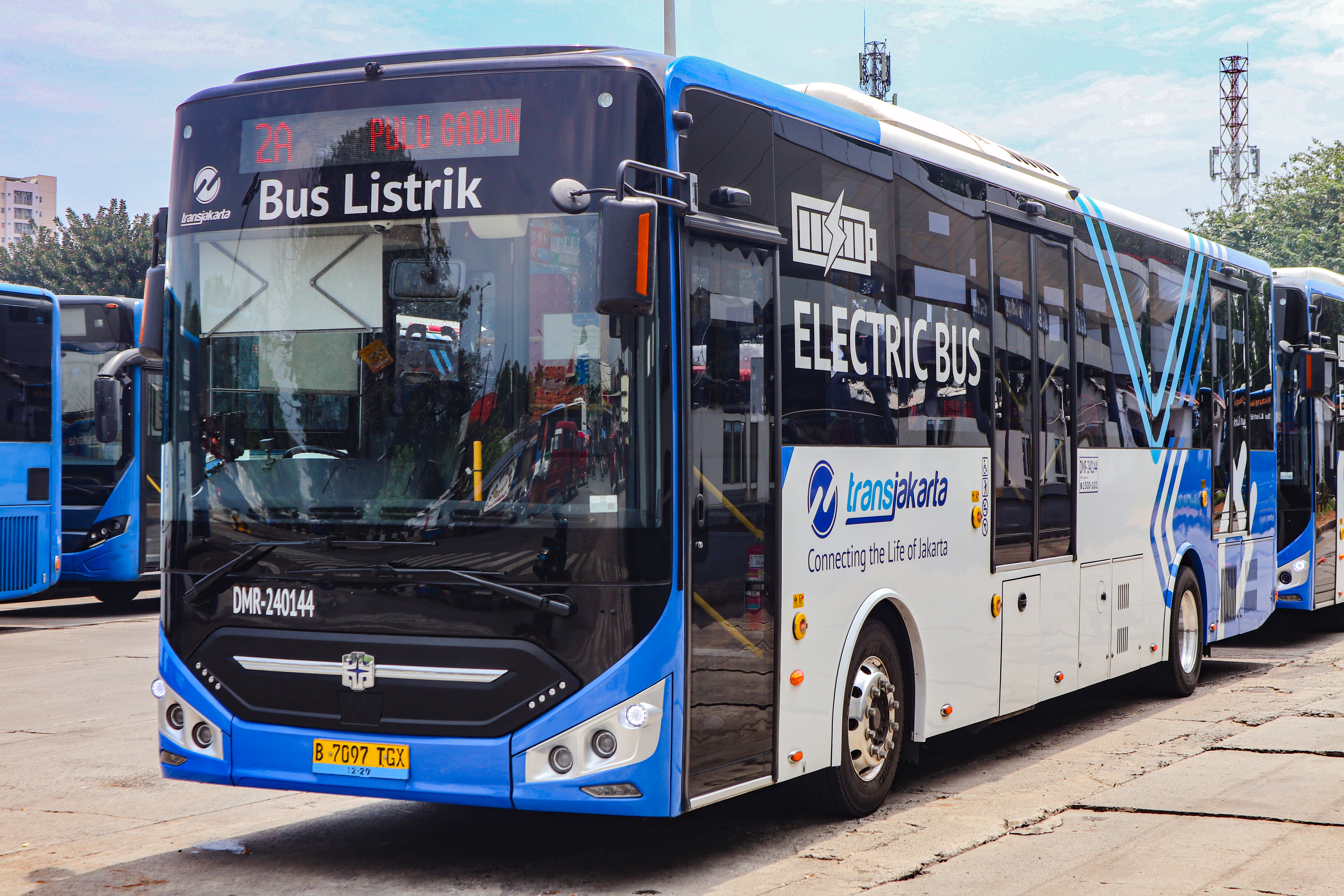
A Transjakarta Zhongtong N12 LCK6126EVGRA1 in Jakarta

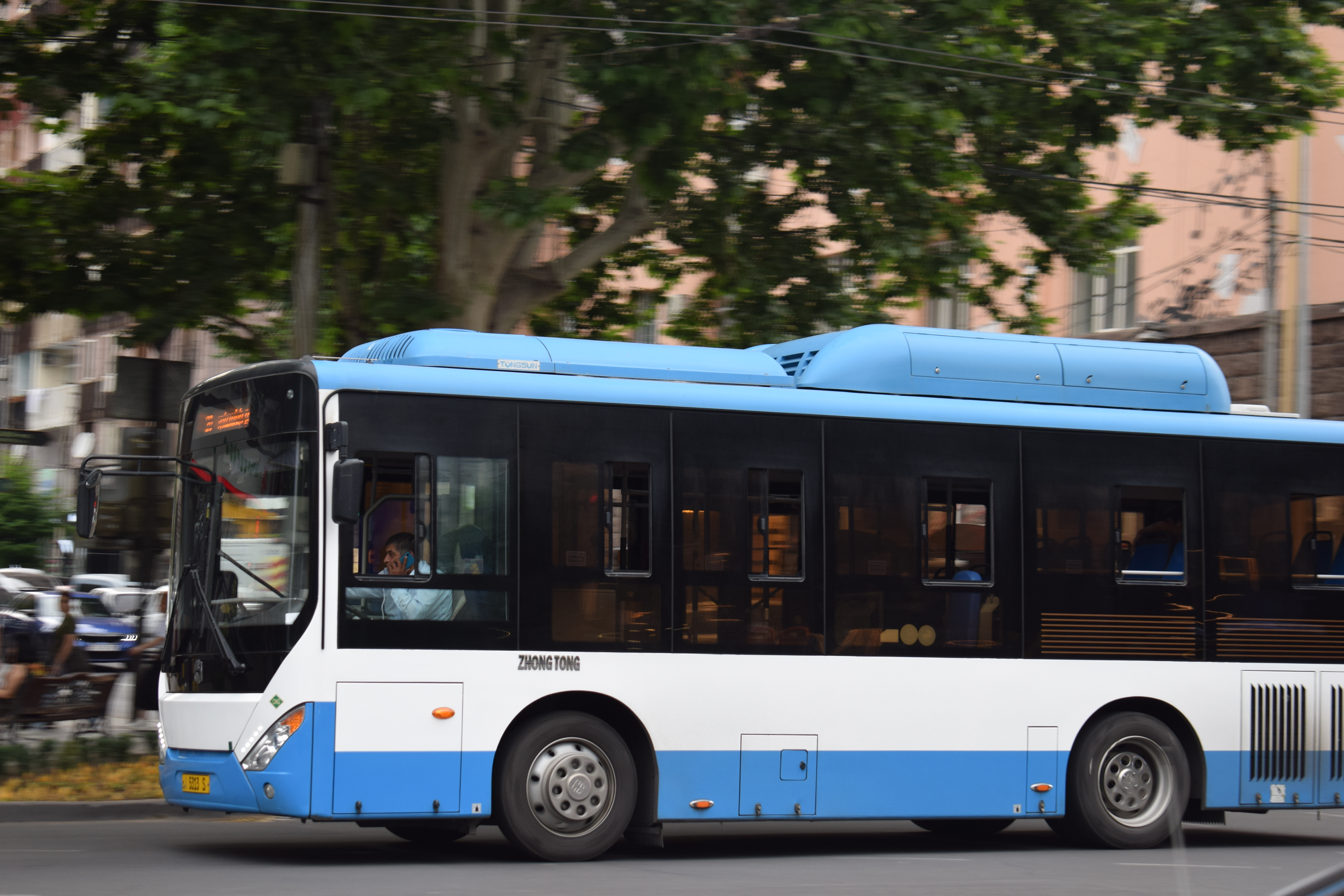
A Zhongtong LCK6860HGN in Yerevan (this model runs on methane)

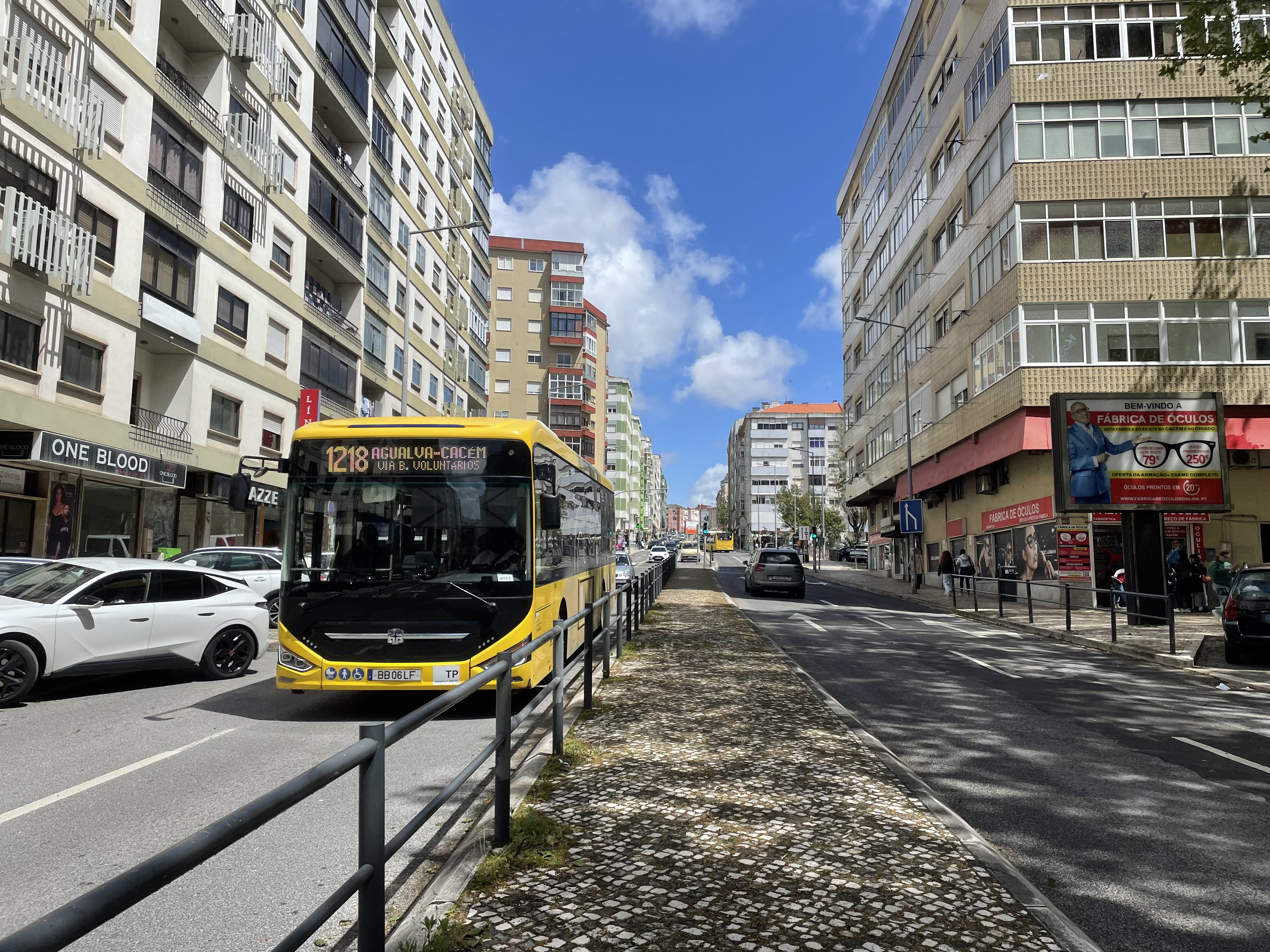
A Zhongtong N12 LCK6126EVG-2 in Lisbon

=== Zhongtong LCK6600BEV Series ===
The Zhongtong LCK6600BEV Series is an unlicensed clone of Toyota HiAce (H200) van, with similar body styles and overall vehicle dimensions, but only offered 3 trims in LCK6600BEV lineup. All trims uses hybrid powertrain.

This vehicle is powered by a hybrid powertrain, uses asynchronous motor and 35kWh battery that had 175 km (91 mi) range and can charge up to 1 hours, and uses 2.5 L 4J25TC TDi Turbo Diesel I4, 2.8 L 4JB1 TDi Turbo Diesel I4 and 2.0 L 4Di Diesel I4 diesel engines, in order to charge battery by using the engine to generate power.

The trims are BEV5, BEV4, BEV6 and BEV5PV trims. Zhongtong also offered as LCK6600BEV4 as only offered in normal roof, short-wheelbase variant. Zhongtong also released as a higher roof long-wheelbase variant called LCK6600BEV6 and panel van LCK6600BEV5PV for commercial use. The vehicle was released in China and Taiwan in 2014, along with a LCK6600BEV Series lineup.

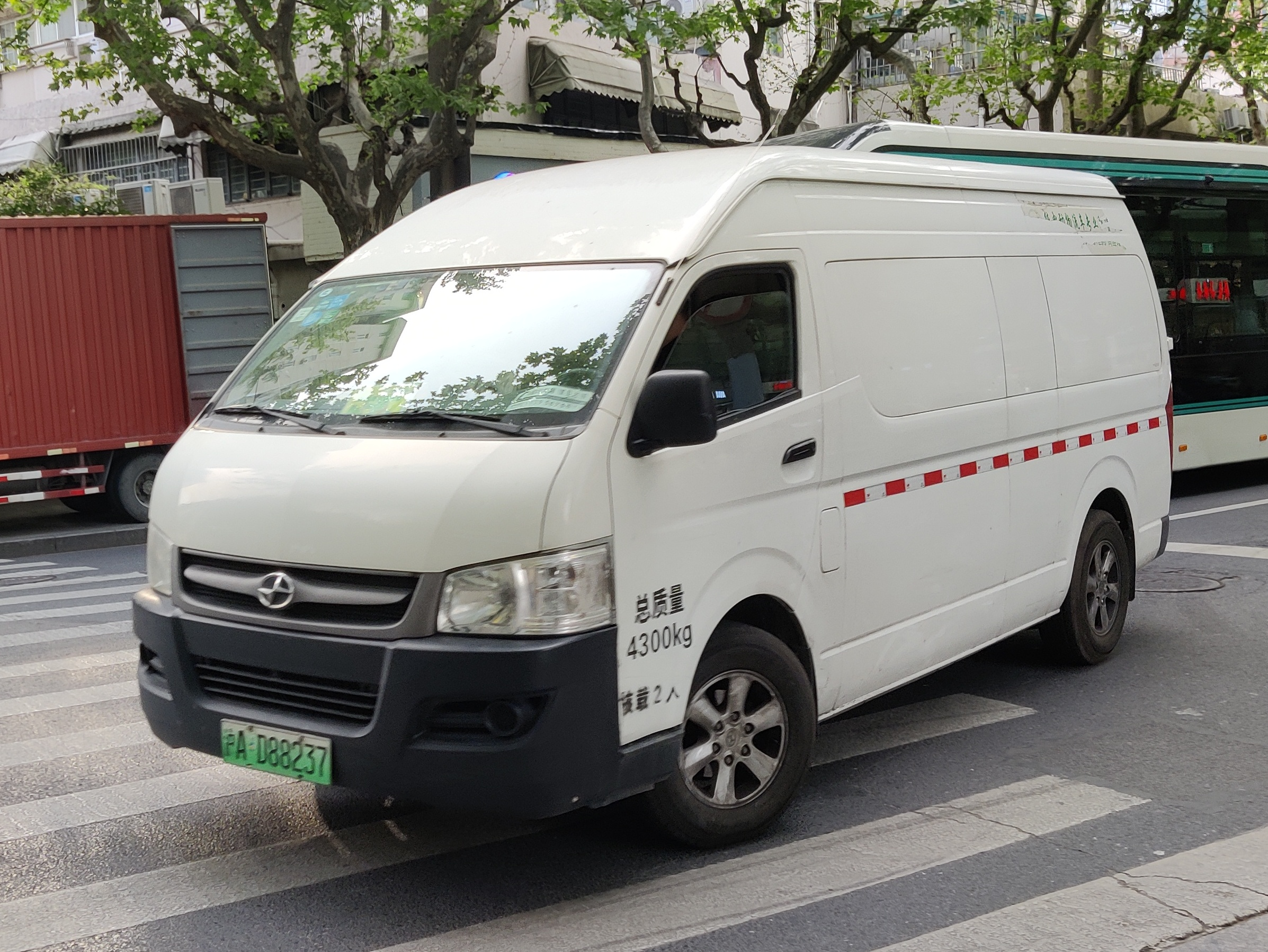
This was the first mass-produced electric van sold only in the China market, based on fifth generation Toyota HiAce, made from Joylong.

Other electric vehicles such as Nissan Leaf, Renault Zoe, Mitsubishi Outlander, Citroën Ami, Mitsubishi i-MiEV, Volkswagen ID.3 and Mazda MX-30, Zhongtong's hybrid van would not fight sales of electric vehicles because of having producing many vans and bring them to many customers. Zhongtong named World HEV Van because it's a first mass-produced van that is based on Toyota HiAce H200 van but running in hybrid drive powertrain, thanks to the CHAdeMO charging port located at beside the driver's door, just like HiAce fuel tank relocated did it by Toyota.

Unlike all electric vehicles, the LCK6600BEV-series is all together with Zhongtong LCK Platform lineup and Zhongtong recently released the low entry bus called Fashion. The Zhongtong Fashion was released in May 2021, the diesel engine and hybrid drivetrain and powertrain variants. Released in Philippine market exclusively for Premium Point-to-Point bus services, the Fashion nameplate is based on the heritage exclusive clothing wording. The model code for Fashion is LCK6125G. The hybrid variant model code for Fashion is LCK6101HEV or Fashion Hybrid. Zhongtong also released a new model called Magnate, released in 2019 and revised version of Elegance released on the same year. The new Zhongtong Magnate's model code is LCK6128H and revised Elegance with blue strobe light on side window is LCK6118H.

This was the first Zhongtong hybrid van sold only in the China market. The LCK6600BEV5 continued production due to being popular demand of HiAce H200 van clone. The Jinbei Grand Haise are among the various Chinese vans from domestic brands that chose to replicate the Toyota HiAce H200 vans with only minor styling differences. Other brands include government owned manufacturers including Rely, Jinbei, Golden Dragon, King Long, Joylong and Foton.

== Operations ==
The company states the combined floor-space of its facilities total around 300,000 square meters. A subsidiary, Xinjiang Zhongtong Bus Co Ltd, is responsible for a production line that became operational in 2007.

== Major customers ==
Zhongtong Bus' major customers include the city of Jinan, Shandong Province.

Zhongtong buses are widely used in the capital of Armenia, Yerevan. Most buses there run on methane.

It is also custom made for TransJakarta, a Bus Rapid Transit system in Jakarta, capital city of Indonesia.

=== Asia ===
==== Malaysia ====
In Malaysia, Zhongtong N8 buses are used in Melaka's Stage Bus Service Transformation (SBST) programme in mid-2024. SBST Melaka was later renamed BAS.MY Melaka.

Several more Zhongtong N8 buses were also procured for use on the BAS.MY networks in Seremban, Ipoh, Alor Setar, Kuantan, Kota Bharu, Kangar, Kuching and Kuala Terengganu.

=== Europe ===
==== Portugal ====
Zhongtong buses are present in the systems of Carris Metropolitana (Lisbon), Unir (Porto), STCP (Porto), TUB (Braga), Metro Mondego (Coimbra), Vai e Vem (Portimão), Giro (Albufeira) and Trevo (Évora).

Zhongtong was the best-selling bus brand in Portugal in 2023, with 209 new electric vehicles, taking the market by storm and dethroning Mercedes-Benz, according to data from ACAP.
