= Loyang Bus Depot =

Coordinates: 1.3677°N 103.967°E

Loyang Bus Depot: 洛阳巴士车厂; Depo Bas Loyang

General information
- Location: 2 Loyang Way; Singapore 508776
- System: Bus depot
- Operator: Go-Ahead Singapore (Go-Ahead Group plc)

Other information
- Website: www.go-aheadsingapore.com

History
- Opened: 19 June 2016; 10 years ago
Location

Loyang Bus Depot is a bus depot in Loyang, Singapore. The second bus depot following Bulim Bus Depot to be built by the Land Transport Authority, it is located at Loyang Way at the junction of Pasir Ris Drive 3. The depot serves 31 bus services under the Loyang Bus Package. It is currently being operated by Go-Ahead Singapore.

Completed in 2015, the new bus depot can accommodate up to 500 buses, and is equipped with facilities for daily bus operations, bus maintenance and a rest area for bus drivers. On 19 June 2016, the Loyang Bus Depot was officially opened by MP for Pasir Ris-Punggol Group Representation Constituency, Zainal Sapari and the Group Chief Executive of the Go-Ahead Group David Brown. Loyang Bus Depot Carnival was also held on the same day to allow the public to tour the depot and also learn more about Go-Ahead Singapore.

== History ==
Announced by LTA on 29 May 2013, the bus depot will be the second depot that LTA is developing and funding, as part of the review of the enhanced structural assistance that the government is providing the bus industry announced in Committee of Supply (COS) 2012. The depot is intended to accommodate the additional buses that it is bringing in over the next few years. The operator's existing bus depots and bus park are reaching full capacity, and the new facility is necessary to support the higher number of buses as the overall bus capacity is progressively increased under the Bus Service Enhancement Programme (BSEP).

On 11 December 2015, LTA handed the depot to Go-Ahead Singapore Pte Ltd for the operator to prepare for operations, as well as the recruitment and training of bus captains and technicians, to support a smooth transition.
