= Zainal Sapari =

Singaporean politician

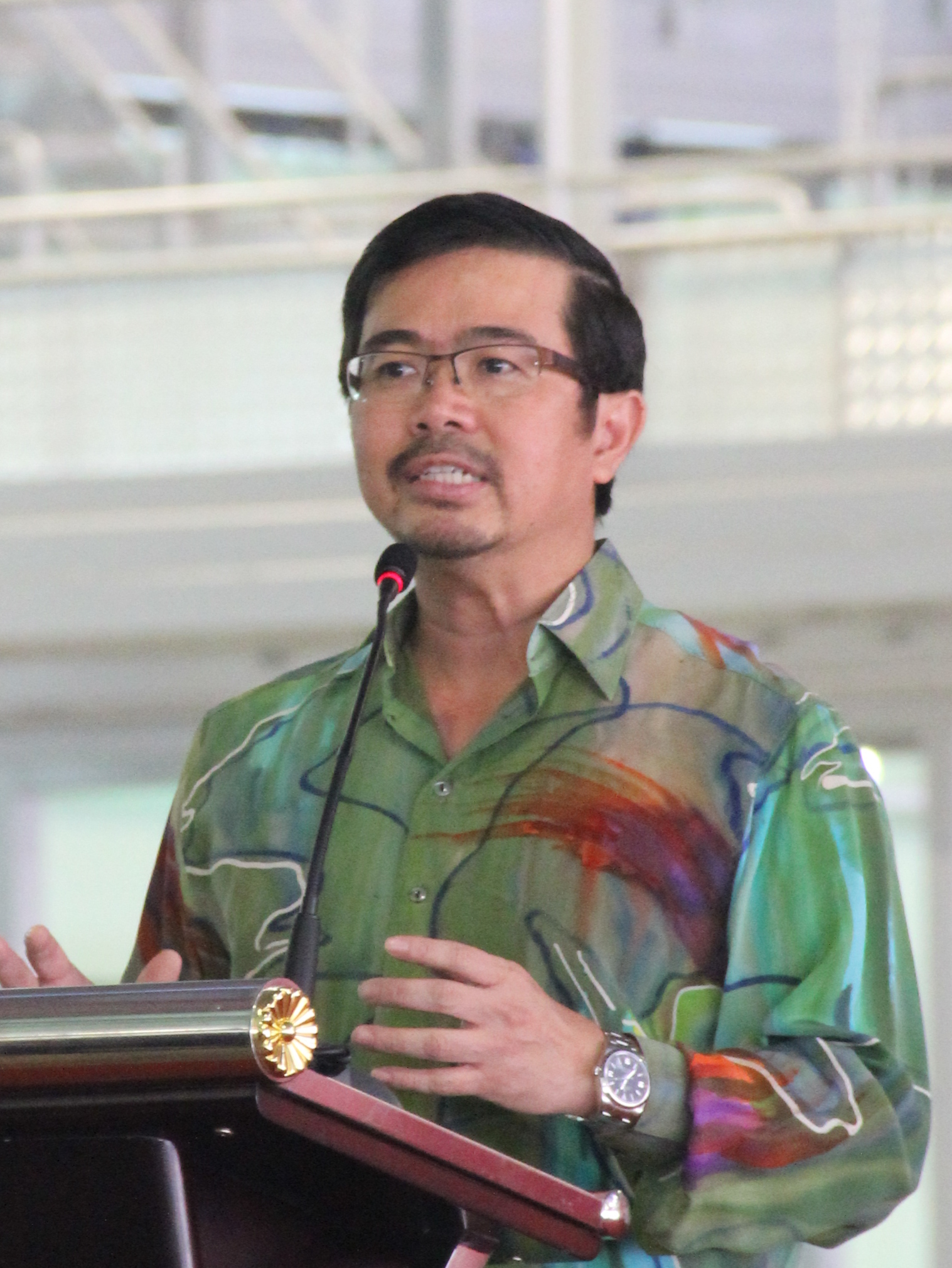
- Zainal speaking at the opening ceremony of Loyang Bus Depot in 2016

Member of Parliament for Pasir Ris–Punggol GRC (Pasir Ris East)
- In office 7 May 2011 – 23 June 2020
- Preceded by: Ahmad Magad (PAP)
- Succeeded by: Sharael Taha (PAP)

Personal details
- Born: 30 November 1965 (age 60) Singapore
- Party: People's Action Party
- Children: 6
- Education: Nanyang Technological University

Zainal bin Sapari (born 30 November 1965) is a Singaporean politician. A member of the governing People's Action Party (PAP), he was the Member of Parliament (MP) representing the Pasir Ris East division of Pasir Ris–Punggol Group Representation Constituency (GRC) between 2011 and 2020.

== Early life and career ==
Zainal comes from a family of seven with working-class parents.

Zainal was a St John's cadet at St Andrew's Secondary School.

In 1986, Zainal was awarded the Special Malay Bursary by the Singapore Government, where he became the first in his family to pursue an undergraduate education. He continued his education at the National University of Singapore and graduate with a Postgraduate Diploma in Education (PGDE) which propelled him into his career in education service. Zainal furthered his education at the Nanyang Technological University in 2007 and obtained a Master of Arts degree in Educational Management.

Zainal became a teacher, and subsequently a school principal and a superintendent with the Ministry of Education, overseeing a cluster of 12 schools in the eastern area.

== Career ==
Zainal started out union work with the Building Construction And Timber Industries Employees' Union (BATU) as a Director (Special Duty) of Industrial Relations, which was aligned to his interest in aiding low-wage workers. He progressed on to become the Assistant Secretary-General of NTUC and Director of NTUC Care and Share Department which helps low-wage workers, and casual and contract workers.

Zainal also served in the Education Sub-Committee of the Darul Ihsan, a Muslim orphanage, from 2004 to 2006.

=== Political career ===
In the 2011 general elections, Zainal was voted into the parliament of Singapore as one of the team members of the PAP led by Minister of Defence Teo Chee Hean. The team won the contest for Pasir Ris-Punggol GRC over Singapore Democratic Alliance (SDA) led by Harminder Pal Singh with 64.79% of the votes.

In Parliament, Zainal lobbied for the Progressive Wage Model. Zainal asked the ministry to commission a study on the living wage in Singapore before the implementation. The Progressive Wage Model was implemented in the cleaning and security sector first, followed by other sectors in the coming years.

Zainal also advocated for an end to “cheap sourcing”. He described cheap sourcing as a “gross injustice and slavery of the poor” and mandatory payslips to be enforced in the Employment Act.

Before the 2017 Singapore presidential elections (which was reserved for the Malay community), Zainal expressed a view that the various candidates were all "Malay" enough for the reserved election, and that Speaker of Parliament Halimah Yacob should qualify to run in the reserved election. He also shared an article which disagreed with Mendaki's "shallow and rigid definition of what is Malay".

Zainal pushed for an extension of the assistance scheme Enhanced Purple Heart Programme in his constituency, where needy families in Pasir Ris East received food vouchers to supplement their monthly expenditures. As part of his advocacy, he became a cleaner for one morning in order to gain first-hand experience of the difficulties faced by cleaners.

Zainal did not stand in the 2020 Singaporean general election, but remains affiliated with the PAP; he appeared at and spoke at rallies leading up to the 2025 Singaporean general election.

== Personal life ==
Zainal is married and has 6 children.

Parliament of Singapore
| Preceded by Ahmad Magad | Member of Parliament for Pasir Ris–Punggol GRC (Pasir Ris East); 2011 – 2020 | Succeeded by Sharael Taha |
