= Choa Chu Kang (disambiguation) =

Choa Chu Kang (or Chua Chu Kang) is a planning area and residential town situated in the West Region of Singapore.

Choa Chu Kang or Chua Chu Kang may also refer to:

- Chua Chu Kang Group Representation Constituency, a four-member Group Representation Constituency located in the western area of Singapore
- Chua Chu Kang Single Member Constituency, a Single Member Constituency (SMC) located in the western region of Singapore
- Choa Chu Kang Bus Interchange, a bus interchange which mainly serves the residential neighbourhood of Choa Chu Kang.
- Choa Chu Kang Camp, camp at Lorong Danau
- Choa Chu Kang Cemetery, the largest cemetery in Singapore.
- Choa Chu Kang Columbarium, located within the Choa Chu Kang Cemetery Complex, in Singapore.
- Choa Chu Kang MRT/LRT station, a Mass Rapid Transit (MRT) and Light Rail Transit (LRT) station in Choa Chu Kang, Singapore.
- Choa Chu Kang Park, a community park in Singapore located beside Kranji Expressway and along Choa Chu Kang Drive.
- Choa Chu Kang Public Library, a public library on the 4th and 5th floor of Lot One, Choa Chu Kang, Singapore.
- Choa Chu Kang Road, a road in Singapore in two sections.
- Choa Chu Kang Stadium, a part of the Choa Chu Kang Sports and Recreation complex in Choa Chu Kang.

== See also ==
- Choa Chu Kang West MRT station
