= Choa Chu Kang Public Library =

Public library in Singapore

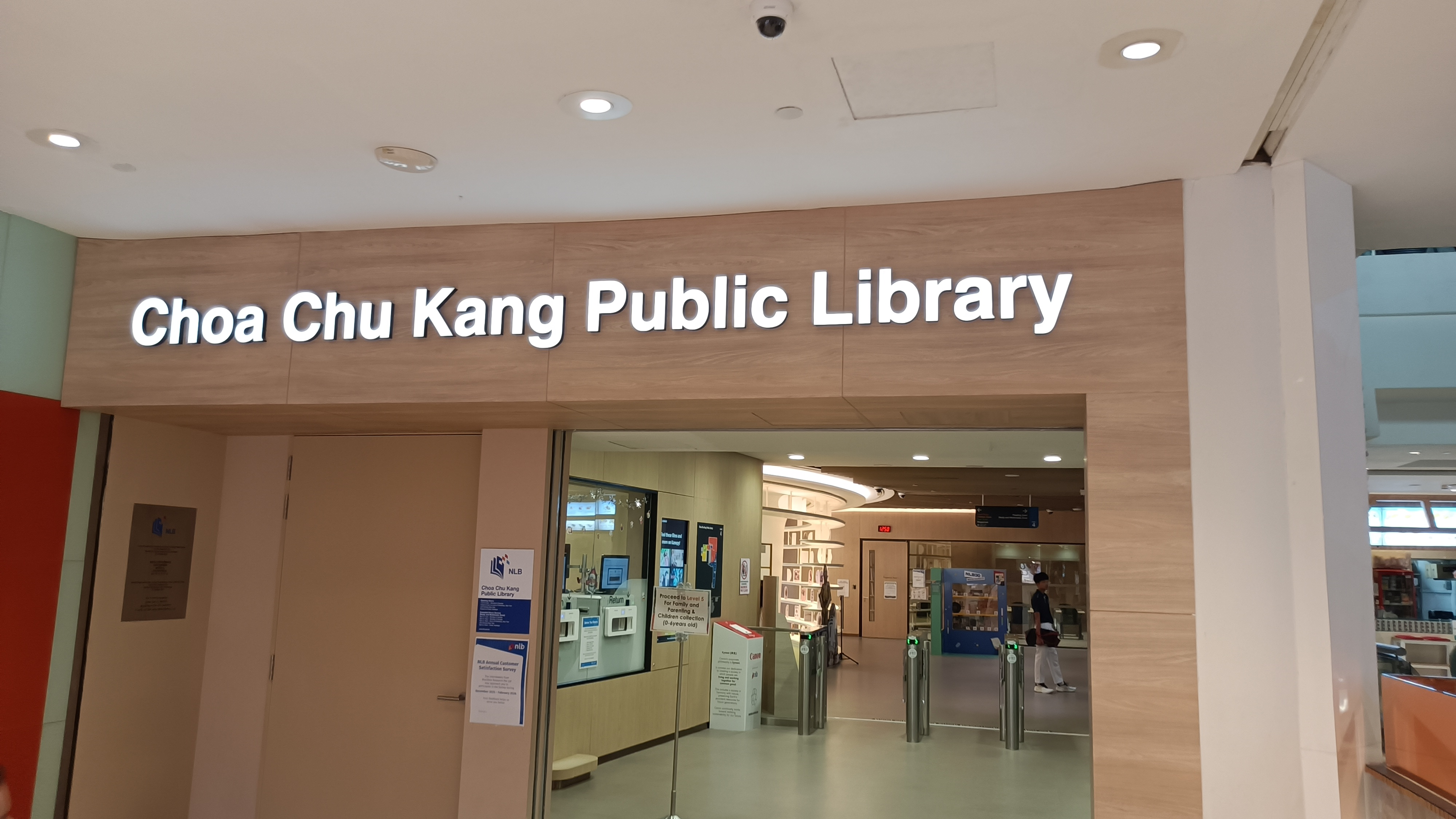
- Choa Chu Kang Public Library in December 2025
- 1.3852920415084775°N 103.74541016104756°E
- Location: 21 Choa Chu Kang Avenue 4, #04-01/02 & #05-06, Lot One, Singapore 689812
- Type: Public library
- Established: 22 February 1997; 29 years ago
- Branch of: National Library Board

Other information
- Public transit access: NS4 BP1 Choa Chu Kang, Choa Chu Kang Bus Interchange
- Website: www.nlb.gov.sg

Choa Chu Kang Public Library is a public library on the 4th and 5th floor of Lot One, Choa Chu Kang, Singapore. The library generates an average of 1.3 million loans each year. It is the second public library owned by the National Library Board to be located inside a mall.

== History ==
=== 1997 to 2008 ===
The library was first opened on 22 February 1997 on the 3rd floor of Lot One. It was opened by the then-Minister for Health and the Environment, Yeo Cheow Tong. The library had an area of 1,477 square-metres and a book collection of about 174,663 volumes and a journal collection of 9,837 volumes.

The library was the first in Singapore to install self-check machines for borrowing and returning of books. It was prototyped with Borrower's Enquiry Machines with CashCard payment in June 1998. The library also had a Customer Service counter which displays a picture of the last tiger to roam this part of Singapore.

The library was closed on 1 November 2008 for the relocation.

=== 2008 to 2019 ===
The library was relocated to the 4th floor for a larger space area. It was reopened on 21 November 2008 by the Member of Parliament for Hong Kah GRC, Zaqy Mohamad. The new library had its seating capacity increased from 93 to 233. It also has new shelves and new books. The new library was 38% larger than the one on the third floor.

The library was inspired by the nearby farming industries in Choa Chu Kang, Lim Chu Kang and Kranji. The design concept of the Choa Chu Kang Community Library steers towards the serenity of nature, with the use of green and wood tones.

=== 2019 ===
On 10 June 2019, the library was 'temporarily' closed without warning, supposedly for improvements, leaving thousands of Choa Chu Kang residents without access to library space, facilities and books for a period of two years until 2021. It was reopened on 28 October 2021.

== Volumes ==
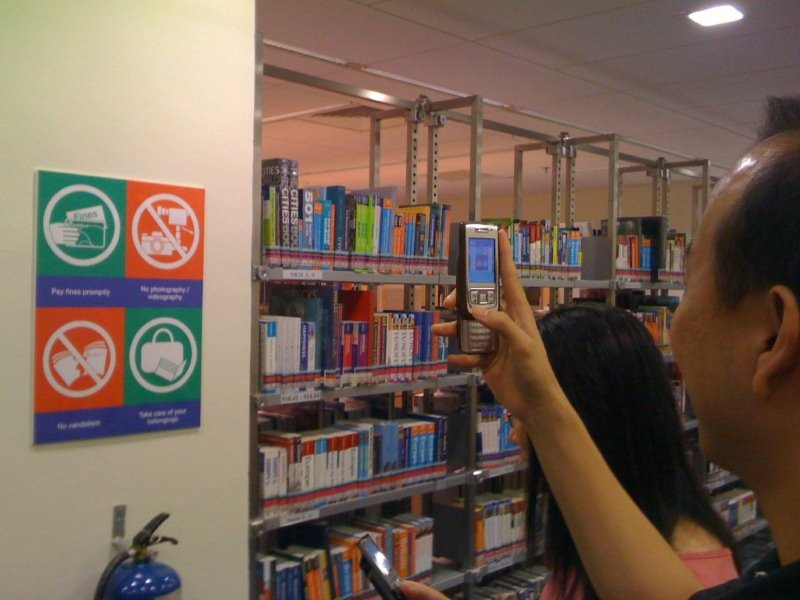
Geographical related volumes

The library currently has approximately 190,000 volumes comprising magazine titles, fiction titles and non-fiction titles.

The Children's Collection has about 74,000 volumes, while the Adults' Collection contains 95,240 volumes of books. There are about 390 local and international magazine titles and 10 newspaper titles.

The library collection will grow to 210,000 volumes by the first quarter of 2009.

== Facilities ==
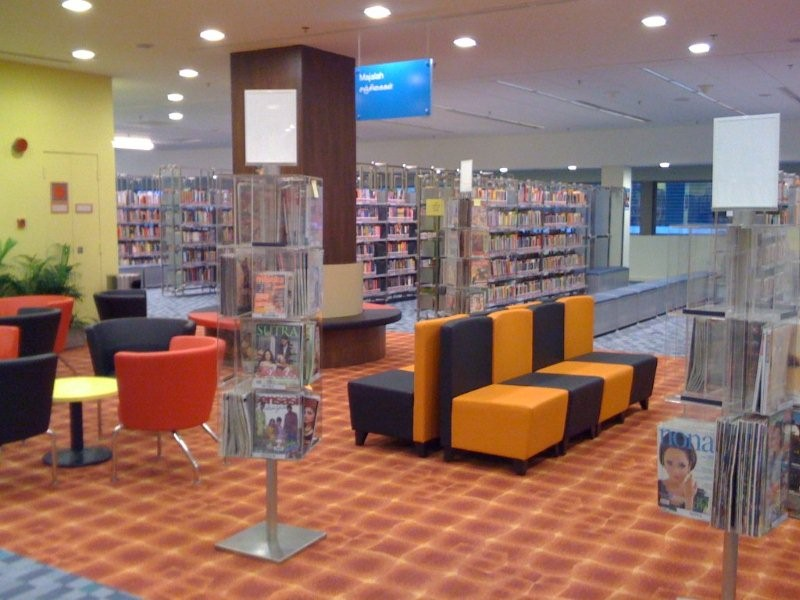
Reading area

The library has facilities that include:

- Online public access catalogue
- Multimedia stations
- Self-service borrowing stations
- Library e-kiosks
- Book drop
- 'Storytelling zone' (For library staff and volunteers to read to children)
- 'Talk zone' (For users to make and receive telephone calls)

== Opening hours ==
The library opens from Monday to Sunday at 11am to 9pm. It only opens till 5pm on Christmas Eve, New Year's Eve and the eve of Chinese New Year. It closes on public holidays. The Study and Multimedia Zone is open from 9am to 10pm (including Public Holidays, eves of Christmas, New Year, and Chinese New Year). The bookdrop is open from 10am to 10pm daily.

== See also ==
- List of libraries in Singapore
