= Cheris Lee =

Singaporean singer

- 李函穆
- Born: Cheris Lee Han Mu; 11 September 1996 (age 29); Singapore
- Education: Outram Secondary School; ITE College West
- Alma mater: Singapore Media Academy
- Occupations: Singer; model; actress
- Years active: 2016–present
- Musical career
- Genres: K-pop; dance
- Instruments: Vocals
- Years active: 2018–2020
- Labels: ProBeat Company; LOUDers Entertainment
- Formerly of: GBB

Chinese name
- Traditional Chinese: 李函穆
- Simplified Chinese: 李函穆
- Hanyu Pinyin: Lǐ Hánmù
- Wade–Giles: Li Han-mu

Cheris Lee (Chinese: 李函穆; Korean: 체리스; born 11 September 1996), is a Singaporean singer, dancer, model and actress. Lee is a former member of the South Korean girl group, GBB.

== Career ==
=== Pre-debut ===
Lee was scouted by one of South Korea's biggest entertainment company, SM Entertainment, when she was 15 years old while on a holiday. However, she rejected the offer to become a singer as her mother opposed her to go to South Korea alone and she did not know about the company and K-pop. After returning to Singapore, she discovered the charms of the Korean wave, as well as her passion for singing and dancing since young, so she started contacting various South Korean entertainment agencies. From there, she began flying back and forth between Singapore and South Korea for 3 years, while studying at Outram Secondary School and ITE College West, before officially flying to South Korea to become a full-time trainee.

Lee was a trainee for 7 years and 4 months, and had 3 opportunities to debut but were all cancelled in the end.

Lee also made a cameo appearance in Thailand TV series, Zeal5 in 2015.

Lee was a contestant in Miss Singapore International where she took part in 2016 and got into the top 16.

=== 2017–2018: First lead role, debut with GBB ===
In 2017, Lee was cast and played her first lead role, while making her acting debut in the Singaporean, Starhub Go production, Love in Transit.

On 1 May 2018, Lee made her debut in South Korea as the only foreign member of the 5-member girl group, GBB, with their first ever single, Kemi, and their debut mini album, Girls Be The Best.

=== 2020-present: Activities in Singapore ===
In 2020, Lee participated in the second season of dating show The Destined One.

In 2021, Lee made a cameo appearance in Key Witness, before playing her first major television drama role in Live Your Dreams. Both were broadcast on Mediacorp Channel 8. On 16 August 2021, she graduated with a Diploma in Acting (Chinese) from Singapore Media Academy.

On 29 June 2022, Lee acted as the main lead for Zach’s MV ‘牵你的手’.

== Filmography ==
=== Television series ===
| Year | Title | Role | Notes | Ref. |
|---|---|---|---|---|
| 2017 | Love in Transit 下一站•爱 | Cheris | Lead | |
| 2021 | Key Witness 关键证人 | Park Kyo-eun 朴乔恩 | Cameo | |
| 2021 | Live Your Dreams 大大的梦想 | Li Shu Qi 黎舒淇 | Supporting | |
| 2022 | I Want To Be A Towkay 亲家、冤家做头家 | Serene | Cameo | |
| 2022 | Dark Angel 黑天使 | Apple | Cameo | |

=== Television shows ===
| Year | Title | Notes | Ref. |
|---|---|---|---|
| 2018 | Greener Pastures 离家。出走 | Documentary | |
| 2020 | The Destined One (Season 2) 众里寻一 | Variety | |

== Awards and nominations ==
| Year | Organisation | Category | Nominated work | Result | Ref |
|---|---|---|---|---|---|
| 2023 | Star Awards | Top 3 Most Popular Rising Stars | —N/a | Nominated | |
