= Junction 10 =

Shopping mall in Singapore

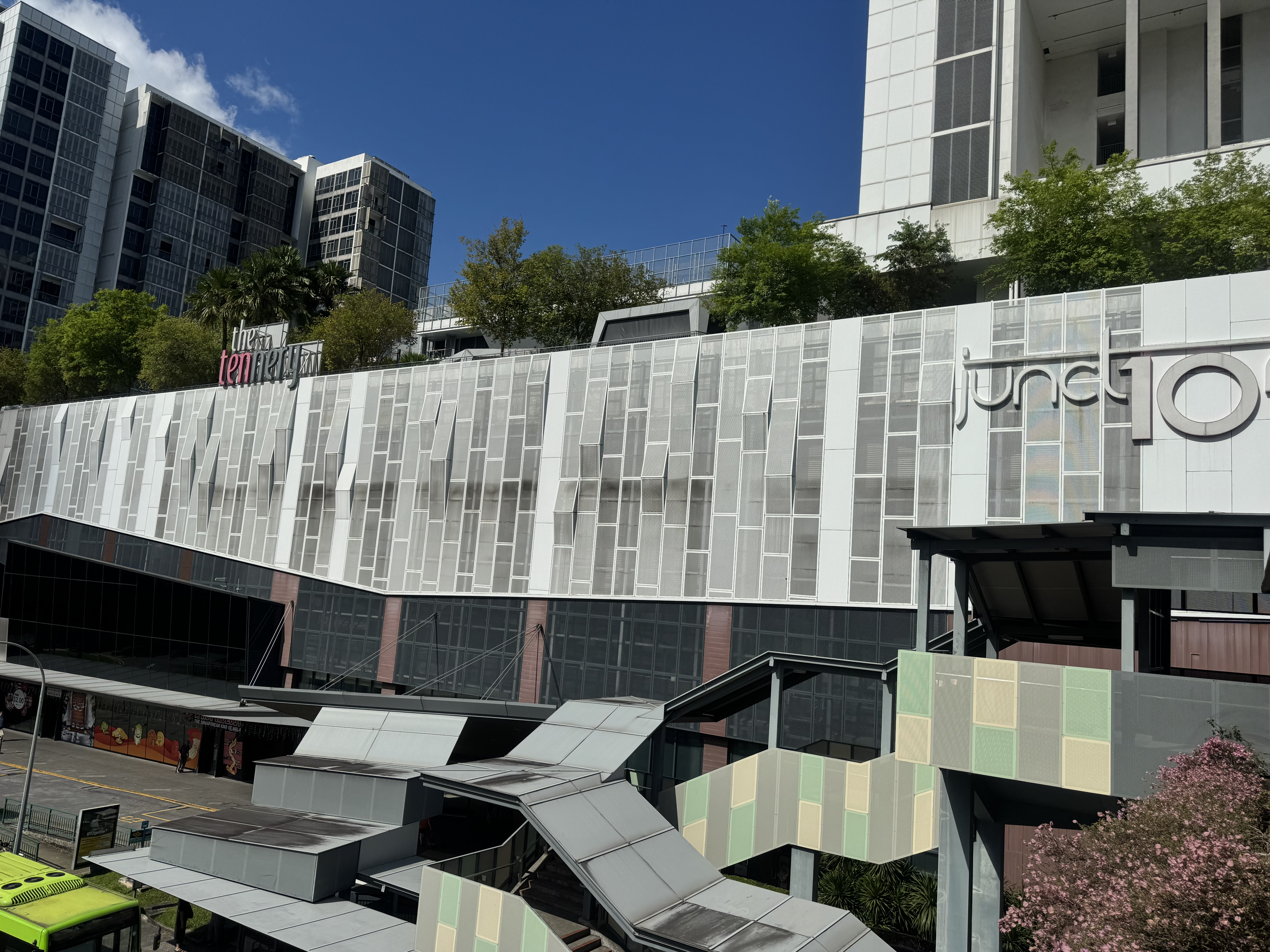
- Junction 10 in 2025
- Location: 1 Woodlands Road, Singapore 677899
- Coordinates: 1°22′49″N 103°45′36″E
- Opened: 1998; 28 years ago (as Ten Mile Junction); 30 December 2011; 14 years ago (as Junction 10)
- Developer: Far East Organization
- Manager: Far East Retail
- Owner: Far East Organization
- Num. of stores: 45
- Num. of anchor tenants: 2
- Floor area: 90,879 square feet (8,442.9 m^{2})
- Floors: 4
- Website: Junction10

Junction 10, formerly Ten Mile Junction, is a shopping centre in Choa Chu Kang, Singapore located at the junction of Choa Chu Kang Road and Woodlands Road.

== Background ==
The mall opened in 1998 as Ten Mile Junction (十里广场). It is owned by Far East Organization.

It was accessible via the then-operational Ten Mile Junction LRT station, on the Bukit Panjang LRT line, which has been permanently closed since 13 January 2019. The platform was located on level 3 of the complex, which also houses the Ten Mile Junction Depot adjacent to the station. Today, the complex can be accessed via Exit B or C of Bukit Panjang MRT station.

The shopping mall was closed on 10 December 2010 and reopened on 30 December 2011 as Junction 10. It is stylized as JUNCT10N, similar to Junction 8 in Bishan.

After reopening, Junction 10 became a mixed-use development, together with The Tennery, a private housing estate occupying levels 4 and above, which opened in 2014. They consists of 338 innovative SOHO-style loft apartments with a variety of recreational facilities such as open-air swimming pools and tennis courts.

It is currently anchored by Mindchamps Preschool, Fitness First (formerly Celebrity Fitness), and Sheng Siong (formerly occupied by Giant Hypermarket). In addition, the two-level mall is home to tuition centres, lifestyle shops, beauty & wellness services and family restaurants, and features an integrated car park.
