= Lot One =

- Exterior facade of Lot One in 2026.
- Location: 21 Choa Chu Kang Avenue 4, Singapore 689812
- Coordinates: 1.3851223°N 103.7427255°E
- Opened: August 1996; 30 years ago
- Owner: CapitaMall Trust
- Num. of stores: 148
- Num. of anchor tenants: 5
- Floor area: 301,515 square feet (28,011.7 m^{2})
- Floors: 6
- Public transit: NS4 JS1 BP1 Choa Chu Kang
- Website: Lot One

Lot One Shoppers' Mall is a shopping mall serving Choa Chu Kang New Town, Singapore. It was opened in 1996 and is managed by CapitaMall Trust. It is located next to Choa Chu Kang MRT/LRT and the Choa Chu Kang Bus Interchange.

== History ==
Developed by City Developments Limited, Lot One was opened in August 1996 as the first major shopping mall in Choa Chu Kang. Like a typical suburban mall that time, it featured a Shaw Theatres cinema, an NTUC FairPrice supermarket, a Seiyu (now BHG) department store, the Choa Chu Kang Public Library, a Cathay bowling alley, a video games arcade, a Food Junction food court and slightly over 100 specialty shops.

In 2005, the mall was sold to CapitaLand Ltd.

In July 2007, the mall underwent its first renovation works, such as adding a four-storey retail extension and reconfiguring the shops in the mall. During this period, the food court was relocated from Basement 1 to Level 4, and the public library relocated from Level 3 to Level 4, taking over the former bowling alley. The arcade was re-allocated to a smaller space at Level 5 from Level 4. A roof garden, incorporating a wet and dry playground, was added during the final phase of the renovation. Renovation works were completed in late 2008.

In 2019, the cinema and library were closed for extensive renovation works, in which the cinema had its number of screens doubled to meet the needs of moviegoers in the area, while the library had its space expanded to include more content. Both of them reopened in September and October 2021 respectively. On 1 May 2022, Food Junction closed for a facelift, and has reopened on 18 July 2022 and in May 2023 BHG closed its store in Lot One. In its place, Cotton On and Uniqlo opened in November 2023.

In June 2025, Harvey Norman opened a store.
