= Choa Chu Kang Road =

Road in Singapore

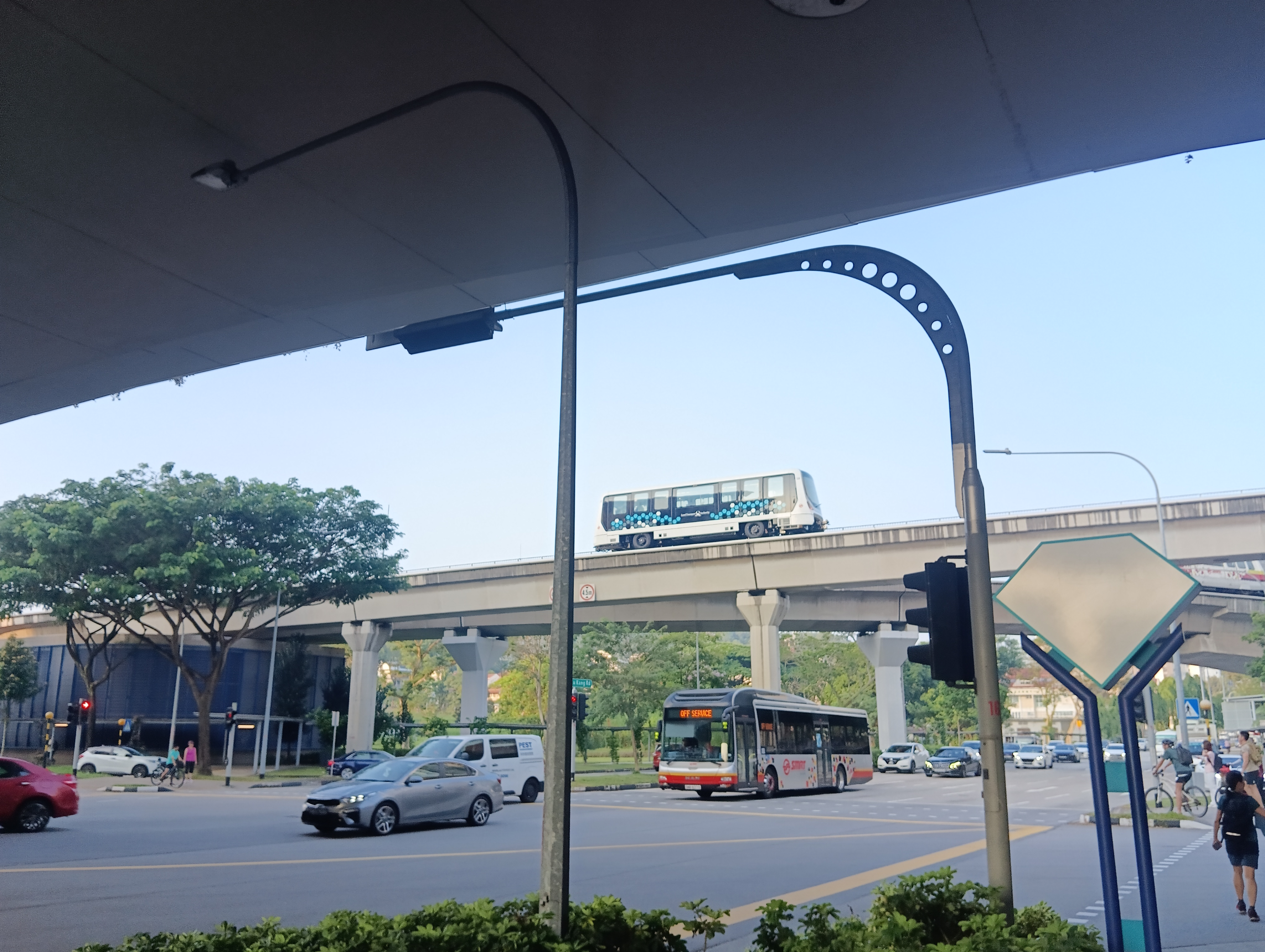
- A photo of Choa Chu Kang Road, taken from its intersection with Upper Bukit Timah Road.

Major junctions
- From: Upper Bukit Timah Road
- To: Bukit Batok Road

Location
- Country: Singapore
- Coordinates: 1.3781°N 103.7575°E

Highway system
- Transport in Singapore

Choa Chu Kang Road (Chinese: 蔡厝港路) is a road in Singapore which starts from Upper Bukit Timah Road.

== Translations ==
Choa Chu Kang Road
- Traditional Chinese: 蔡厝港路
- Simplified Chinese: 蔡厝港路
- Hokkien POJ: Chhòa Chhù Káng Lō͘
Transcriptions
Standard Mandarin
- Hanyu Pinyin: Cài Cuò Gǎng Lù
Southern Min
- Hokkien POJ: Chhòa Chhù Káng Lō͘

== History ==
Choa Chu Kang Road was originally a continuous road from Upper Bukit Timah Road to Jalan Sungei Poyan. However, as can be seen from historical maps of Singapore, development of the Choa Chu Kang town resulted in Choa Chu Kang Road being dissected into two sections some time between 1975 and 1984. Parts of the original Choa Chu Kang Road within Choa Chu Kang town are now occupied by the present day roads Choa Chu Kang Terrace and the part of Choa Chu Kang Avenue 1 south of Choa Chu Kang Way.

== Road sections ==
Choa Chu Kang Road is divided into two roads - the one to the east is called Choa Chu Kang Road, and the one to the west is called Old Choa Chu Kang Road.

=== Choa Chu Kang Road ===
The first section is a short stretch from the junctions of Woodlands Road and Upper Bukit Timah Road and ends at the junction of Choa Chu Kang Way and Bukit Batok Road, providing an access to Choa Chu Kang town from Upper Bukit Timah Road. It connects various LRT stations - such as Phoenix LRT station and Teck Whye LRT station, and ITE College West is situated there.

=== Old Choa Chu Kang Road ===
The second and much longer section starts from Sungei Tengah Road all the way to the SAFTI Live Firing Area and SAFTI City Urban Training Facility at Jalan Sungei Poyan, in the vicinity of National Shooting Centre. It is named Old Choa Chu Kang Road (Chinese: 旧蔡厝港路). On 1994, with the partial closure of Choa Chu Kang Road, it was amended via Sungei Tengah Road for the construction of Kranji Expressway.

Old Choa Chu Kang Road leads to a number of military facilities, including Tengah Air Base, Army Logistics Base, Keat Hong Camp, Choa Chu Kang Camp, Poyan 300m Rifle Range, SAFTI City Urban Training Facility and if counting also Lim Chu Kang Road, also Lim Chu Kang Camp, Murai Camp and Sungei Gedong Camp. Home Team Academy is also located along Old Choa Chu Kang Road. The eastern end of Old Choa Chu Kang Road (near the interchange with Kranji Expressway) leads to the Sungei Tengah Argotechnology Park, one of the few farming areas in Singapore. It also leads to the cemetery - called Choa Chu Kang Cemetery.

Old Choa Chu Kang Road has several bus services -

- 172 and 975 from KJE to Jalan Bahar
- 405 and 975 from Jalan Bahar to New Lim Chu Kang Road
- 405 from New Lim Chu Kang Road to Jalan Sungei Poyan, where the bus makes a U-turn at the end of Old Choa Chu Kang Road and the bus stop is called "bef SAFTI City".

=== Choa Chu Kang Avenue 1 ===
Choa Chu Kang Avenue 1, along the Comfort Garden private estate, the now-demolished Keat Hong Camp I & II (and it was redeveloped into Choa Chu Kang Neighbourhood 8) as well as the nearby seafood restaurant, was part of the section of Choa Chu Kang Road. The remains of Choa Chu Kang Road were also absorbed into Choa Chu Kang Avenue 1 and Avenue 3 respectively.
