= Singapore Media Academy =

Singapore Media Academy 新加坡传媒学院
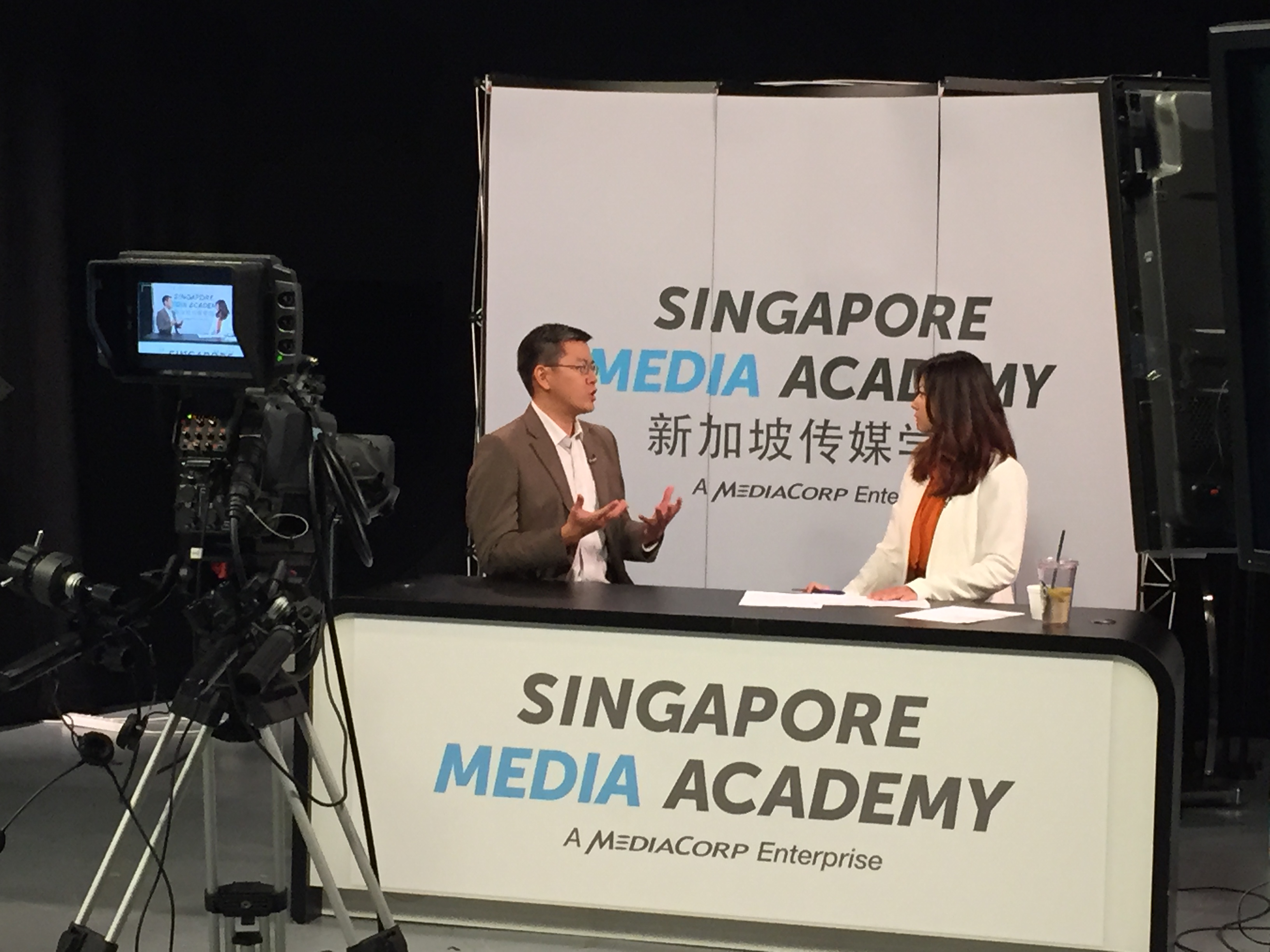
- TV interview practice with newscaster Otelli Edwards (right) during a media training workshop at the Singapore Media Academy

Address
- 1 Stars Avenue Singapore

Information
- Type: Private
- Established: November 2005
- Founder: Mediacorp

The Singapore Media Academy (SMA) (Chinese: 新加坡传媒学院), a wholly owned subsidiary of Mediacorp, is a media continuing education and training (CET) centre for creative industries. Incorporated in November 2005, the Academy offers training, educational and consultancy services to address the needs of the local and regional media industries.

== Continuing Education and Training (CET) Centre ==
The Singapore Media Academy was appointed by the Singapore Workforce Development Agency (WDA) in October 2008 as a media continuing education and training (CET) centre to offer workforce skills qualifications (WSQ) training under the Creative Industries WSQ (CI WSQ) framework, which was developed to address manpower and training needs of the media industry in Singapore.

The Academy currently has a campus at Mediacorp Campus.
