= Choa Chu Kang =

Planning area and residential town in Singapore

- Planning Area and HDB Town

Other transcription(s)
  - Chinese: 蔡厝港; Càicuògǎng (Pinyin); Chhòa-chhù-káng (Hokkien POJ); Tshuà-tshù-káng (TLPA)
  - Malay: Choa Chu Kang
  - Tamil: சுவா சூ காங் Cuvā cū kāṅ (Transliteration)
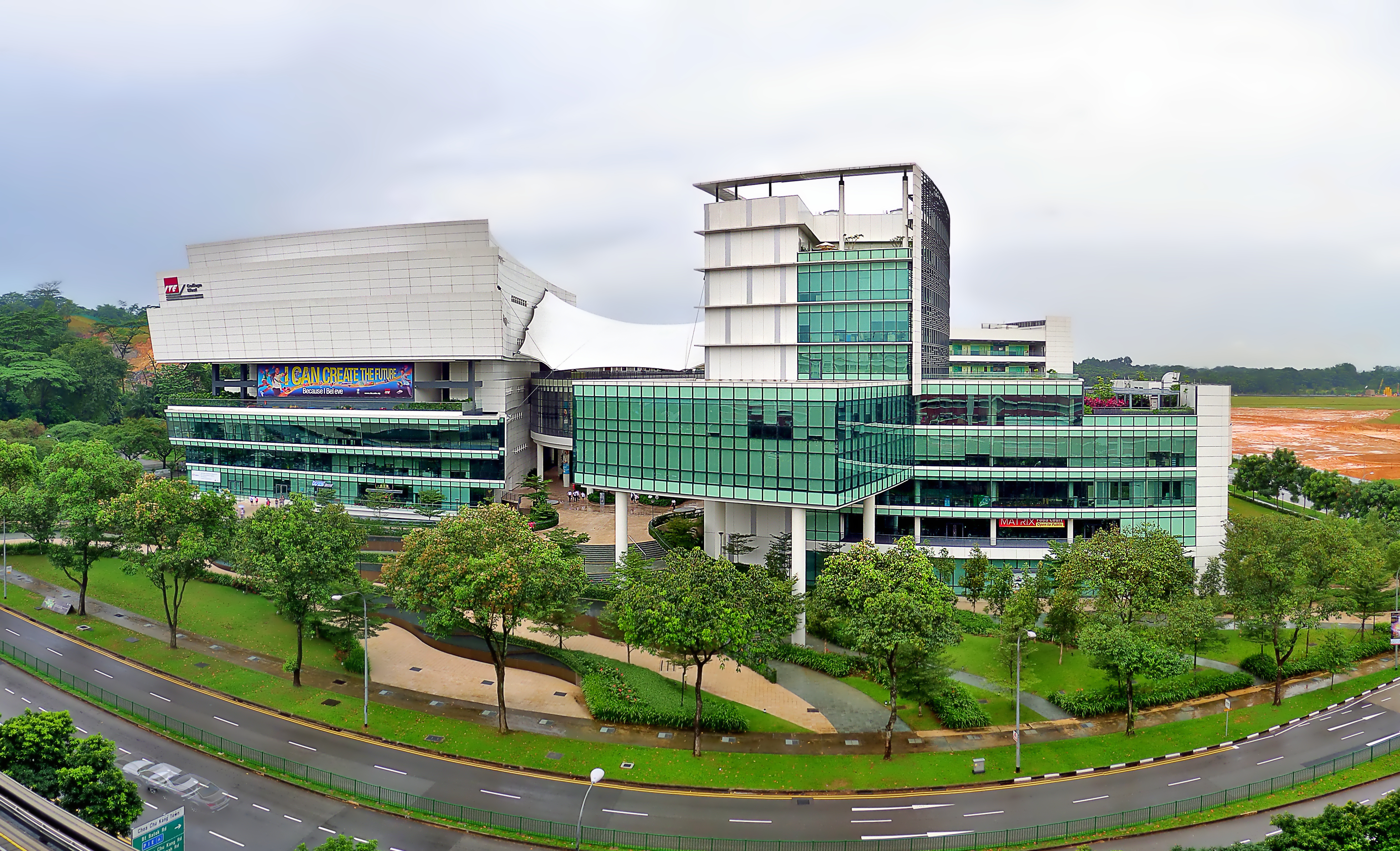
- From top, left to right: Aerial view of Choa Chu Kang, Choa Chu Kang Community Club, SAFRA Choa Chu Kang, ITE College West, Lot One Shoppers' Mall

- Location of Choa Chu Kang in Singapore

- Location of Choa Chu Kang within Singapore
- Coordinates: 1°23′N 103°45′E
- Country: Singapore
- Region: West Region
- CDCs: North West CDC; South West CDC
- Town councils: Chua Chu Kang Town Council; Marsiling-Yew Tee Town Council
- Constituencies: Chua Chu Kang GRC; Marsiling-Yew Tee GRC

Government
  - Mayors: North West CDC: Alex Yam; South West CDC: Low Yen Ling
  - Members of Parliament: Chua Chu Kang GRC: Tan See Leng; Jeffrey Siow; Zhulkarnain Abdul Rahim; Marsiling-Yew Tee GRC: Alex Yam; Lawrence Wong

Area
  - Total: 6.12 km^{2} (2.36 sq mi)
  - Residential: 3.07 km^{2} (1.19 sq mi)

Population (2026)
  - Total: 185,520
  - Density: 30,300/km^{2} (78,500/sq mi)

Ethnic groups
  - Chinese: 133,520
  - Malays: 35,500
  - Indians: 18,020
  - Others: 5,020
- Postal district: 23
- Postal sector: 67, 68 (Note: The section of Choa Chu Kang east of the Pang Sua Park Connector is in postal sector 67, while the rest of the planning area is in postal sector 68.)
- Dwelling units: 42,393
- Projected ultimate: 62,000

Choa Chu Kang (IPA: /ˈtʃwɑːˈtʃuːˈkɑːŋ/ CHWAH-choo-KAHNG), alternatively spelled Chua Chu Kang and often abbreviated as CCK, is a planning area and new town in the West Region of Singapore. It is bordered by Sungei Kadut to the north, Tengah and Bukit Batok to the south, Bukit Panjang to the east, and Western Water Catchment to the west.

Choa Chu Kang was originally a kampung before it was developed by the Housing and Development Board (HDB) into a modern residential town. The town includes several subzones, including Choa Chu Kang Central, Choa Chu Kang North, Yew Tee, Teck Whye and Keat Hong.

The name is commonly spelt Choa Chu Kang in transport facilities, public amenities and parks, while the alternative spelling Chua Chu Kang is used for some schools, community facilities and political entities. The planning area also includes areas around Old Choa Chu Kang Road, which contain military installations and other non-residential uses.

== Etymology ==
Choa Chu Kang's name is derived from its historical core at the former site of Chua Chu Kang Village located near the junction of Choa Chu Kang Road and Jalan Sungei Poyan, currently occupied by the grounds of the National Shooting Centre which comes under the purview of Singapore Shooting Association. The name began to be applied to the general area around the village when Choa Chu Kang Road, a main arterial road linking the village to Upper Bukit Timah Road towards the east was built.

The name "Choa Chu Kang" is derived from the Teochew word "chu kang" (厝港, Peng'im: cu3 gang2), meaning "back port". In the nineteenth century, Chinese immigrants planted gambier and pepper along the river banks of Choa Chu Kang, although many migrated to Johor to the north at the encouragement of the Temenggong of Johor. The plantation owners were known as Kangchu (港主, Peng'im: gang2 zu2)- the word "kang" refers to the riverbank and "chu" means "owner" or "master", referring to the headman in charge of the plantations in the area. "Choa" is the clan name of the first headman.

== History ==
=== Early history ===
Choa Chu Kang was a diverse area with old kampong housing and rubber plantations. Residents had to depend on boats or bullock carts for transportation. Among the few villages which sprang up were Kampong Belimbing and Chua Chu Kang Village. Most of the inhabitants belonged to the Teochew dialect group. The early Teochew settlers were mainly farmers growing gambier and pepper. The Hokkiens, who moved in later, established pineapple, rubber and coconut plantations as well as vegetable farms and poultry farms. In the early days, tigers used to roam in the area. The last tiger of Singapore was shot here in the 1930s.

Kampong Belimbing, Chua Chu Kang Village and Kampong Berih were demolished in phases from 1993 to 1998. It was replaced by the National Shooting Centre and military plot (Cemetery North) and (Jalan Bahar). The Cemetery North has been gazetted as an army restricted and live-firing area since 19 September 2003. The Jalan Bahar is gazetted as an army restricted and live-firing area from 16 March 2001.

The name Choa Chu Kang is used for Choa Chu Kang Road and its nearby facilities. However, the original name Chua Chu Kang is retained in the cemetery area.

=== Pre-New Town (before 1980s) ===
In 1957, the Singapore Improvement Trust (SIT) launched Bukit Panjang Estate. The estate was later renamed to Teck Whye Estate along present day Jalan Teck Whye. These flats were sold as low-cost alternatives for those working in the Bukit Timah region. In 1977, the first HDB blocks were built along Teck Whye Avenue.

At the time, this area would have been considered to be part of Bukit Panjang based on historical maps.

=== New town era (1980s onwards) ===
The new town era evolved in 1985 when Teck Whye was developed (the first HDB blocks since 1977), and it was extended to four neighbourhoods by 1992 with the truncation of Choa Chu Kang Road. Yew Tee was developed in 1997 as the three northern neighbourhoods of Choa Chu Kang, north of the Kranji Expressway. Choa Chu Kang's latest (eighth) neighbourhood, Keat Hong, bound to the south by Brickland Road, was developed in 2015.

Despite Choa Chu Kang New Town's modest population size, Choa Chu Kang is the densest New Town as of the 2025 census.

Choa Chu Kang New Town has a total of 8 neighbourhoods, with the first digit of the HDB block numbers indicating which neighbourhood that block belongs to - single and double digit blocks are under Neighbourhood 1. The boundaries for the neighbourhoods are as follows:

- N1: Woodlands Road, Choa Chu Kang Road, Choa Chu Kang Way, Choa Chu Kang Avenue 1
- N2: Choa Chu Kang Avenue 3, Choa Chu Kang Avenue 1
- N3: Kranji Expressway, Choa Chu Kang Avenue 3, Choa Chu Kang Way
- N4: Brickland Road, Kranji Expressway, Choa Chu Kang Way, Choa Chu Kang Avenue 3, Choa Chu Kang Avenue 1, Choa Chu Kang Avenue 6
- N5: Kranji Expressway, Choa Chu Kang Way, Choa Chu Kang North 6, Choa Chu Kang Drive
- N6: Choa Chu Kang North 6, Choa Chu Kang Way, Pang Sua Canal
- N7: Kranji Expressway, Choa Chu Kang Drive, Choa Chu Kang North 6, Pang Sua Canal
- N8: Choa Chu Kang Way, Bukit Batok Road, Brickland Road, Choa Chu Kang Avenue 6, Choa Chu Kang Avenue 1

Choa Chu Kang New Town has one town centre and five neighbourhood centres. The town centre, in N3, is the area around Choa Chu Kang MRT/LRT station. It includes the MRT and LRT stations, bus interchange, Lot One Shopper's Mall, Choa Chu Kang Centre, Keat Hong Community Club and 302-307 Choa Chu Kang Avenue 4.

The other neighbourhood centres are Teck Whye Shopping Centre (N1), Keat Hong Shopping Centre (N2), Sunshine Place (N4), Limbang Shopping Centre (N5), and Yew Tee Square (N6). As of 2024, N7 and N8 do not have plans for commercial nodes and hence neighbourhood centres.

== Demographics ==
=== Population history ===
Resident population history
Year	Pop.	±% p.a.
2000	136,810	—
2005	161,190	+3.33%
2010	173,290	+1.46%
2015	174,330	+0.12%
2020	192,070	+1.96%
2025	187,550	−0.48%
2026	185,520	−1.08%

=== Age profile ===
The data below is from the population report published by the Singapore Department of Statistics as of June 2026.

Age group (years)	Males	Females	Total population	% of total population
0–4	3,430	3,230	6,660	3.59
5–9	4,210	4,080	8,290	4.47
10–14	4,670	4,550	9,220	4.97
15–19	5,060	4,770	9,830	5.30
20–24	5,750	5,480	11,230	6.05
25–29	7,540	7,110	14,650	7.90
30–34	7,730	7,600	15,330	8.26
35–39	6,430	6,830	13,260	7.15
40–44	5,820	6,360	12,180	6.57
45–49	5,600	6,320	11,920	6.43
50–54	6,080	6,760	12,840	6.92
55–59	6,750	7,740	14,490	7.81
60–64	7,920	7,690	15,610	8.41
65–69	6,420	5,780	12,200	6.58
70–74	4,260	4,160	8,420	4.54
75–79	2,500	2,690	5,190	2.80
80–84	930	1,220	2,150	1.16
85–89	490	840	1,330	0.72
90+	210	540	750	0.40

Age group (years)	Males	Females	Total population	% of total population
0–14	12,310	11,860	24,170	13.0
15–64	64,680	66,660	131,340	70.8
65+	14,810	15,230	30,040	16.2

Population pyramid of Choa Chu Kang in 2026

The population distribution of Choa Chu Kang in 2026 demonstrates an ageing population structure, with more elderly residents above age 65 than children between 0 and 14 years old. There is a higher population concentration among older working-age residents aged 55 to 64, with males peaking at the 60–64 age range (4.27%) and females peaking at the 55–59 age range (4.17%).

=== Household ===
Resident population by dwelling type in Choa Chu Kang (2000−2026)
Year	HDB flats		Condominiums and other apartments		Landed properties	
Year	Pop.	Percentage	Pop.	Percentage	Pop.	Percentage
2000	133,500	97.6%	2,620	1.9%	590	0.4%
2005	147,840	91.7%	10,840	6.7%	2,280	1.4%
2010	156,810	90.5%	13,560	7.8%	2,470	1.4%
2015	155,870	89.4%	15,500	8.9%	2,550	1.5%
2020	165,710	86.3%	23,370	12.2%	2,410	1.3%
2025	160,730	85.7%	23,900	12.7%	2,340	1.2%
2026	158,750	85.6%	23,840	12.9%	2,340	1.3%

As of 2026, the percentage of residents in Choa Chu Kang residing in HDB flats (85.6%) is considerably higher than the national proportion of HDB dwellers (75.5%), reflecting a greater prevalence of public housing in the area.

Among the population, 75,510 residents, or 40.7% of the population, live in 4-Room Flats, making it the most common type of dwelling.

According to the 2025 General Household Survey, the average household size in Choa Chu Kang is approximately 3.26, higher than the national average of 3.1. Among the 62,900 households in Choa Chu Kang, the most common household size is three persons, representing 25.4% of total households. This is followed by a household size of four persons, representing 23.1% of all households.

Choa Chu Kang has a home ownership rate of 95.2% as of 2025. This is higher than the national home ownership rate of 91.2%, making Choa Chu Kang the fourth-highest in home ownership rate among all planning areas in Singapore. Among the 62,900 households in Choa Chu Kang, the most common household size is three persons, representing 25.4% of total households.

=== Ethnicity ===
Ethnic groups in Choa Chu Kang (2000−2025)
Year	Chinese		Malays		Indians		Others	
Year	Pop.	Percentage	Pop.	Percentage	Pop.	Percentage	Pop.	Percentage
2000	101,259	74.02%	25,527	18.66%	9,161	6.7%	861	0.63%
2010	123,702	71.38%	29,180	16.84%	15,749	9.09%	4,660	2.69%
2015	123,450	70.81%	29,630	17%	16,470	9.45%	4,790	2.75%
2020	133,520	69.52%	35,500	18.48%	18,020	9.38%	5,020	2.61%
2025	127,020	67.7%	36,010	19.2%	19,140	10.2%	5,380	2.9%

As of 2025, Choa Chu Kang has a higher level of ethnic diversity as compared to the national average. This is due to the considerably lower proportion of Chinese residents (67.7%) and a higher proportion of Malay residents (19.2%) compared to the national average of 73.9% and 13.5% respectively.

=== Religion ===
Religious affiliation in Choa Chu Kang (2025 est.)
1. Buddhism (31.2%)
2. No religion (21.8%)
3. Islam (19.9%)
4. Christianity (12.6%)
5. Taoism (7.80%)
6. Hinduism (6.60%)
7. Sikhism (0.10%)

Consistent with the rest of Singapore, the largest religion in Choa Chu Kang is Buddhism, with 52,400 practising residents (31.25% of the population). The second most common group consists of residents with no religion, with 36,600 residents (21.82%), followed by those practising Islam (33,300 residents, 19.86%). Christianity is practised by 21,100 residents (12.58%), including 8,400 Catholics (5.01%). Other religious affiliations include Taoism and other Chinese religions (13,000 residents, 7.75%), Hinduism (11,000 residents, 6.56%), and Sikhism (200 residents, 0.12%).

Compared to the national average of 14.99%, there is a substantially higher proportion of residents practising Islam in Choa Chu Kang.

=== Education ===
As of 2025, 98.5% of the population aged above 15 is literate, similar to the national average of 98.6%.

76.7% of residents are literate in two languages, with the most common language pair being English and Chinese (50.9%). 5.7% of Choa Chu Kang residents are literate in three or more languages.

Highest qualification attained of non-student resident population aged 15 years and over (2025 est.)
Qualification	Percentage	Singapore average
Below secondary	16.6%	19.9%
Secondary	15.6%	14.6%
Post-secondary (non-tertiary)	12.5%	11.1%
Polytechnic diploma	12.7%	10.2%
Professional qualification and other diploma	7.7%	7.5%
University	34.9%	36.7%

As of 2025, the proportion of residents in Choa Chu Kang with a university qualification (34.9%) is slightly below the national average.

=== Language ===
Languages most frequently spoken at home, Choa Chu Kang (2025 est.)
Languages	percent
English	55.6%
Mandarin Chinese	26.9%
Malay	9.4%
Non-Mandarin varieties	3.9%
Tamil	3.0%
Others	0.88%
Other Indian languages	0.41%

In Choa Chu Kang, the proportion of residents using English as the most frequently spoken language, 55.57%, is slightly lower than the national average of 58.1%. Of the 5,800 Indian language speakers, the majority speak Tamil (5,100 residents, 3.0%), representing 87.9% of all Indian language speakers.

=== Employment and income ===
According to the 2025 General Household Survey, 110,900 of residents aged 15 years and over in Choa Chu Kang are employed, out of the 114,900 in the labour force. This equates to an employment rate of 96.5%, slightly lower than the national average of 96.7%. The remaining 52,700 residents (31.4%) aged above 15 in Choa Chu Kang are outside the labour force.

Gross monthly employment income of employed residents aged 15 years and over (2025 est.)
Employment income	Percentage	Singapore average
Below S$1,000	4.3%	3.9%
S$1,000–S$1,999	9.0%	9.4%
S$2,000–S$2,999	9.1%	9.5%
S$3,000–S$3,999	10.1%	10.3%
S$4,000–S$4,999	10.5%	8.8%
S$5,000–S$5,999	9.6%	8.2%
S$6,000–S$6,999	7.8%	6.9%
S$7,000–S$7,999	6.9%	5.9%
S$8,000–S$8,999	6.0%	5.2%
S$9,000–S$9,999	5.1%	4.5%
S$10,000–S$10,999	4.0%	4.3%
S$11,000–S$11,999	2.9%	3.5%
S$12,000–S$14,999	6.8%	7.3%
S$15,000–S$19,999	4.7%	5.8%
S$20,000 and over	3.2%	6.7%

Monthly household employment income (2025 est.)
Household employment income	Percentage	Singapore average
No employed person	11.8%	14.2%
Below S$1,000	1.1%	1.2%
S$1,000–S$1,999	2.9%	3.4%
S$2,000–S$2,999	3.2%	3.7%
S$3,000–S$3,999	3.5%	4.2%
S$4,000–S$4,999	3.0%	3.7%
S$5,000–S$5,999	3.8%	4.1%
S$6,000–S$6,999	4.3%	4.0%
S$7,000–S$7,999	4.6%	3.6%
S$8,000–S$8,999	3.2%	3.8%
S$9,000–S$9,999	4.1%	3.7%
S$10,000–S$10,999	4.3%	3.8%
S$11,000–S$11,999	4.0%	3.7%
S$12,000–S$12,999	4.1%	3.5%
S$13,000–S$13,999	3.7%	3.2%
S$14,000–S$14,999	4.0%	2.8%
S$15,000–S$17,499	7.5%	6.2%
S$17,500–S$19,999	5.4%	5.5%
S$20,000–S$24,999	9.2%	8.0%
S$25,000–S$29,999	5.6%	5.0%
S$30,000–S$34,999	3.2%	3.3%
S$35,000 and over	3.7%	5.5%

== Politics ==
When Choa Chu Kang Town was developed by expanding Teck Whye Estate near the other end of Choa Chu Kang Road at its junction with Upper Bukit Timah Road and Woodlands Road to the north, the place name began to be applied to a much larger area, especially when political divisions like the Choa Chu Kang ward applied to the entire northwest sector of the country during some editions of the Parliamentary elections. Likewise, the residents' committees in Choa Chu Kang were expanded in 1988 and 1991, and part of the Choa Chu Kang sector gave way to the Yew Tee division, followed by the Keat Hong division in 2001. The growing demand of Keat Hong Neighbourhood 8 also requested for the redrawing of boundaries whereby Limbang ward took over the parts of Yew Tee and Choa Chu Kang, aligning more closely with Neighbourhoods 5 and 6. Today, the Yew Tee and Limbang wards fall within the Marsiling-Yew Tee Group Representation Constituency and the rest of the town such as Keat Hong and Choa Chu Kang fall within the Chua Chu Kang Group Representation Constituency.

In 2020, with the further growth of Keat Hong Neighbourhood 8 and Tengah New Town, the Brickland ward was introduced, taking over parts of Keat Hong, Bukit Gombak, Choa Chu Kang and Nanyang.

== Education ==
Choa Chu Kang has eight primary schools, six secondary schools, two post-secondary institutions and a single special education school as of 2022.

=== Primary schools ===
- Chua Chu Kang Primary School
- Concord Primary School
- De La Salle School
- Kranji Primary School
- South View Primary School
- Teck Whye Primary School
- Unity Primary School
- Yew Tee Primary School

=== Secondary schools ===
- Bukit Panjang Government High School
- Chua Chu Kang Secondary School
- Kranji Secondary School
- Regent Secondary School
- Unity Secondary School

=== Tertiary institutions ===
- ITE College West
- Jurong Pioneer Junior College

=== Other schools ===
- APSN Delta Senior School
- ACS Academy

== Transportation facilities ==
City planners plan for public transport to eventually become the preferred mode of transport in the future. The government of Singapore ideally desires environmental towns, using public transport to reduce pollution caused by heavy road traffic. Choa Chu Kang is part of the Urban Redevelopment Authority's focus for realising this urban planning model. As Choa Chu Kang is relatively distant from the city centre at the Central Area, an efficient, high-volume and high-speed public transport system is also preferred over road networks.

Choa Chu Kang MRT/LRT station and Choa Chu Kang Bus Interchange are connected in the town centre, allowing travel for the residents of Choa Chu Kang New Town across the different available modes of public transport.

=== Public transport ===
==== Rail ====
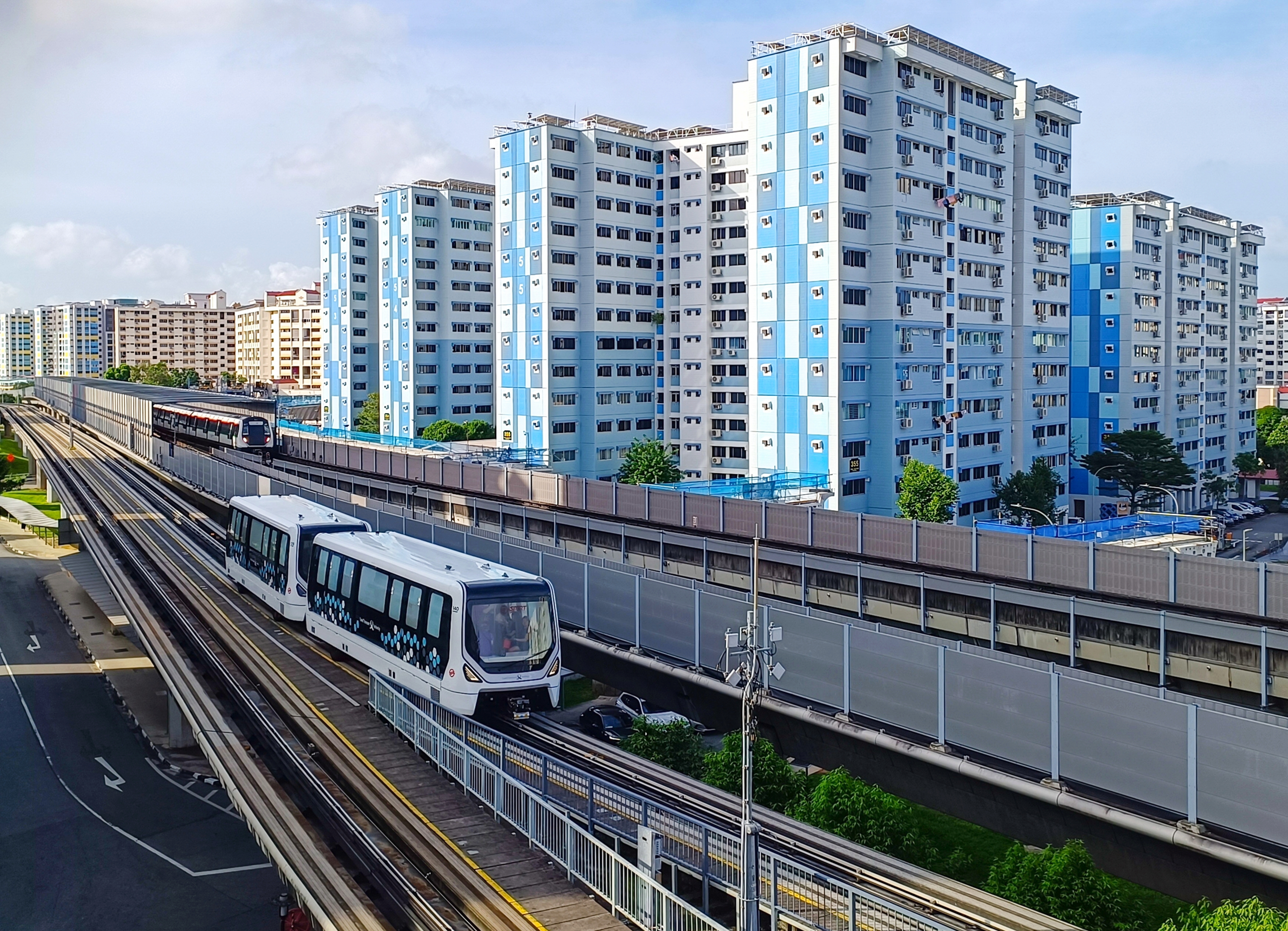
LRT system (front) and MRT system (back)

Choa Chu Kang New Town is linked to the Central Area and to the other lines on the MRT/LRT system (to the East West Line at Jurong East station, to the Thomson-East Coast line at Woodlands station, to the Circle line at Bishan station, to the Downtown line (DTL) at Newton station and the North East line at Dhoby Ghaut station) through the North–South Line (NSL) at Choa Chu Kang station (NS4) located at Choa Chu Kang Town Centre. It usually takes an hour for passengers to travel from Choa Chu Kang to the Central Area which changes at Jurong East.

The intra-town Bukit Panjang LRT is a 7.8 km light rail line that serves to link residents to the town centre and the nearby town of Bukit Panjang, hence the line's name. It is a fully driverless system. The Bukit Panjang LRT also provides a connection with other bus services, together with the Downtown Line at Bukit Panjang MRT/LRT station (BP6/DT1) for a faster and more direct route towards Bukit Timah Road and the Central Business District.

Yew Tee station (NS5), the other station along NSL in Choa Chu Kang New Town, serves the housing developments in Yew Tee, the industrial estate of Sungei Kadut, and the northern part of Choa Chu Kang New Town. The station started operations on 10 February 1996. Like Choa Chu Kang, it usually takes an hour for passengers to travel from Yew Tee to the Central Area when using the station which changes at Jurong East.

The future Jurong Region Line (JRL) will terminate at Choa Chu Kang station, and provide another station along Choa Chu Kang Avenue 3. The JRL (West) will connect to Tengah New Town, Jurong West New Town including the East-West Line at Boon Lay MRT Station, Jurong Industrial Estate and Nanyang Technological University, from 2028 onwards.

The future DE1 station on the Downtown Line under the DTL2 Extension, will be located in Sungei Kadut South, adjacent and connected to Yew Tee via an extension of Choa Chu Kang North 7 and a pedestrian overhead bridge. This station is targeted for a 2035 opening and will provide residents in Yew Tee a quicker access to the Downtown Line than Bukit Panjang MRT.

The future NS3A station on the North-South Line will be located near the junction of Bukit Batok Road and Bukit Batok West Avenue 5, adjacent to Brickland Road. Scheduled to open in 2034, the station will provide residents of Keat Hong and Choa Chu Kang Neighbourhoods 4 and 8 with quicker access to the North-South Line.

==== Bus services ====
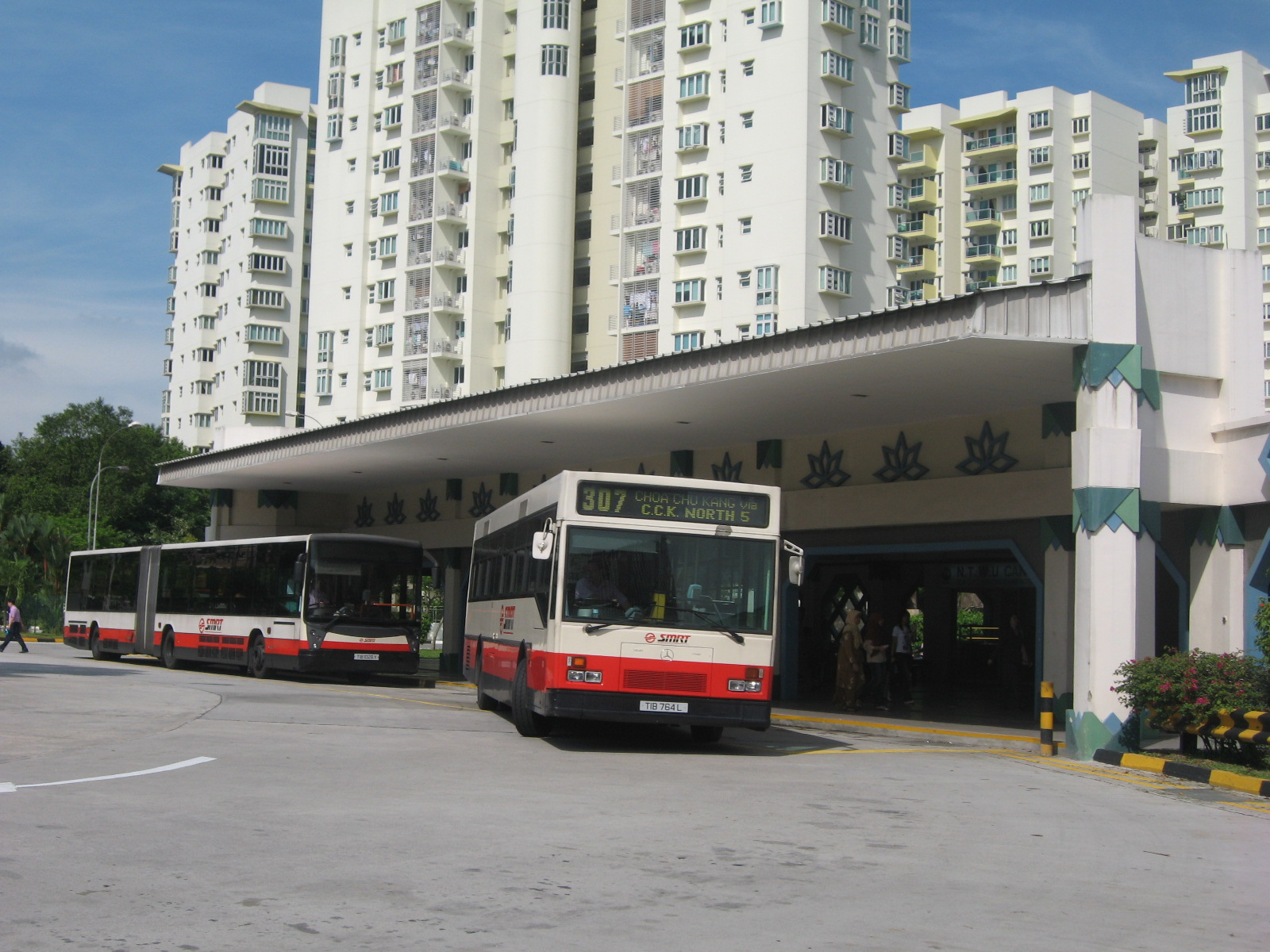
The old Choa Chu Kang Bus Interchange, which ceased operations in 2018

The new Choa Chu Kang interchange which begins operations in 2018

Bus services are available at the Choa Chu Kang Bus Interchange which is connected to the Choa Chu Kang MRT/LRT station and the town's central shopping mall Lot One Shoppers' Mall. It was opened in 1990 with 12 bus services under SBS Transit and at their own Choa Chu Kang Bus Package, all handed over to SMRT Buses in 1999. On 16 December 2018, the interchange was relocated to a new facility at the junction of Choa Chu Kang Way and Choa Chu Kang Loop, with the old interchange being demolished due to the construction of the Jurong Region Line. All services were amended to the new interchange on that day.

The bus interchange currently has 16 services; 14 are public bus services (mostly operated by SMRT Buses, a special free shuttle to Qian Hu Fish Farm, and another special free shuttle to Gain City Megastore @ Sungei Kadut.

Bus services were introduced over the years in Choa Chu Kang.

Passing-through bus services include buses 455, 974, 975, 979 from Bukit Panjang Bus Interchange and 984 from Jurong Town Hall Bus Interchange. Other buses along Bukit Batok Road, Choa Chu Kang Road and Woodlands Road, such as 75, 160, 178, 180, 184, 187, 960, 961, 961M skirt the outer edges of the Choa Chu Kang New Town.

Notably, buses 172 and 975 provide connections from Choa Chu Kang MRT/LRT station to the north-western most part of Singapore via Old Choa Chu Kang Road, Jalan Bahar and Lim Chu Kang Road, where a variety of military institutions and cemeteries are located. From Choa Chu Kang Bus Interchange, 925 provides the sole connection to the Sungei Kadut industrial area along Sungei Kadut Street 1, as well as Kranji Reservoir Park. Similarly, 927 provides the sole connection to the western section of Mandai Road before entering the Mandai Wildlife Reserve attractions such as the Singapore Zoo, Night Safari, Bird Paradise and River Wonders. Bus service 307 is a dual loop service, with the northern loop at the neighbourhood centre of Yew Tee, and the southern loop at Teck Whye Lane. All 307 services except terminating services make continuous loops around both looping points, connecting

- the two neighbourhood centres, Yew Tee and Teck Whye
- Choa Chu Kang Town Centre, including Choa Chu Kang MRT/LRT, Bus Interchange, Choa Chu Kang Centre and Lot One
- schools along Choa Chu Kang North 6, Choa Chu Kang Central and Teck Whye Crescent
- sports and recreational facilities such as Choa Chu Kang Stadium, Choa Chu Kang Park and SAFRA, Limbang Park, Pang Sua Park Connector
- Community Centres in Teck Whye (Choa Chu Kang Community Centre) and Choa Chu Kang Central (Keat Hong Community Centre)
- Healthcare facilities such as Choa Chu Kang Polyclinic
- Places of Worship in Teck Whye

==== Road network ====
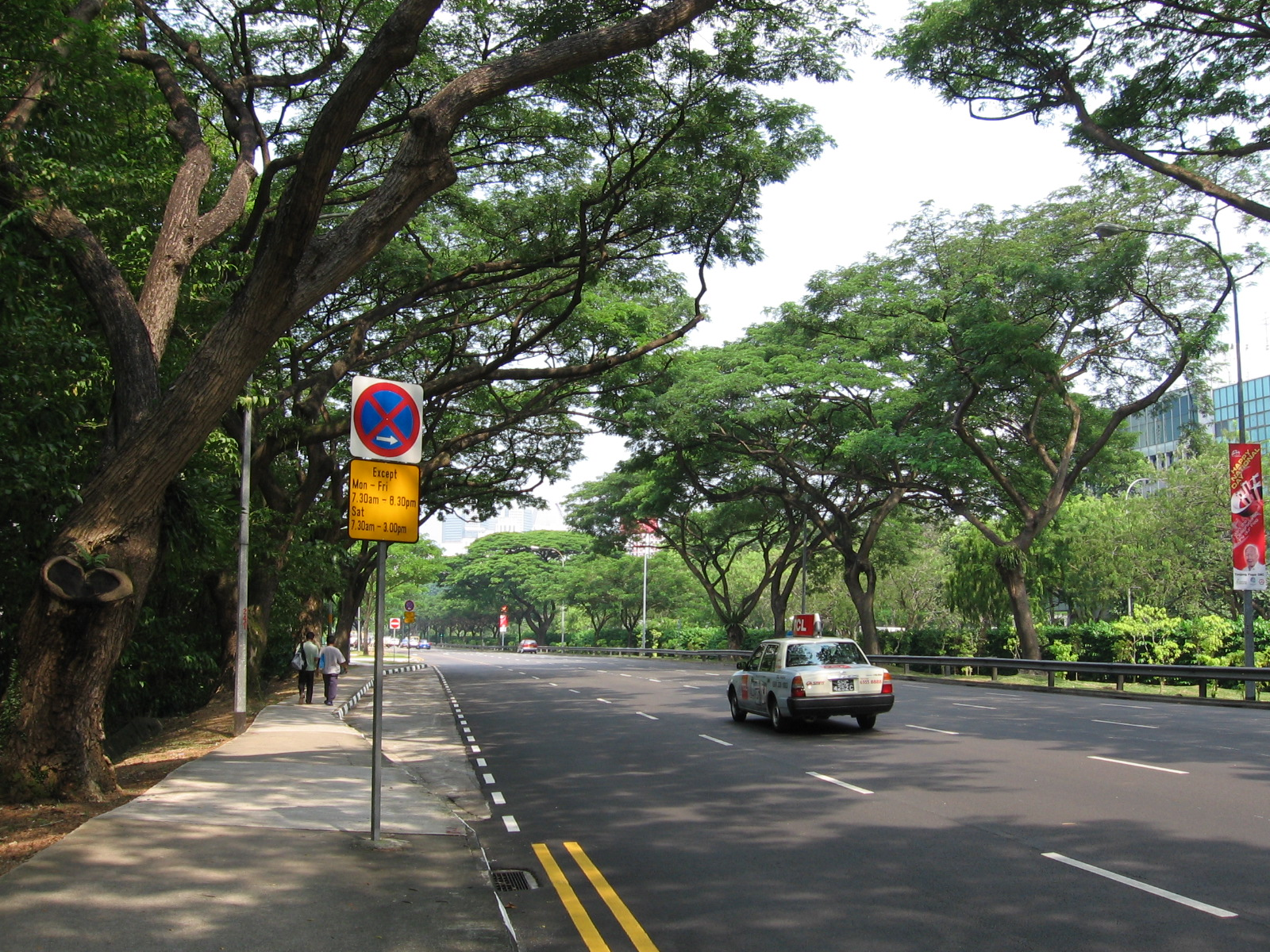
The northern part of the much-used Bukit Timah Road (called Upper Bukit Timah Road) connects Choa Chu Kang residents to other parts of the country.

The Kranji Expressway (KJE) links Choa Chu Kang Town up with Singapore's expressway network. With the KJE, drivers can change onto the Bukit Timah Expressway (BKE) which in turn, is connected to the Pan-Island Expressway (PIE) which travels to the Central Area and the eastern parts of Singapore. As the town is surrounded by the towns of Bukit Panjang, Bukit Batok, Bukit Gombak and southern Woodlands, many roads (old and new) have been constructed to link Choa Chu Kang into other towns which eventually allows residents to other parts of the country by either bus, train, car or any other reliable means of transportation.

The following roads connect the central town of Choa Chu Kang to the nearby towns of Bukit Batok and Bukit Panjang:

- Bukit Batok Road (links Choa Chu Kang with Bukit Batok and Jurong East)
- Choa Chu Kang Road
- Upper Bukit Timah Road (northern section connects with Choa Chu Kang Road)
- Teck Whye Lane
- Bukit Panjang Road
- Brickland Road
- Woodlands Road

The following roads connect the central town of Choa Chu Kang to its northern counterpart neighbourhood, Yew Tee:

- Choa Chu Kang Way
- Choa Chu Kang Drive (parallel to the track between Choa Chu Kang and Yew Tee MRT stations)

As per the Urban Redevelopment Authority Master Plan 2025, Choa Chu Kang Drive will be extended northwards across Pang Sua Canal into Sungei Kadut while Choa Chu Kang North 7 will be extended eastwards across Pang Sua Canal to Woodlands Road.

== Amenities ==
=== Commercial ===
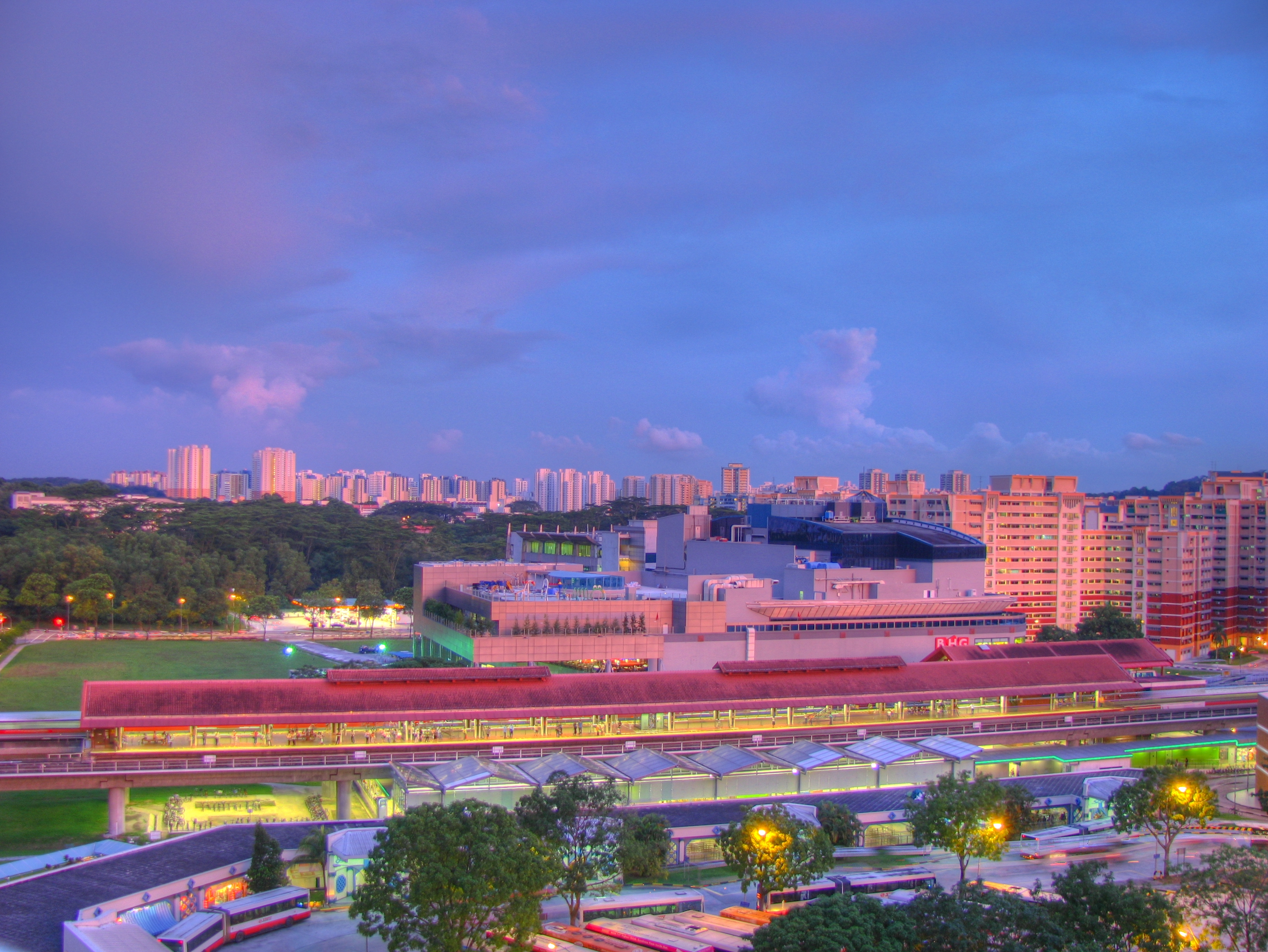
Choa Chu Kang MRT/LRT station with Lot One shopping mall in the background

There are several main shopping centres in Choa Chu Kang. Lot One is a shopping mall located next to Choa Chu Kang MRT station and is owned by CapitaLand, serving as a major hub in Choa Chu Kang. Its anchor tenants are NTUC FairPrice, Shaw Theatres, Cotton On, Popular Bookstore and the Choa Chu Kang Community Library.

Yew Tee Point is located in Yew Tee, managed by Wellspring Holdings Pte Ltd. The mall has undergone enhancement works to create a four-storey retail extension block measuring over 16,500 sq ft (1,530 m2). The works, which commenced in July 2007, was completed by end-2008. NTUC FairPrice and Koufu serve as its anchor tenants.

As for Junction 10, it is a shopping mall by Far East Organisation, located along the boundaries of Choa Chu Kang and Bukit Panjang. Formerly known as Ten Mile Junction, the mall was upgraded and renamed to Junction 10 in 2011, reopening as a mixed-use development with a condominium, The Tennery, located on its upper floors. The mall houses Mindchamps Preschool, Fitness First and Sheng Siong as its anchor tenants.

The other shopping centres are smaller-scale neighbourhood malls at the town centre or neighbourhood centres. These are Choa Chu Kang Centre, Keat Hong Shopping Centre, Limbang Shopping Centre, Sunshine Place, Teck Whye Shopping Centre and Yew Tee Square.

The Heart of Yew Tee project also contains retail outlets and the town's first hawker centre, to be completed by early 2027. Upon completion of the Jurong Region Line, a second hawker centre will also be built at the Choa Chu Kang Town Centre, along with a pedestrian mall and a town plaza.

=== Healthcare ===
The estate contains a polyclinic, Choa Chu Kang Polyclinic. Built in 1997, the polyclinic underwent major renovation works in 2010 to incorporate more environmentally and elderly-friendly features. It is operated by the National University Polyclinics. A new polyclinic is also slated to be a part of the Heart of Yew Tee project. The project will also include a kidney dialysis centre.

There is also a Family Medicine Clinic, (FMC), Keat Hong FMC, a collaboration between the National University Health System (NUHS) and Trilink Healthcare Pte Ltd. It opened in 2017 and it located within Keat Hong Community Club.

NUH also has a Children's Urgent Care Clinic location in Junction 10.

Based on the URA Masterplan 2025, a large plot of land bounded by Choa Chu Kang Grove, Choa Chu Kang Avenue 7, Brickland Road and Bukit Batok Road is also zoned for healthcare and medical use.

=== Parks, recreational and sport venues ===
- Choa Chu Kang Park – a major park of the town located in the northern part of Choa Chu Kang
- Choa Chu Kang Stadium – the town's major stadium which was a practice venue for the 2010 Youth Olympic Games
- Choa Chu Kang Swimming Complex – located adjacent to Choa Chu Kang stadium
- Choa Chu Kang Mega Playground
- Villa Verde Park
- Limbang Park
- Limbang Green Spine

The Pang Sua Canal runs along the northern and eastern edge of Choa Chu Kang New Town. The Pang Sua Park Connector follows the western edge of the canal of the same name, starting near the southern end of Kranji Park Connector (Kranji Reservoir) and providing an uninterrupted path from the northern edges of Yew Tee, to the eastern edges of Choa Chu Kang Central and Teck Whye, and to Choa Chu Kang Road near Bukit Panjang MRT. The uninterrupted and grade-separated nature encourages its use for commuting, recreational and fitness purposes.

The section of the Rail Corridor between the Choa Chu Kang Road and Stagmont Ring Road has been closed for construction of the Rail Green I and Rail Green II Built-To-Order (BTO) HDB flats between Pang Sua Canal and Woodlands Road.

== Incident ==
On 31 October 2024, an eastern black-and-white colobus monkey named Mykel was spotted by a resident in Villa Verde Park in Choa Chu Kang, months after escaping from the Singapore Zoo. Wildlife Personnel were activated to catch Mykel on 1 November 2024 and it was sent for health inspections at Singapore Zoo Health Checkup facility before returning to the enclosure.

== See also ==
- List of Kangchu system placename etymologies
