= Choa Chu Kang Bus Interchange =

Bus interchange in Singapore

Choa Chu Kang Bus Interchange 蔡厝港巴士转换站 Pusat Pertukaran Bas Choa Chu Kang
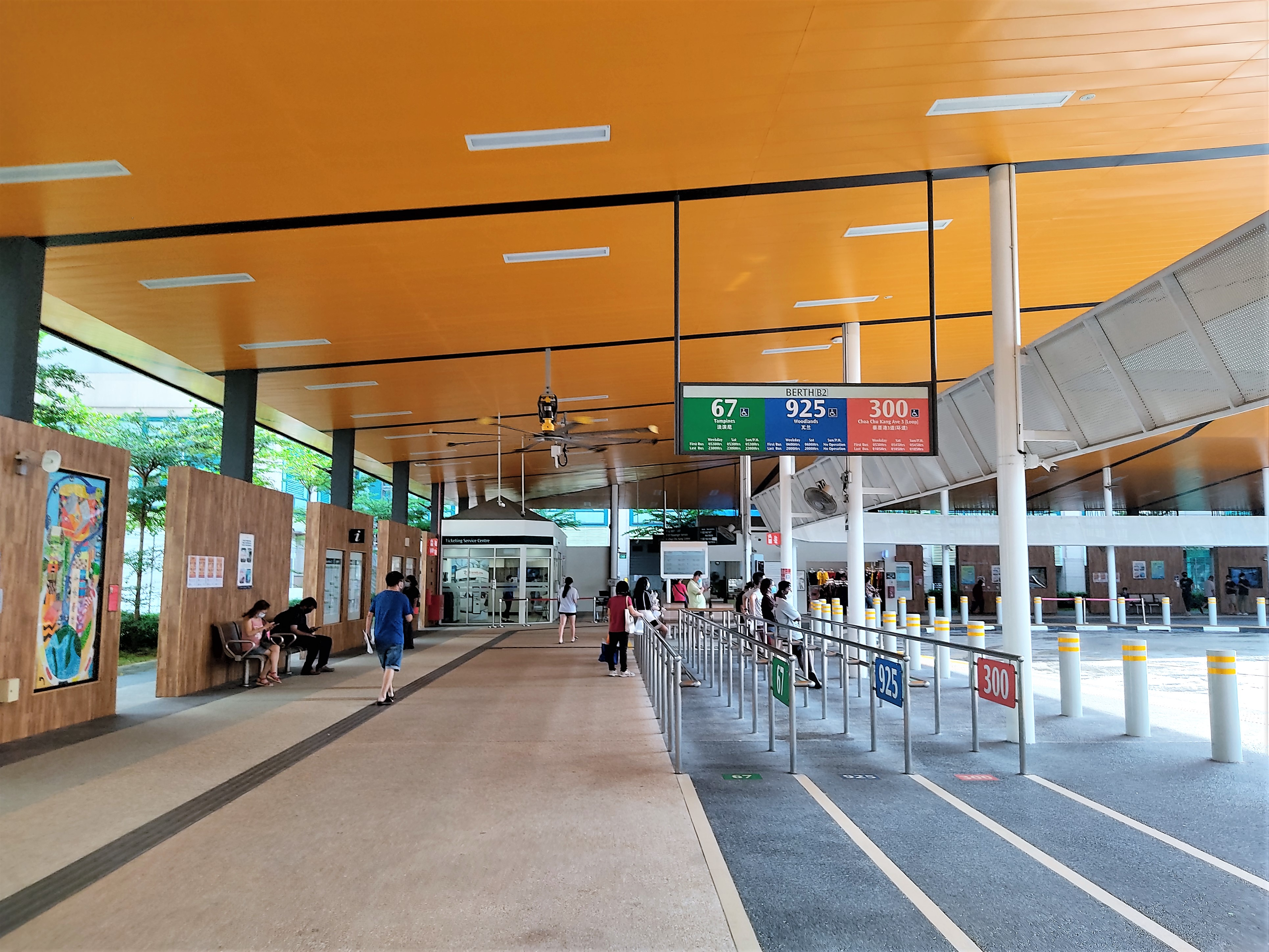
- Internal view of the new Choa Chu Kang Bus Interchange.

General information
- Location: 70 Choa Chu Kang Loop, Singapore 689688
- Coordinates: 1°23′8″N 103°44′37″E
- System: Public Bus Interchange
- Owner: Land Transport Authority
- Operator: SMRT Buses
- Bus routes: 16 (SMRT Buses)
- Bus stands: 5 Sawtooth Boarding Berths; 4 Alighting Berths
- Bus operators: SMRT Buses
- Connections: NS4 JS1 BP1 Choa Chu Kang

Construction
- Structure type: At-grade
- Accessible: Accessible alighting/boarding points Accessible public toilets Graduated kerb edges Tactile guidance system

History
- Opened: 8 April 1990; 36 years ago (Old); 16 December 2018; 7 years ago (Existing)
- Closed: 15 December 2018; 7 years ago (Old)

Key dates
- 8 April 1990: Commenced operations
- 16 December 2018: Operations transferred to new site
Location

Choa Chu Kang Bus Interchange is a bus interchange which mainly serves the residential neighbourhood of Choa Chu Kang in the West Region of Singapore. It is located at Choa Chu Kang Loop and connected to Choa Chu Kang MRT/LRT station and the Lot One Shoppers' Mall. Opened in 1990, the old bus interchange was one of the oldest surviving bus interchanges in Singapore to remain intact from re-modification while still in service for 28 years until 15 December 2018. The new site opened on 16 December 2018.

== History ==
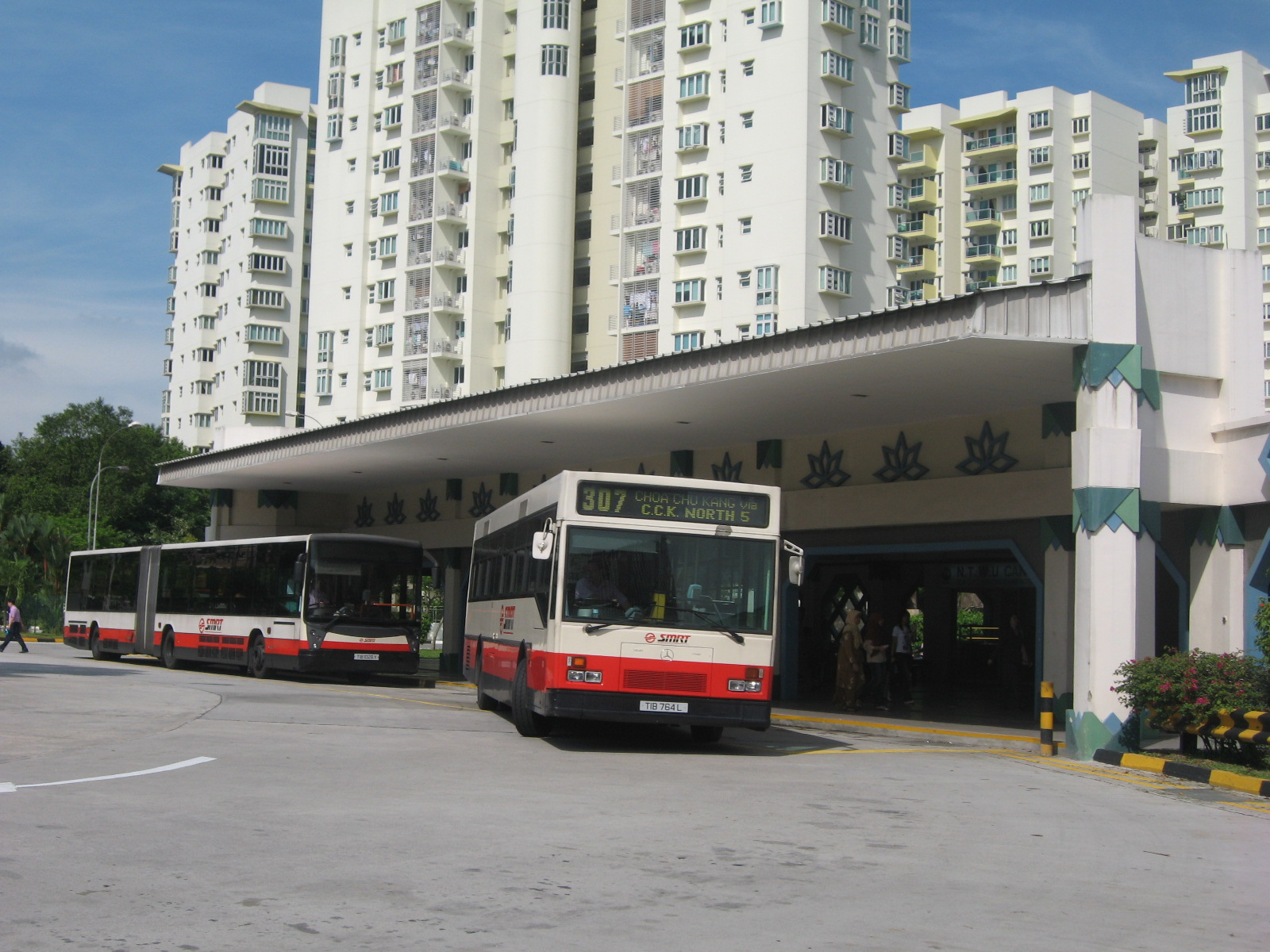
The older Choa Chu Kang Bus Interchange operated by SMRT Buses in 2006.

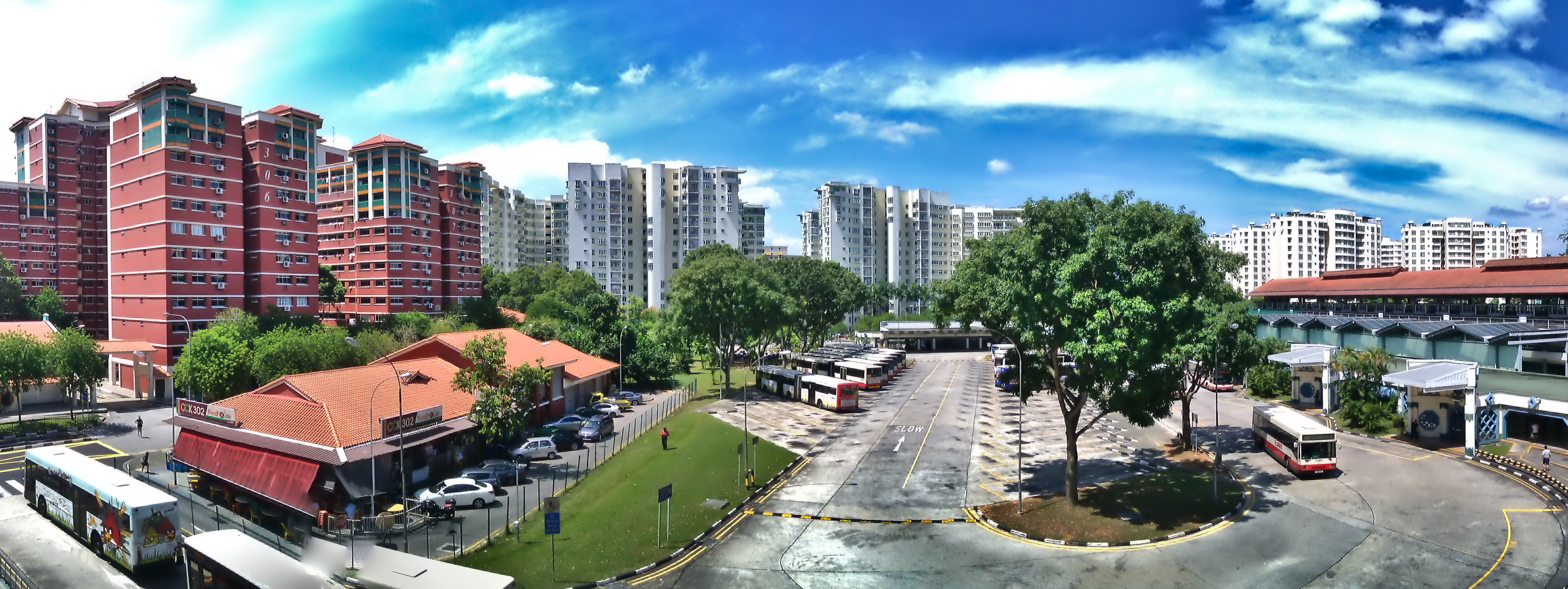
The old bus interchange.

Choa Chu Kang used to have a roadside bus terminal along Choa Chu Kang Way. It was later replaced by a bus interchange built beside the MRT station. It was opened on 8 April 1990 and remained operational until 15 December 2018 with little modifications. The old bus interchange was demolished to make way for the Jurong Region Line's Choa Chu Kang station.

Trans-Island Bus Services also had the operating base for Choa Chu Kang since 1990, where bus service SS7 was introduced from Choa Chu Kang to Woodlands, and on 10 March 1996, bus services 925 and 927 were extended to Choa Chu Kang. In 1995, all bus services (175, 185, 188, 190, 300, 302, and 307) with the exception of service 67 were drawn under Choa Chu Kang Bus Package, whereas they were handed over between 25 July 1999 and 26 December 1999, however service 67 was transferred from Tampines Bus Package and 172 was transferred from Jurong West Bus Package on 26 December 1999.

A new interchange was built near Lot One and opened on 16 December 2018. Prior to its opening, service 308 was merged into service 991 to enhance connectivity between Choa Chu Kang and Bukit Batok. At the same time, service 974 was introduced to provide a direct link to Joo Koon, helping to ease congestion on services 172 and 180, as well as on the East-West and North-South MRT lines.

== Future ==
Plans for an upcoming Integrated Transport Hub at Choa Chu Kang Interchange are currently underway.

== Bus contracting model ==
Under the bus contracting model, all bus services operating from Choa Chu Kang Bus Interchange were divided into two bus packages, operated by the anchor operator, SMRT Buses.

=== List of bus services ===
Operator	Package	Routes
SMRT Buses	Choa Chu Kang-Bukit Panjang	67, 172, 188, 188e, 190, 190A, 300, 301, 302, 307, 307A, 927, 976, 983, 983A, 985, 991, 991B
SMRT Buses	Woodlands	925
