= ITE College West =

Public school in Singapore

- 工艺西区教育学院 (Chinese); Institut Pendidikan Teknikal Kolej Barat (Malay)

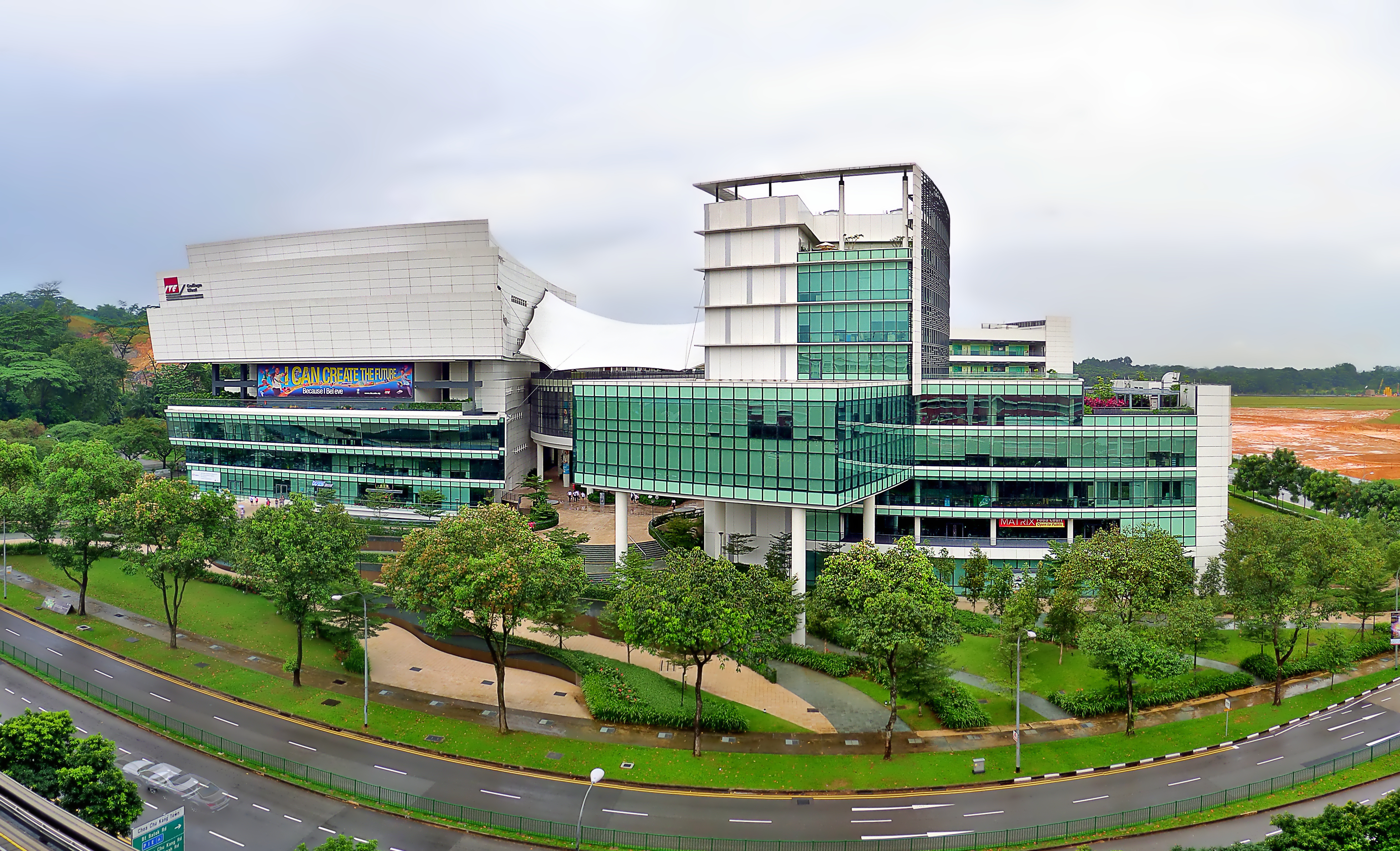
- ITE College West

Location
- 1 Choa Chu Kang Grove, Singapore 688236

Information
- Type: Public; Government
- Motto: A College of Service and Innovation
- Established: July 2010; 16 years ago
- School board: Institute of Technical Education
- Principal: Alice Seow Chui Hoon
- Website: Official website
- ITE College West

Agency overview
- Jurisdiction: Government of Singapore
- Parent agency: Ministry of Education

Chinese name
- Traditional Chinese: 工藝西區教育學院
- Simplified Chinese: 工艺西区教育学院
Transcriptions
Standard Mandarin
- Hanyu Pinyin: Gōngyì Xīqū Jiàoyù Xuéyuàn
Southern Min
- Hokkien POJ: Kang-gē Se-khu Kàu-io̍k Ha̍k-īⁿ

ITE College West (ITECW) is a post-secondary education institution and statutory board under the purview of the Ministry of Education in Singapore.

It is one of the Institute of Technical Education's three colleges under the "One ITE System, Three Colleges" Governance and Education Model.

== Campus ==
In July 2010, a 9.54-hectare mega-campus was opened, operating four schools - the School of Business and Services, School of Hospitality, School of Engineering and School of Info-Comm Technology.

The campus, which was built by Gammon Construction under a PPP contract, was officially opened on 18 April 2011 by Prime Minister Lee Hsien Loong.

== Activities ==
Students can participate in many co-curricular activities (CCA) organised by Clubs, Committees, and community service societies. Actively contributing in the CCA can help to attain a 'CCA bonus point' of 0.2, 0.15, 0.1 and 0.05 respectively, where it can help ITE graduates who are progressing to ITE Higher Nitec or Polytechnic diploma courses.

== Notable alumni ==
- Jeremy Chan – Actor of MediaCorp
- Hayley Woo – Actress of MediaCorp
- Jayley Woo – Actress of MediaCorp
- Sean Tan – Professional wrestler signed to WWE
- Cheris Lee – Actress, dancer & singer.
- Kiki Lim – Actress of MediaCorp
