= ERA APAC Centre =

Building in Singapore

Coordinates: 1°19′54.0″N 103°50′57.8″E

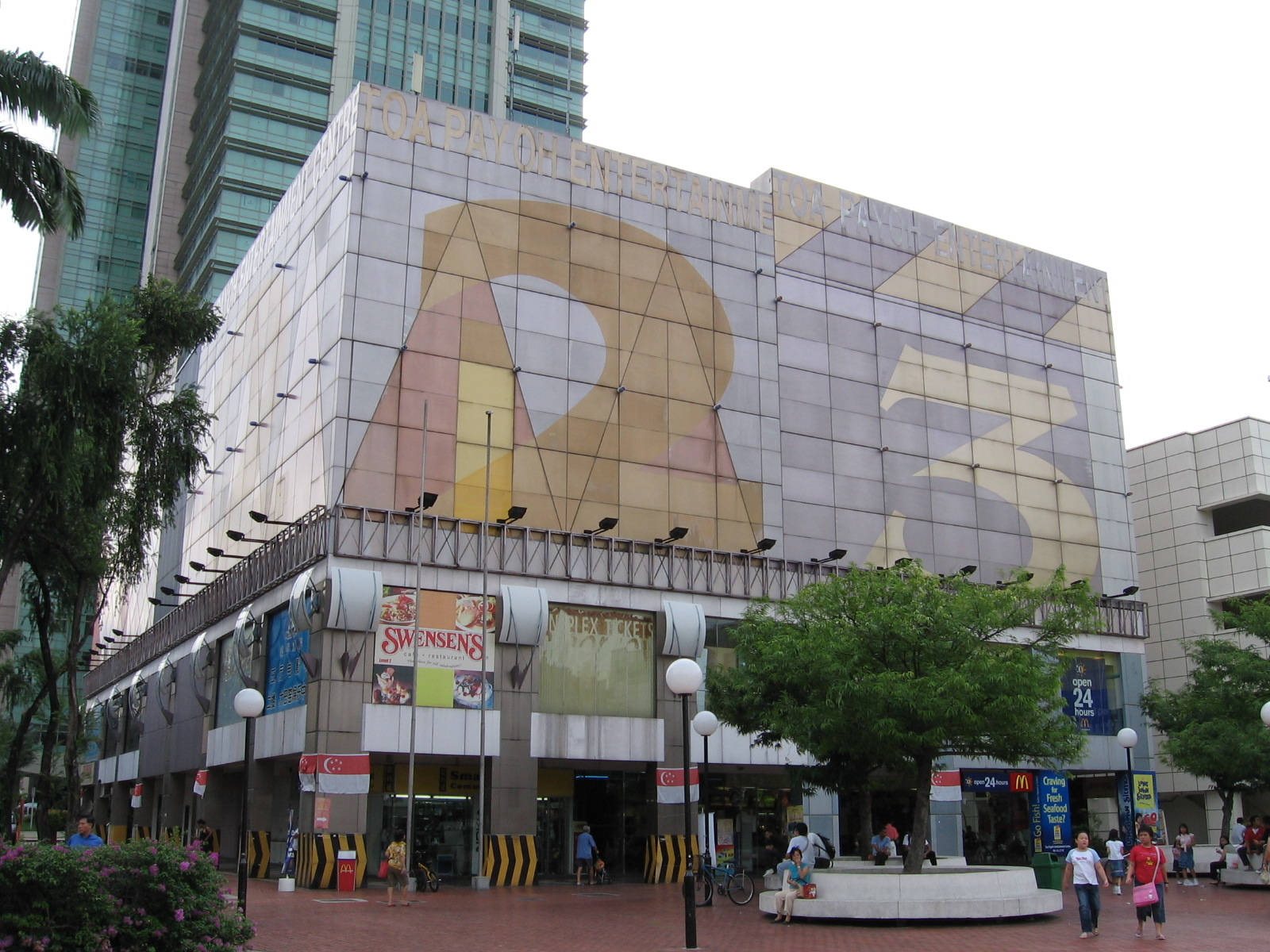
- Toa Payoh Entertainment Centre (currently ERA APAC Centre) in 2006

- Location within Singapore
- Former names: Toa Payoh Theatre; Toa Payoh Entertainment Centre; ERA Centre; Hersing Centre

General information
- Status: Completed
- Location: Toa Payoh, Singapore, 450 Lorong 6 Toa Payoh, Singapore 319394, Singapore
- Named for: ERA Realty Network Pte Ltd; APAC Realty Ltd
- Construction started: 1971; 55 years ago
- Opened: May 1972; 54 years ago
- Owner: Eng Wah Organisation (former); Hersing Corporation Pte Ltd (former); APAC Realty

Technical details
- Floor count: 4

Design and construction
- Known for: One of the two former movie theatres in Toa Payoh, Singapore

Other information
- Number of stores: 20

ERA APAC Centre, formerly known as Toa Payoh Theatre, Toa Payoh Entertainment Centre, Hersing Centre, ERA Centre, is a mixed-use development complex and former entertainment centre in Singapore. It is located near Toa Payoh Bus Interchange and Toa Payoh MRT station, beside HDB Hub and Orange Tee Building.

== History ==
Toa Payoh Theatre was one of two cinemas opened for Toa Payoh HDB estate by Eng Wah Organisation in the 1970s, the other being the Kong Chian Cinema which was located near the Toa Payoh Branch Library.

It was then being upgraded to the Toa Payoh Entertainment Centre in November 1997 to serve as a leisure space for Toa Payoh residents. The entertainment centre contained three levels, with food restaurants, arcades and Eng Wah ticketing booths occupying the first two levels.

== Redevelopment ==
On 9 December 2010, the cinema ceased operation together with another Eng Wah's Jubilee Entertainment Centre and was later renovated and converted into a simple shopping mall while the former cinema halls became a large, joint row of shops.

In February 2011, Eng Wah sold the entertainment centre to Hersing Pte Ltd for $66 million, and it was subsequently renamed as ERA Centre.

The centre was once again renamed as the Hersing Centre, before it was put up on sale again on 2 November 2015, with an indicative price around S$78 million.

In 2018, the centre was acquired by a real estate brokerage APAC Realty under the ERA for S$72.8 million and renamed again as ERA APAC Centre, to serve as ERA Asia Pacific's new headquarters. Space not used by ERA was leased to other retail stores.
