= List of commercial sites in Singapore =

This is a list of commercial sites in Singapore.

== Street-side areas ==
- Boat Quay
- Bugis Village
- Clarke Quay
- Jalan Kayu
- Peranakan Place

== Shopping malls ==
Full article: List of shopping malls in Singapore

== Housing estate commercial areas ==
=== Ang Mo Kio ===
- Ang Mo Kio Town Centre
- Cheng San Centre
- Chong Boon Centre
- Kebun Baru Mall
- Teck Ghee Square

=== Bedok ===
- Bedok Mall
- Bedok Town Centre

=== Bishan ===
- Bishan Neighbourhood 1 Centre
- Bishan North Shopping Mall
- Bishan Town Centre

=== Bukit Batok ===
- Bukit Batok Town Centre
- Bukit Batok West Shopping Centre
- Gombak Place
- West Mall

=== Bukit Merah ===
- Bukit Merah Town Centre
- Telok Blangah Neighbourhood Centre
- Tiong Bahru Plaza

=== Bukit Panjang ===
- Bukit Panjang Town Centre
- Fajar Neighbourhood Shopping Centre
- Greenridge Shopping Centre

=== Choa Chu Kang ===
- Choa Chu Kang Town Centre
- Keat Hong Shopping Centre
- Limbang Shopping Centre
- Sunshine Place
- Teck Whye Shopping Centre
- Yew Tee Square

=== Clementi ===
- Clementi Town Centre

=== Geylang ===
- Geylang East Central
- Geylang Serai Centre
- Joo Chiat Complex

=== Hougang ===
- Central Place
- Hougang Town Centre
- Hougang Green Shopping Mall
- Kovan City

=== Kallang ===
- Bendemeer Shopping Mall

=== Jurong East ===
- IMM (Singapore)
- Jurong East Neighbourhood 4 Centre
- Jurong Entertainment Centre
- Jurong East Regional Centre
- Yuhua Place
- Yuhua Village

=== Jurong West ===
- Boon Lay Shopping Centre
- Gek Poh Shopping Centre
- Jurong West Town Centre
- Taman Jurong Neighbourhood Shopping Centre
- Jurong Point
- Pioneer Mall

=== Novena ===
- Balestier Hill Shopping Centre

=== Pasir Ris ===
- Elias Mall
- Loyang Point
- Pasir Ris Town Centre
- Pasir Ris West Plaza
- Pasir Ris Neighbourhood 4 Centre
- White Sands Shopping Centre

=== Punggol ===
- Punggol Town Centre
- Punggol Plaza
- Fernvale Point

=== Queenstown ===
- Holland Village
- Mei Ling Heights
- Queenstown Town Centre
- Tanglin Halt Centre

=== Sembawang ===
- Sembawang Town Centre

=== Sengkang ===
- Rivervale Plaza
- Rivervale Mall
- Sengkang Town Centre

=== Serangoon ===
- Serangoon North Neighbourhood Centre
- Serangoon Town Centre

=== Simei ===
- EastPoint Mall

=== Tampines ===
- Tampines Mart
- Tampines Regional Centre
- Century Square
- Tampines Mall

=== Toa Payoh ===
- 600 @ Toa Payoh
- ERA APAC Centre
- Toa Payoh Town Centre

=== Woodlands ===
- 888 Plaza
- Admiralty Place
- Vista Point
- Woodlands Mart
- Woodlands North Plaza
- Woodlands Regional Centre
- Causeway Point

=== Yishun ===
- Chong Pang City
- Nee Soon East Courtyard

=== Other estates ===
- Albert Centre
- Bras Basah Complex
- Changi Village
- Cheng Yan Court
- Chinatown Complex
- Crawford Centre
- Hong Lim Complex
- Kitchener Complex
- Potong Pasir
- Rochor Centre
- Tanjong Pagar Plaza
- Upper Aljunied
- Waterloo Centre
- Zhujiao Centre
