= 600 @ Toa Payoh =

Building in Singapore

Coordinates: 1°20′02.4″N 103°51′03.5″E

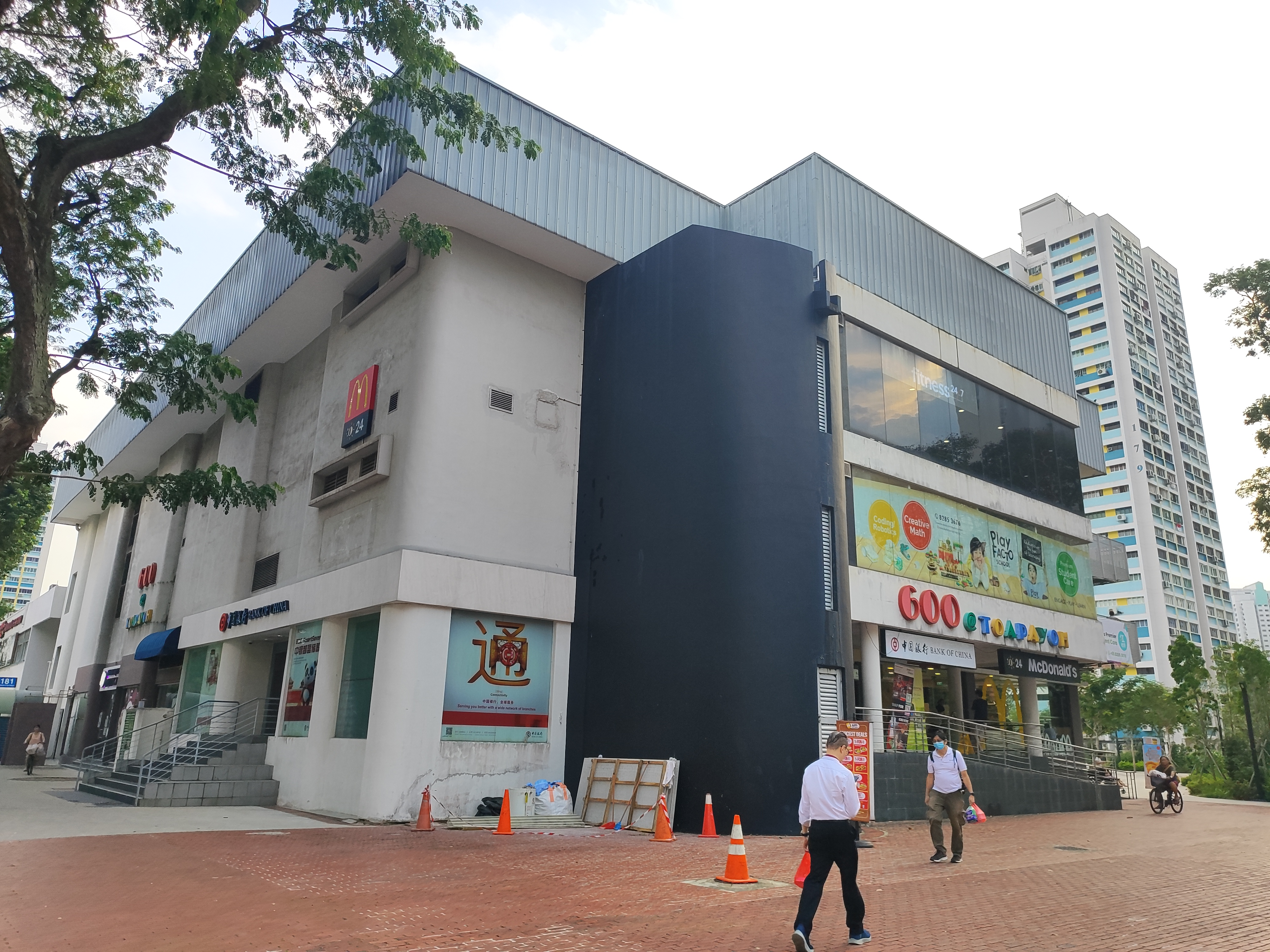
- 600 @ Toa Payoh, formerly Central Cinema and Kong Chian Cinema in 2025

- Location within Singapore
- Former names: Kong Chian Cinema; Central Cinema

General information
- Location: Toa Payoh, Singapore, 600 Lorong 4 Toa Payoh, Singapore 319515, Singapore
- Named for: 600 Lorong 4 Toa Payoh
- Construction started: 1971
- Completed: 1972; 54 years ago
- Opened: 11 May 1972; 54 years ago
- Client: Chong Gay Organization (former); Cathay Organisation (former); Golden Village (former)
- Owner: McDonald's

Technical details
- Floor count: 4
- Lifts/elevators: 1

Design and construction
- Architect: Hor Cheok Foon
- Known for: One of the two former movie theatres in Toa Payoh, Singapore

Other information
- Number of anchors: 3

600 @ Toa Payoh, formerly Central Cinema (中央戏院) and Kong Chian Cinema (光前戏院), is a commercial building and a former cinema in Toa Payoh town centre which was located near the Toa Payoh Library. The building currently houses a pool centre, amenities, eateries and a 24 hours McDonald's fast food restaurant.

== History ==
Kong Chian Cinema was the first of the two cinemas opened for the Toa Payoh HDB estate since 1972, the other one being the Toa Payoh Theatre.

The 1,500 seat cinema was designed by the architect Hor Cheok Foon, it was built and handled by Chiew Kong Chian Association, a Kuala Lumpur-based company, as part of the Toa Payoh development plan initiated by HDB. The cinema was opened on 11 May 1972 with the charity premier of the Hong Kong movie, The Loner (半生牛馬), which helped to raise funds for Chung Hwa Free Hospital in Toa Payoh.

The cinema was then put on operation by the now defunct Chong Gay Organization and had screened various movies from Hollywood, Hong Kong, China, Malaysia, Indonesia and occasionally Indian films.

=== Closure ===
The cinema ceased operation on 31 January 1987 with the last screening of Hong Kong feature film The Legend of Wisely at 9.30pm. The cinema was then acquired by fast food chain McDonald's, which would undergo immediate makeover upon its closure.

=== Reopening ===
The cinema was leased to Cathay Organisation and reopened 6 months later as the Central Cinema with the screening of the movie Superman IV: The Quest for Peace on 28 July 1987, the cinema screened mostly Hong Kong films and occasionally English films.

In the mid-1990s, Golden Village took over the management of the Central Cinema, providing Toa Payoh residents with the latest films distributed by Golden Village.

== Closure and redevelopment ==
Central Cinema ceased operation with the last screening of an award-winning feature film, The Soong Sisters on 28 June 1997 at 12am. The cinema had been converted to a multi-purpose hall for live performances, before undergoing another round of renovation into a commercial building and renamed as 600 @ Toa Payoh.

The building currently houses a pool centre, amenities and eateries as well as having the McDonald's first 24-hour fast food restaurant in Singapore.
