= Ang Mo Kio Library =

Public library in Singapore

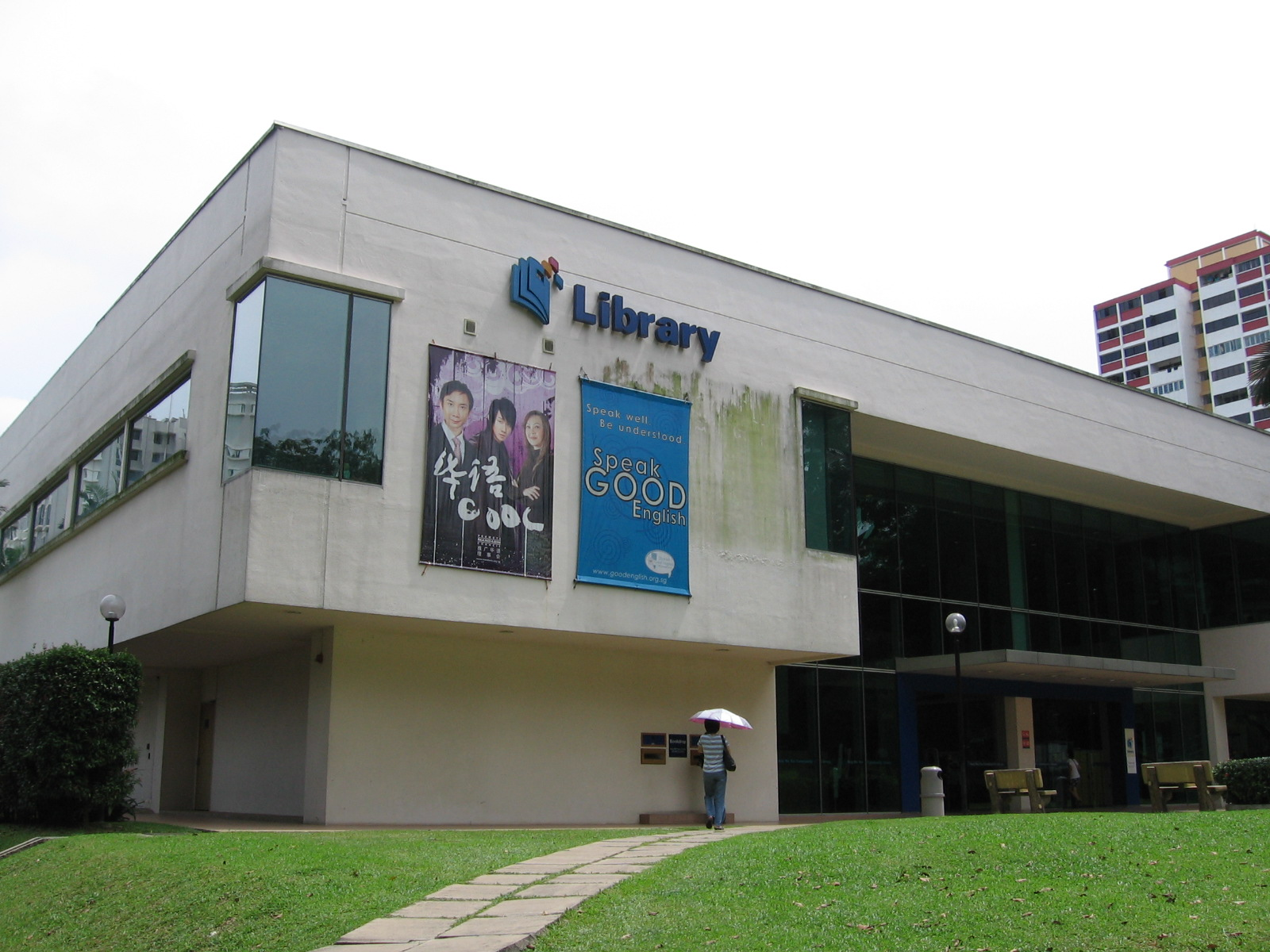
- The former Ang Mo Kio Library in December 2006
- 1.36925°N 103.8479°E
- Location: 53 Ang Mo Kio Avenue 3, #04-01, AMK Hub, Singapore 569933., Singapore
- Type: Public library
- Established: 17 August 1985; 41 years ago
- Branch of: National Library Board

Ang Mo Kio Library (Simplified Chinese: 宏茂桥图书馆) is one of the 26 public libraries established by the National Library Board of Singapore. The library was previously located at a standalone library, but the site was permanently closed in July 2026. The library has since been relocated to the AMK Hub shopping mall in November of the same year.

== History ==
Ang Mo Kio Community Library was officially opened on 17 August 1985 by Yeo Toon Chia, then Member of Parliament for Ang Mo Kio Constituency, and was opened to the public on 19 August. The library was closed in March 2002 for renovation, and was officially reopened on 5 January 2003 by Vivian Balakrishnan, then Minister of State for National Development. It was renamed as Ang Mo Kio Public Library in 2008.

=== Relocation ===
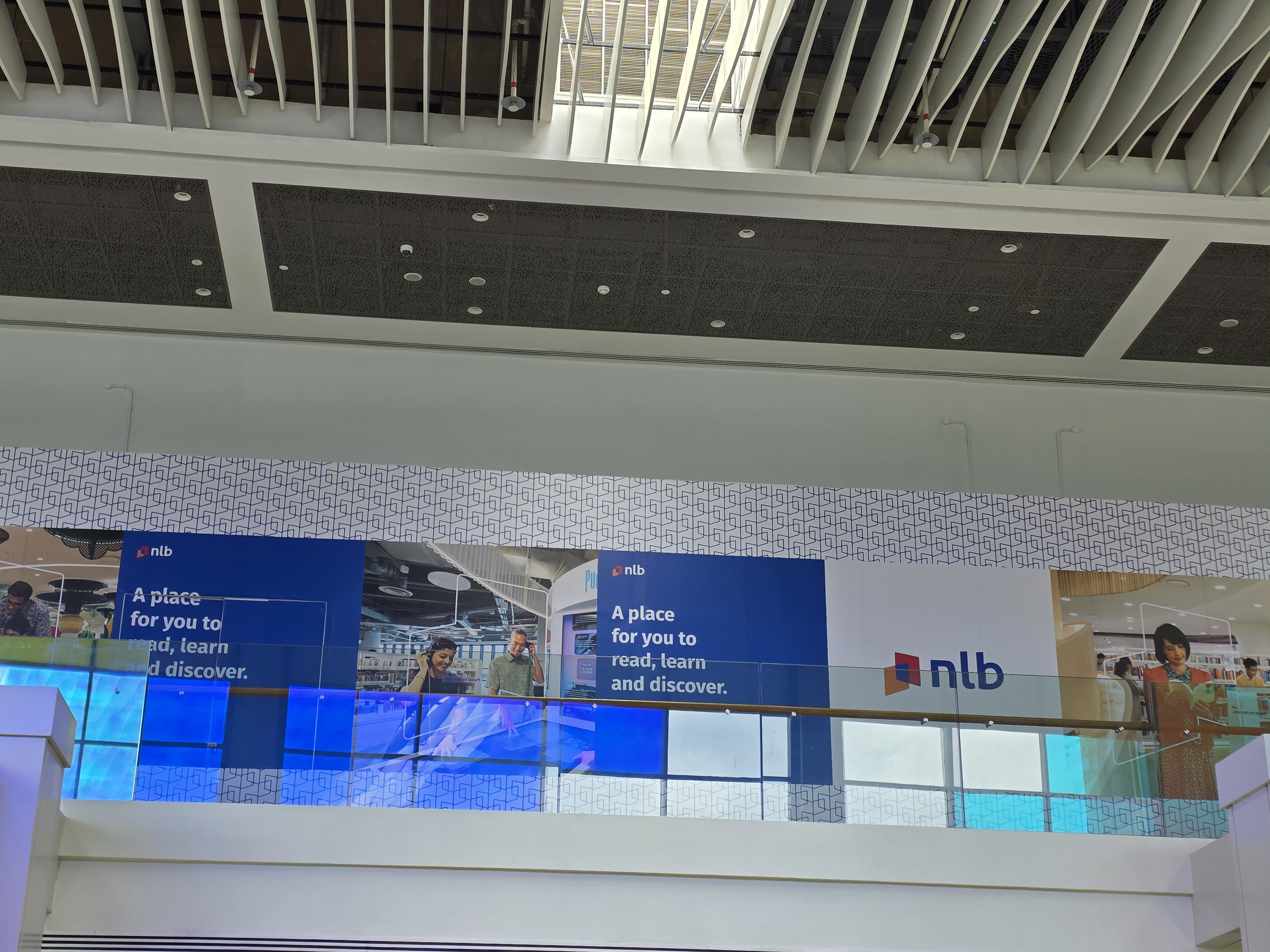
Hoarding for the new Ang Mo Kio Library on the fourth level of AMK Hub in August 2025.

In June 2026, it was announced that the library building would close permanently on 31 July, and the library would be relocated within AMK Hub by the fourth quarter of the year, taking over a space formerly occupied by a cinema on the fourth floor. The move was rationalised as to improve accessibility to the library, being located along a transport hub served by an MRT station and bus interchange. During the interim period, a temporary reading node would be located just outside the construction hoardings of the new library. This arrangement lasted till 29 October. The new library officially opened on 20 November 2026.
