= Toa Payoh Town Park =

Park in Singapore

Coordinates: 1.33057°N 103.84778°E

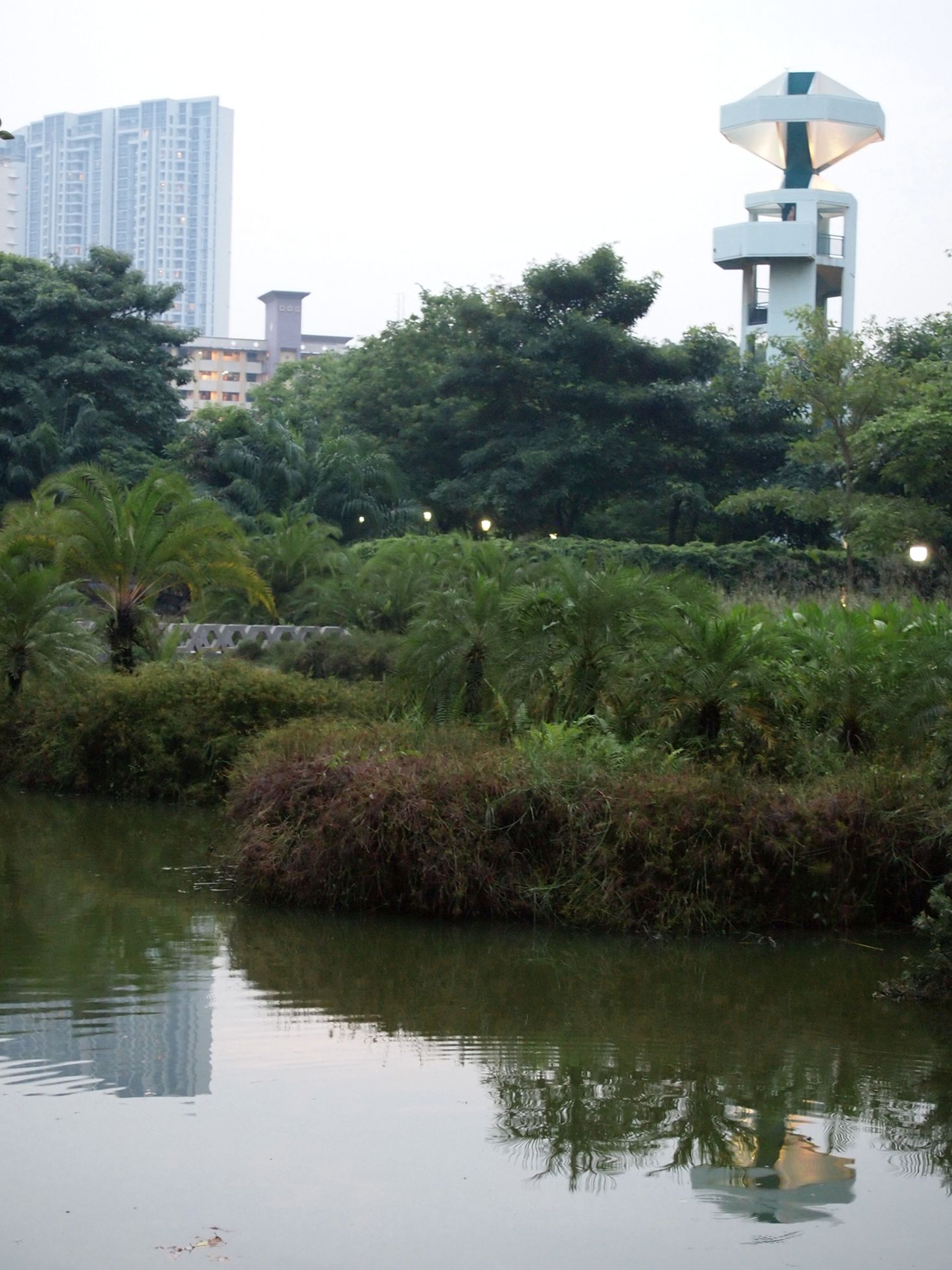
Interior of the Toa Payoh Town Park. Shows part of the pond and the observation tower.

Toa Payoh Town Park is located at the junction of Lorong 2 Toa Payoh and Lorong 6 Toa Payoh in Singapore. Park size is 4.8 hectares. The Park is currently closed for six years as part of the redevelopment of the Toa Payoh Sports Hub.

== History ==
The park, previously known as Toa Payoh Town Garden, was completed in 1973. Its main features are an observation tower and a landscaped pond with willow trees.

In the seventies, the town garden was a favored venue for outdoor wedding photography.

The observation tower is now not open to the public and there has been no plans announced by the National Parks Board to reopen it (as of 1 September 2011). There is a fountain pool installed around the tower.

The Toa Payoh Town Garden was partially closed in 1999 to make way for a temporary bus interchange. After the new Toa Payoh Bus Interchange at the HDB Hub was completed in June 2002, the temporary bus interchange was converted to a landscaped park. Toa Payoh Town Garden was subsequently renamed Toa Payoh Town Park.

== Visitor Info ==
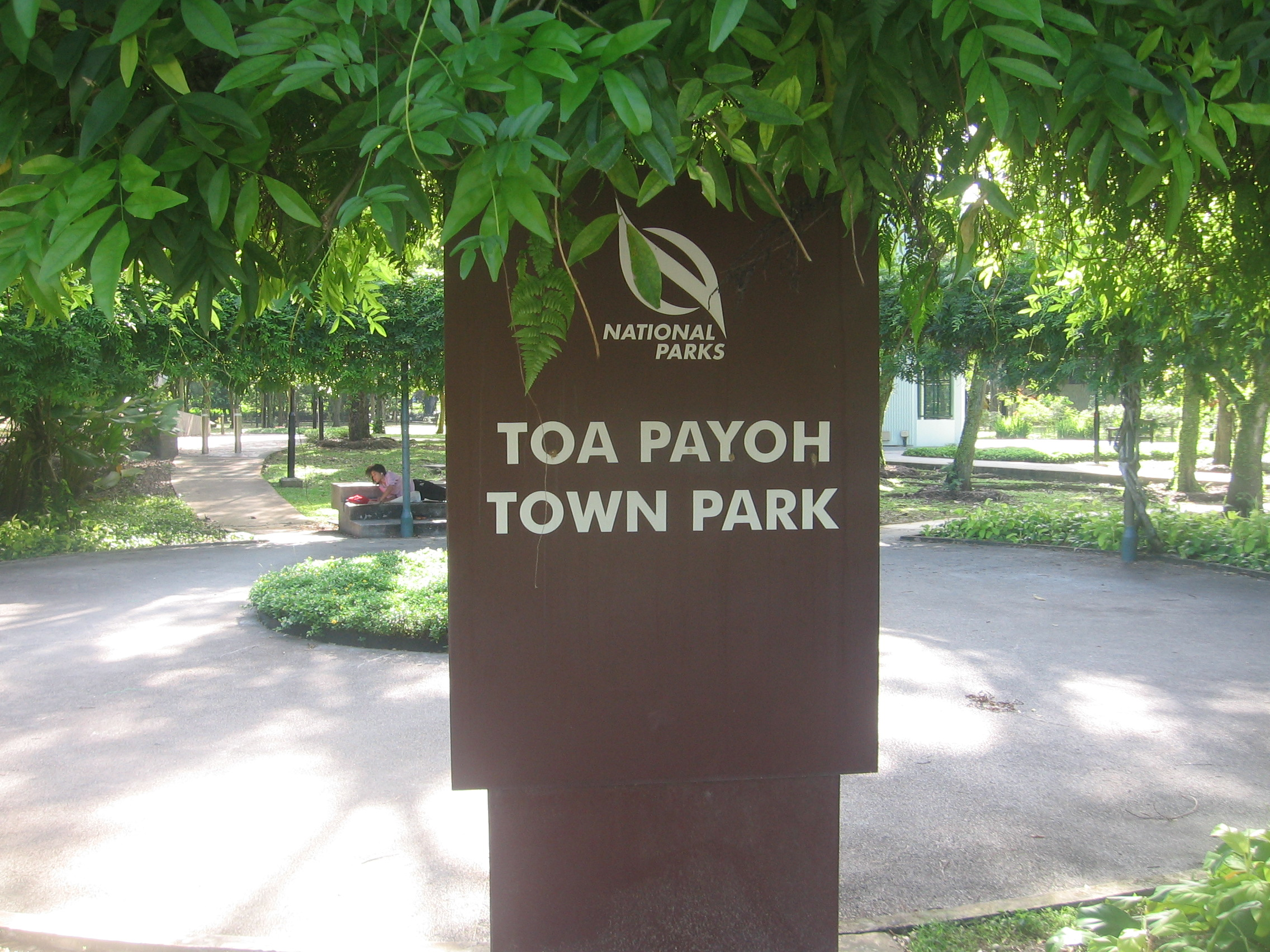
A sign at the entrance of Toa Payoh Town Park

Toa Payoh Town Park is located directly opposite the HDB Hub, Toa Payoh Bus Interchange and Toa Payoh MRT station. The park has limited parking space, which is only available to patrons of the Chinese restaurant operating inside the park.

The park has no gates and is open to the public at all times. It is equipped with open-concept restrooms, a large pavilion with a stage for organised activities, gazebos, foot reflexology footpaths and a jogging path.

The Chinese restaurant operating inside the park specializes in Taiwan porridge (congee), and is located in a building beside the pond. Near this building is an overhead bridge that connects Toa Payoh Town Park to Jalan Rajah.

== See also ==
- List of Parks in Singapore
