= AMK Hub =

Shopping mall in Singapore

- 宏茂桥坊
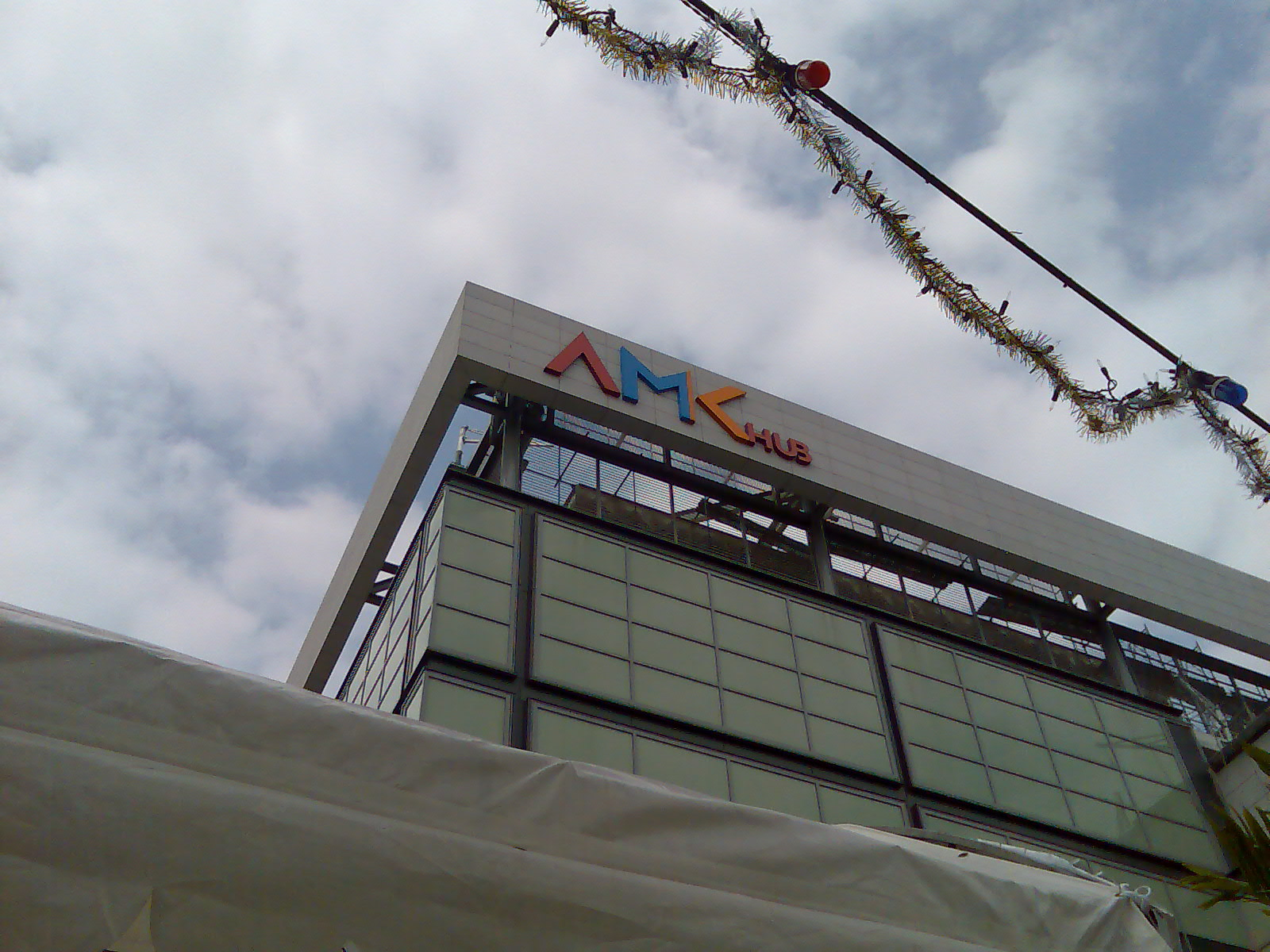
- Exterior of Ang Mo Kio Hub
- Location: Ang Mo Kio, Singapore
- Coordinates: 1°22′10.7″N 103°50′54.6″E
- Address: 53 Ang Mo Kio Avenue 3, Singapore 569933
- Opened: May 2007; 19 years ago
- Manager: Link REIT
- Owner: Mercatus Co-operative Ltd
- Num. of stores: 201
- Num. of anchor tenants: 6
- Floor area: 320,000 square feet (30,000 m^{2})
- Floors: 7
- Public transit: NS16 CR11 Ang Mo Kio; Ang Mo Kio
- Website: AMK Hub

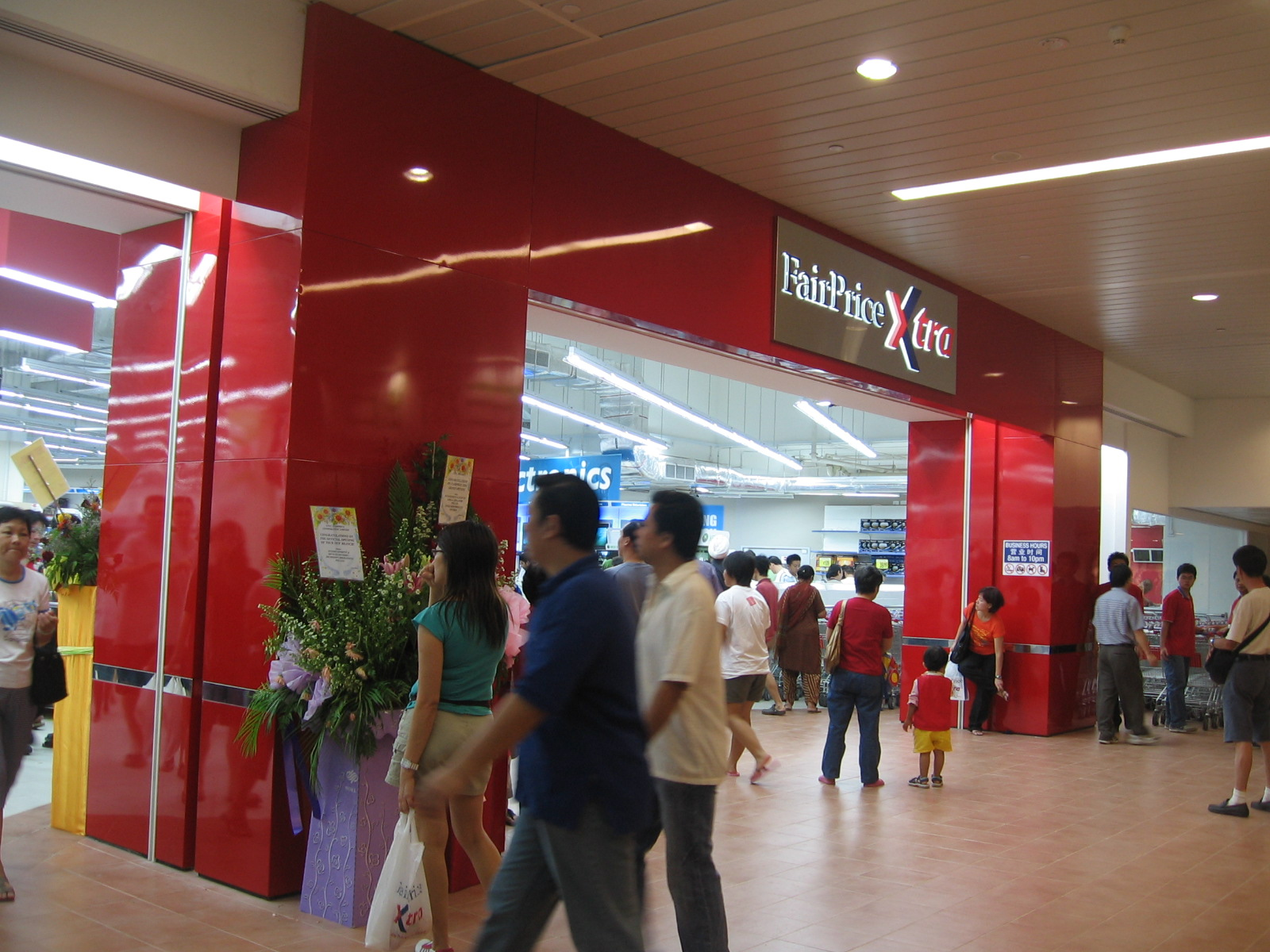
FairPrice Xtra located in AMK Hub

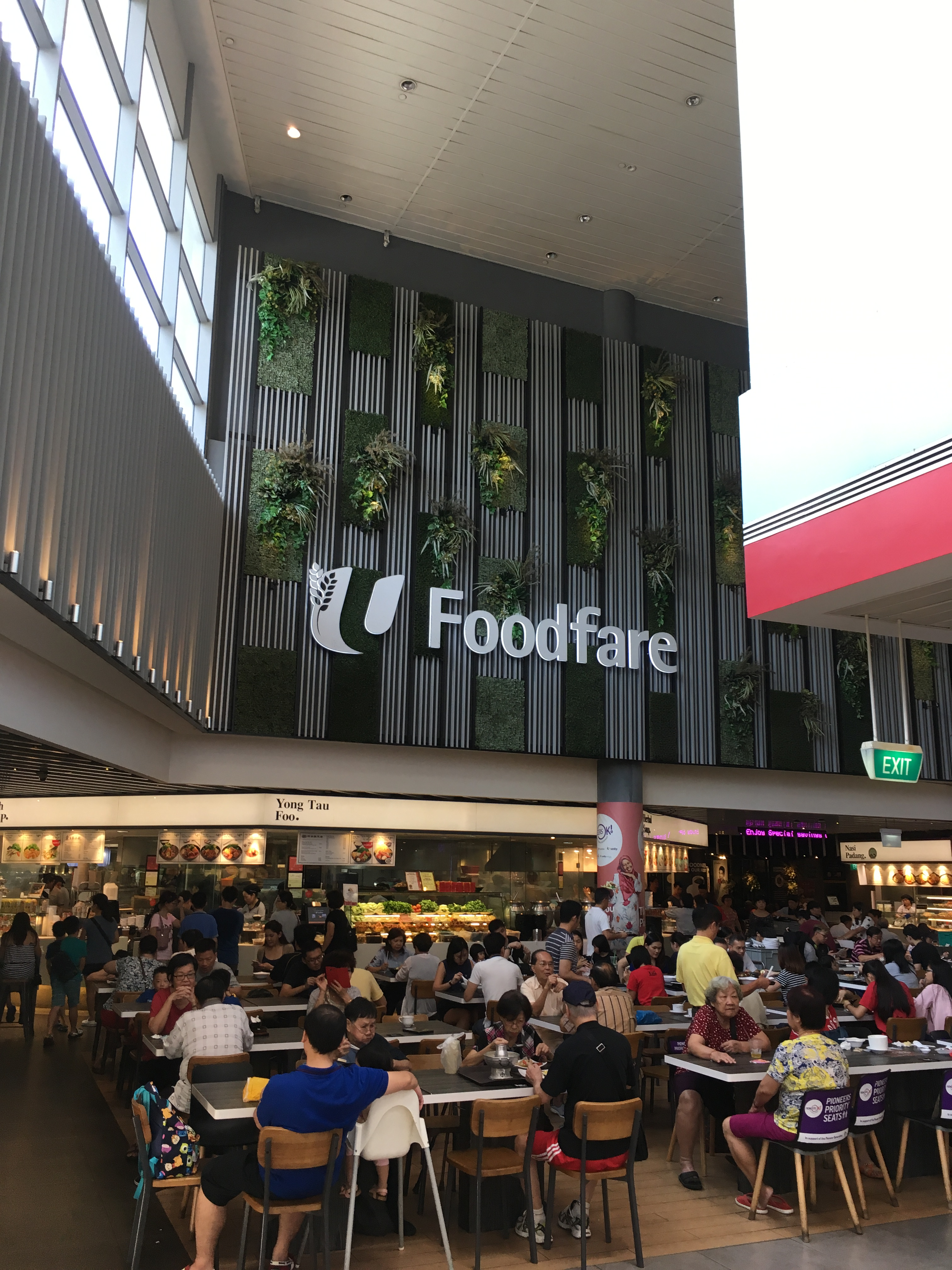
NTUC Foodfare located in AMK Hub

AMK Hub (abbreviation for Ang Mo Kio Hub) (Chinese: 宏茂桥坊) is a suburban shopping mall and civic centre located in Ang Mo Kio, within the North-East Region of Singapore. It is connected to Ang Mo Kio Bus Interchange which is linked to Ang Mo Kio MRT station via an underpass. The shopping mall has 48,250 square metres of gross floor area and 320,000 square feet (30,000 m^{2}) of retail space.

== History ==
Built on the former site of the old Ang Mo Kio Bus Interchange and the Oriental Emporium (Block 701), the original plan was intended to be a mixed used development consisting of a 33-storey residential development and a 20-storey office tower with the new Ang Mo Kio Bus Interchange on the ground level, set to be completed in 2004. However, shortly after demolition works to the old Ang Mo Kio Bus Interchange, the old contractor went bust, thus the site remained abandoned for two years. Meanwhile, the Singapore Labour Foundation (the then owner of AMK Hub) made drastic changes to the proposed development, from a mixed used development to a full fledged retail mall incorporating the bus interchange. As per the land lease conditions for the site, no less than half of the gross floor area must be reserved for SLF, NTUC as well as their affiliates, public institutions and not-for-profit organisations.

The mall was nearly sold to Hong Kong-based Link REIT in 2022, but the current owner, Mercatus, chose to retain ownership of the mall in part due to the land lease conditions imposed and entered a 10-year asset and property management contract with them instead.

In a bid to better serve the community with new vibrancy and fresh experiences, as well in line with the land lease conditions, the entirety of Level 4, comprising the cinema, arcade, NTUC Club lounge and restaurants, was shuttered in July 2024 to make way for civic and community services, incorporating the new Ang Mo Kio Library, a ServiceSG centre, Singapore's first adaptative gym for stroke patients ran by Stroke Support Station (S3), an e2i career advisory centre and the corporate office of NTUC Health. The floor reopened in December 2025 after a year-long renovation, with the library reopening in November 2026. As compensation for the closure of eateries on that level, a food and beverage cluster was created on Level 1.
