= Khor Ean Ghee =

Singaporean watercolor artist

- Born: Khor Ean Ghee; 1 December 1934 (age 91); Penang, Malaysia
- Years active: 1954–present

Khor Ean Ghee (born 1 December 1934) is a former HDB interior designer and watercolour painter. He designed several playgrounds, such as the Toa Payoh Dragon Playground and the Dakota Crescent Dove Playground in Singapore. He has also served as the president of the Singapore Art Society and was a founding member of the Singapore Watercolour Society.

== Early life and education ==
Khor was born in Penang, Malaysia on 1 December 1934. While he was in primary school, he came in first place in an art competition. From 1948 to 1957, he attended Chung Ling High School in Penang. He was a student of prominent Malaysian artist Khaw Sia. From 1957 to 1961, he studied at the National Taiwan Normal University. He graduated from the university with a Bachelor of Fine Arts degree. From 1964 to 1968, he studied at the London School of Architecture, where he obtained his Diploma in Interior Design.

== Career ==
In 1954, his watercolour paintings were displayed at The Summer Salon in England. In the following year, they were put on display at the Royal Institute of Painters in Water Colours in London. He held his first solo exhibition in 1956. In 1960, while he was still studying in Taiwan, he won the second prize at the 1960 Watercolour Painting Competition. After graduating, he returned to Penang and was employed at Chung Ling High School as a scoutsmaster, arts teacher and disciplinarian. However, as his Taiwanese degree was not recognised by the Malaysian government at the time, his salary was lower than the salary of his colleagues. He also taught Saturday evening classes at the Methodist Boys' School as a lower and upper form senior art master. He left both schools in August 1964, and held his second solo exhibition at the Selangor Club Art Gallery in Kuala Lumpur a few weeks later before leaving for London to further his education.

After graduating from the London School of Architecture, Khor left for Singapore in hopes of finding employment. After arriving, he met several other watercolour painters. On 18 August 1969, Khor, along with twelve other watercolour painters, founded the Singapore Watercolour Society. He served as the society's president from 1972 to 1973 and from 1977 to 1987, and as its vice president from 1989 to 1990 and from 1994 to 1996. In the same year, he was employed as an interior designer at the Housing and Development Board. He was tasked with designing the landscapes of HDB estates and their playgrounds. The playgrounds which he designed featured large mosaic sculptures of large animals. While he was employed at the HDB, he designed more than thirty playgrounds, around ten of which remained by February 2014. He designed the iconic Toa Payoh Dragon Playground, which was built in 1979. He also designed the Dakota Crescent Dove Playground.

From 1977 to 1978, he served as a member of the Applied Arts Trade Advisory Committee. From 1977 to 1984, he served as a board member of the School of Ornamental Horticulture. He held his third solo exhibition at the Singapore Chinese Chamber of Commerce and Industry in April 1977. In 1979, he was made a Fellow of the British Institute of Interior Design. On 26 November 1987, he received the Vocational and Industrial Training Board of the Applied Arts Trade Advisory Committee. In 1989, he was employed at the LASALLE College of the Arts as a senior lecturer, a role which he held until 1990. In the same year, he was made a Fellow of the Chartered Society of Designers. From 1991 to 1997, he served as a property manager at the LASALLE College of the Arts.

In 1994, Khor held his fourth solo exhibition. From 1996 to 2005, he served as the president of the Federation of Art Societies Singapore. From 1996 to 2010, he served as the president of the Singapore Art Society. From 1998 to 2005, he served as the vice president of the Federation of Art Societies. His fifth solo exhibition was held at the Exhibition Hall in Orchard Point in October 2001. His sixth solo exhibition was held at the Penang State Museum and Art Gallery in April 2002. In the same year, he was made a council member of the Japan Modern Fine Arts Association. In the following year, he became one of the trustees of the Dr Tan Tsze Chor-Singapore Art Society Trust. In 2005, he won the top prize of the Japan Modern Fine Arts Exhibition. In the following year, he became an advisor to the Federation of Art Societies, as well as an advisor to the Asia Watercolour Painting Alliance. In 2007, he became an honorary member of the Jiangsu Watercolour Research Institute. He also won the institute's Gold Medal of Excellence. He held his seventh solo exhibition at the Penang State Museum and Art Gallery in 2008. In 2011, he became an honorary president of the Singapore Art Society.

== Gallery ==
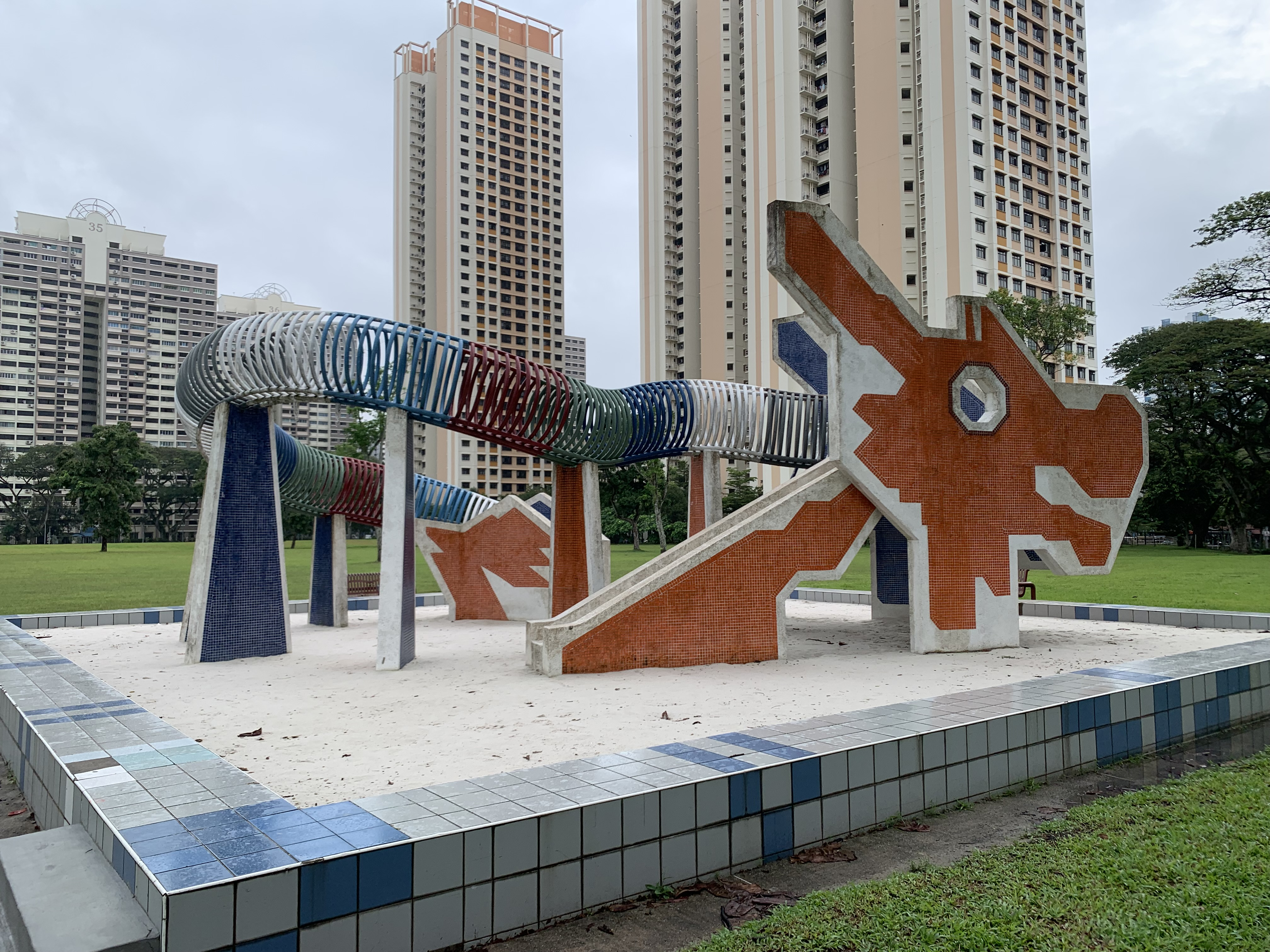
The Toa Payoh dragon playground

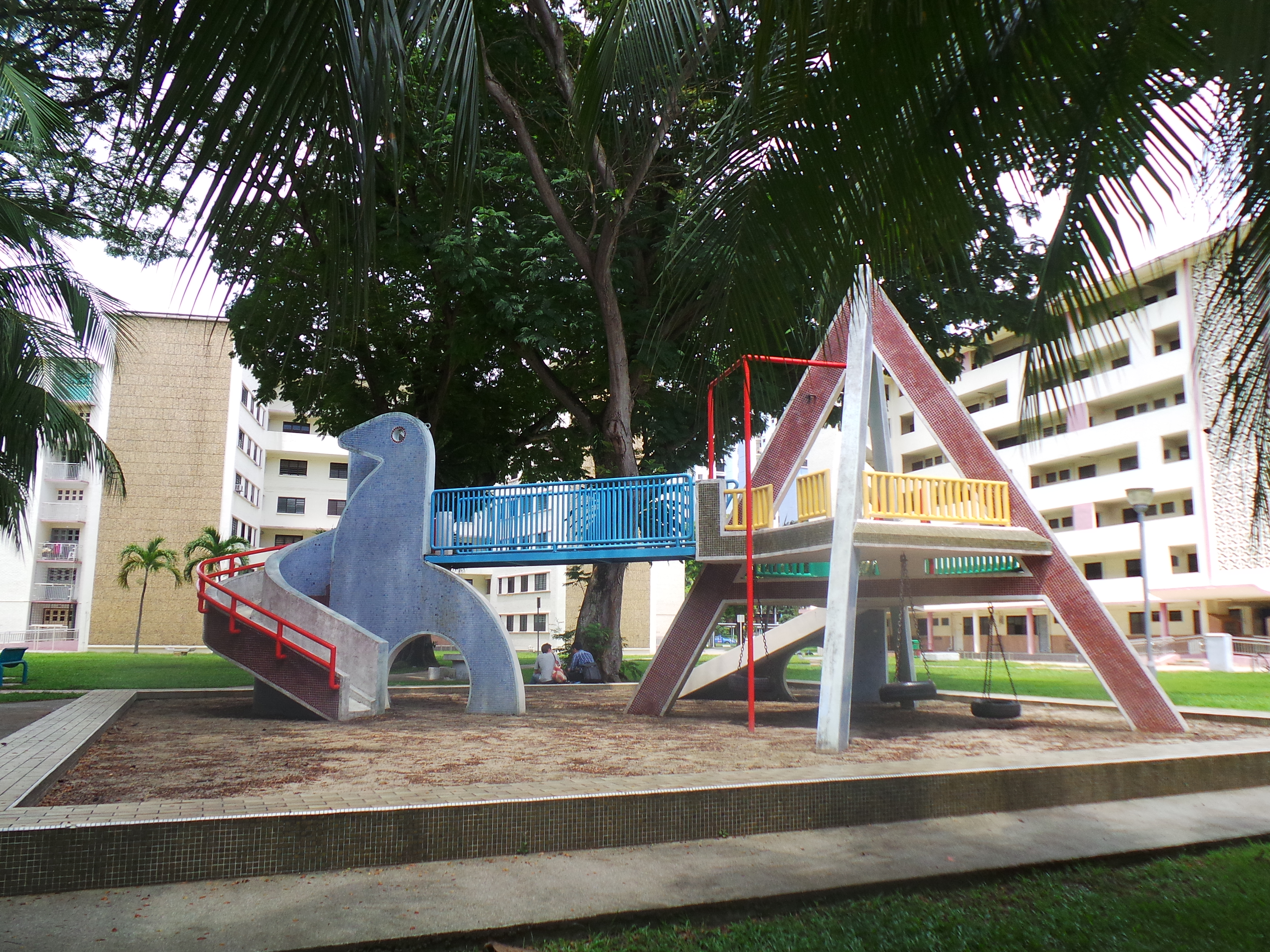
Dove Playground at Dakota Crescent

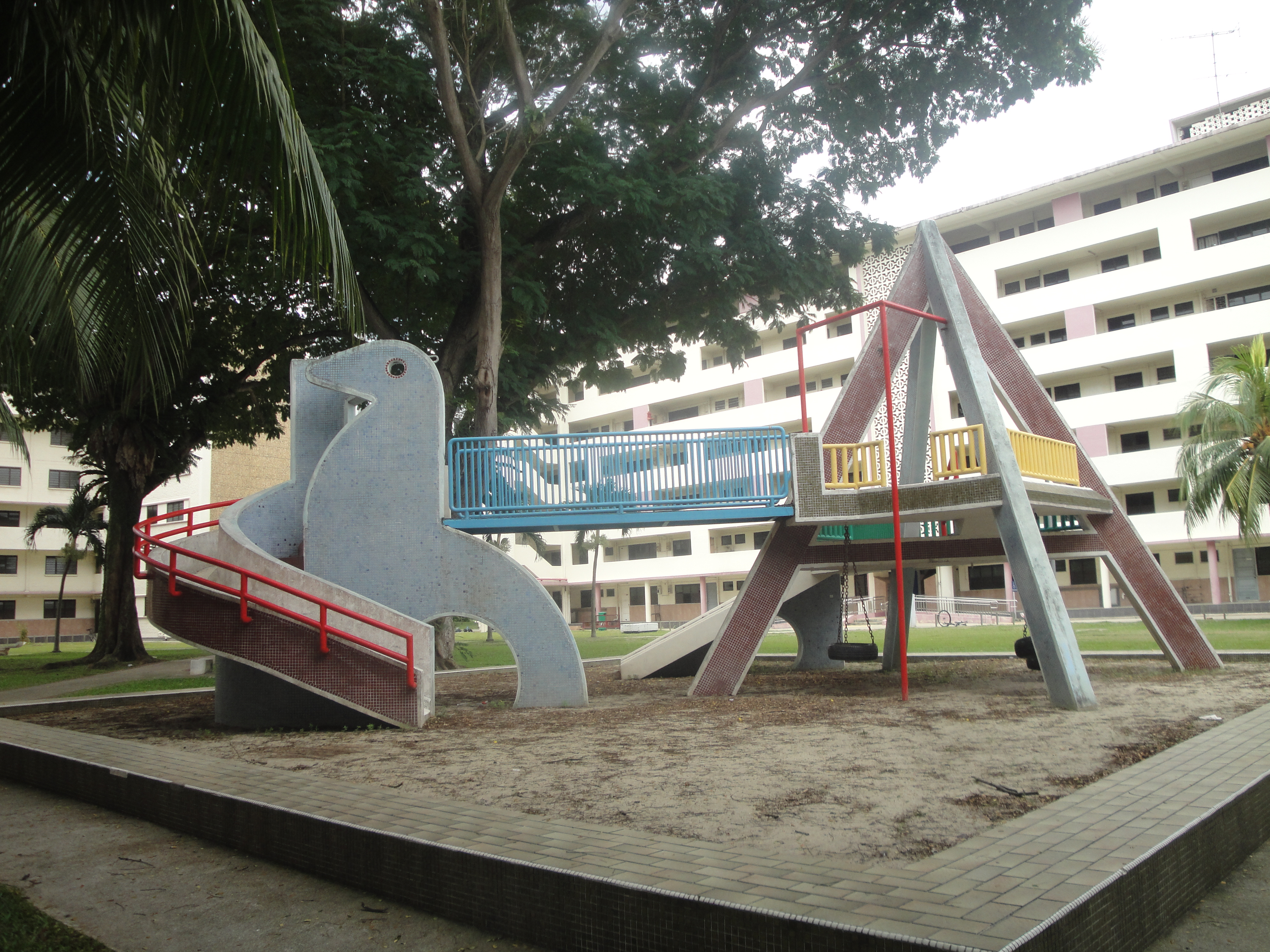
Dove Playground
