= HDB Hub =

HDB headquarters in Singapore

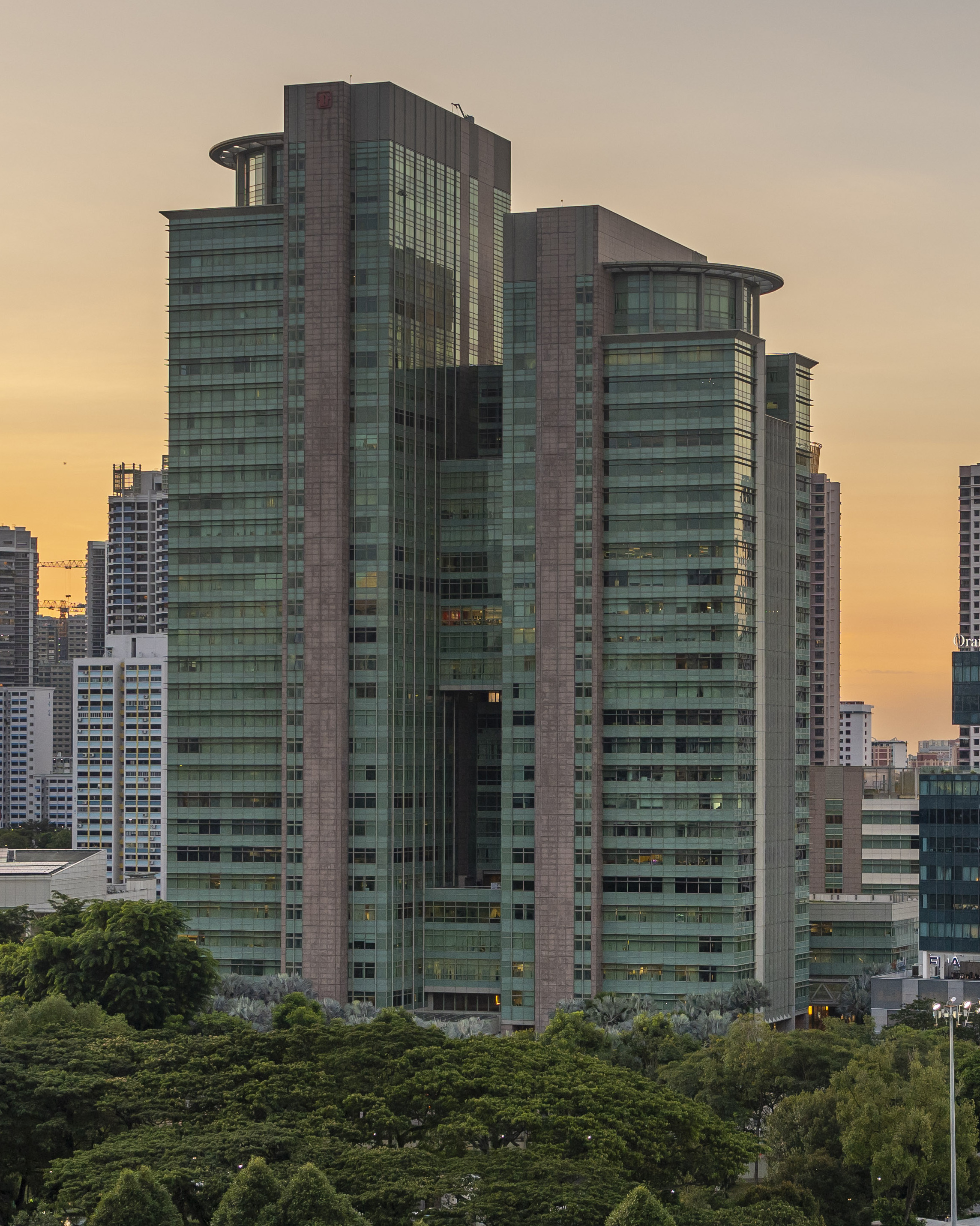
- HDB Hub viewed from Whampoa in 2023
- Location: 530 Lorong 6 Toa Payoh, Singapore 310460
- Coordinates: 1.3323°N 103.8457°E
- Opened: 2002; 24 years ago
- Owner: Housing and Development Board
- Floors: 4
- Public transit: NS19 Toa Payoh
- Website: www.hdb.gov.sg/managing-my-home/living-in-my-community/exploring-my-neighbourhood/explore-my-town/toa-payoh/hdb-hub

HDB Hub is the headquarters of the Housing and Development Board. It is located on Lorong 6 Toa Payoh in Toa Payoh, Singapore next to Toa Payoh MRT station.

== History ==
The HDB Hub opened on 10 June 2002 as the headquarters of the Housing and Development Board, with all public service counters in the board's former headquarters in Bukit Merah being closed on 8 June. The building cost $380 million to complete. A showroom, named Habitat Forum, was launched in the hub on 24 October 2002.

The building is connected to Toa Payoh Bus Interchange on the ground level and Toa Payoh MRT station at the basement levels. The hub includes four levels of retail space with an indoor plaza and a 33-storey office tower.

Tenants of the office building initially included ABN AMRO, OCBC Bank, POSB Bank, DBS Bank, United Overseas Bank, housing agency C & H Properties, real estate firm ERA Real Estate, property agent PropNex, and commercial space management company Ideal Connection. Real estate firm DTZ and Global Real Estate later became tenants. By September 2003, at least nine law firms were located in the hub.

== Facilities ==
The RSAF50@Heartlands event was held in the open plaza in 2018 to celebrate the golden jubilee of the Republic of Singapore Air Force.

== Gallery ==
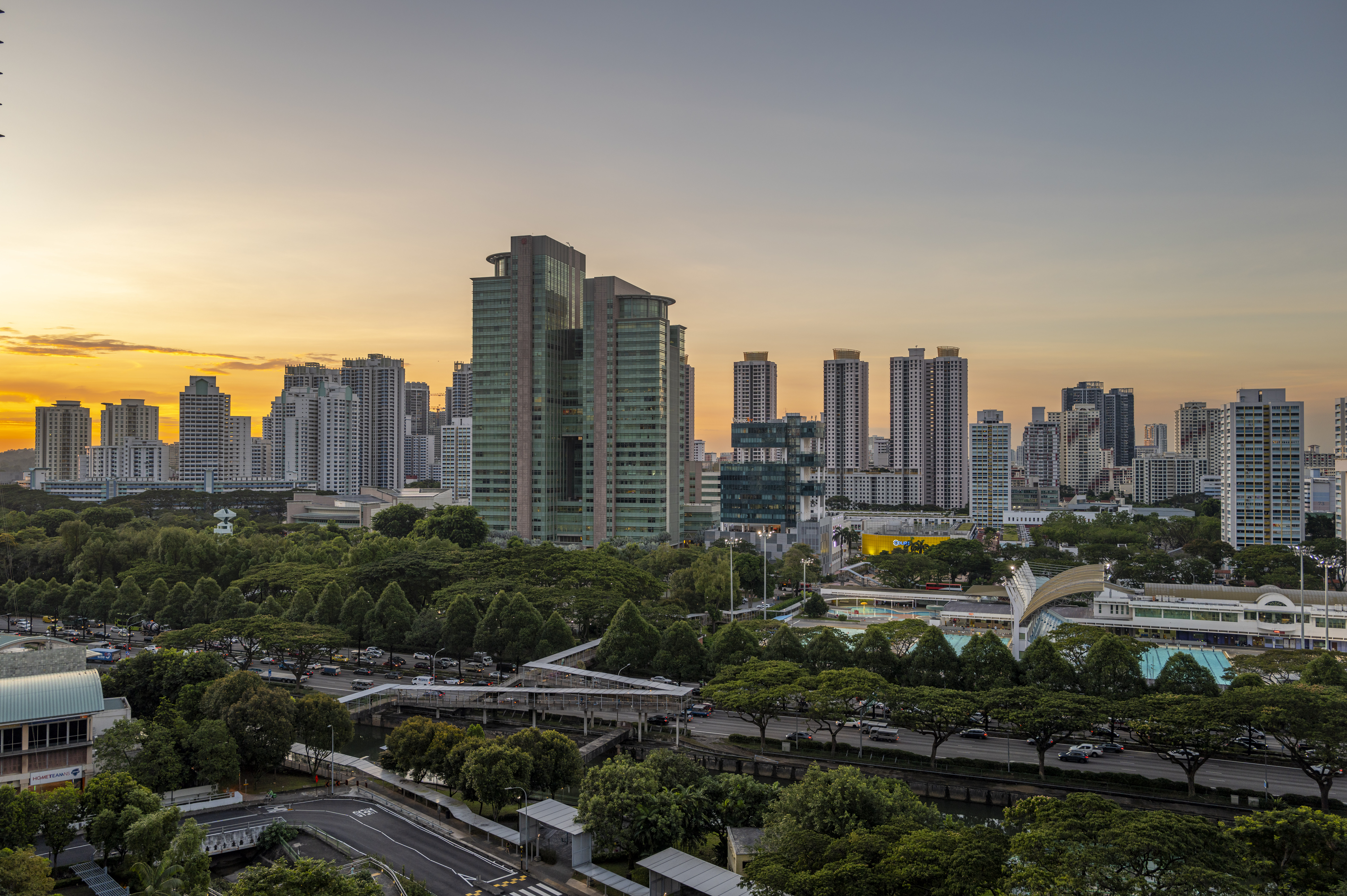
Shot of HDB Hub from across the PIE showing surrounding buildings

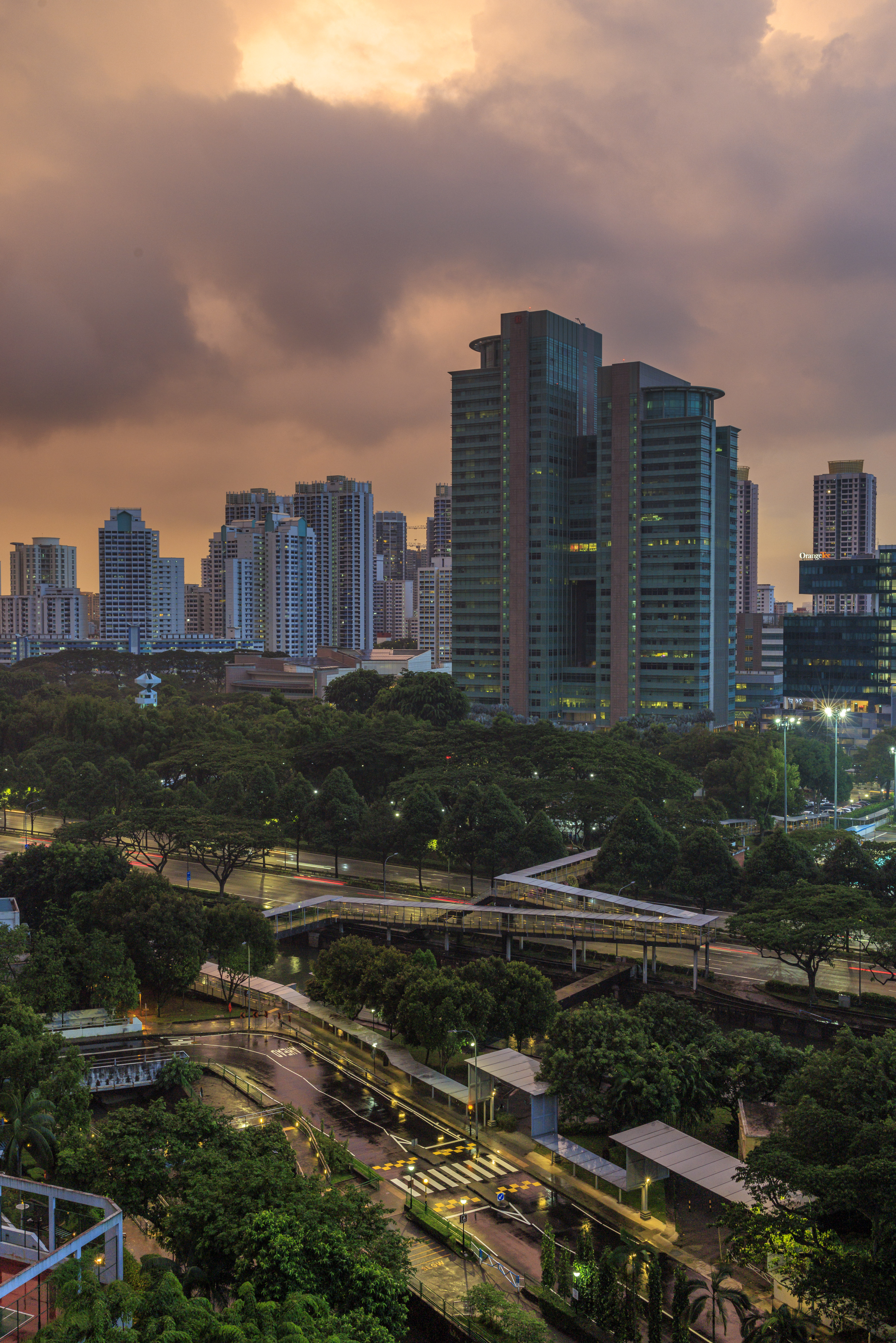
HDB Hub in inclement weather
