= Chung Hwa Medical Institution =

- 中华医院 (Chinese)
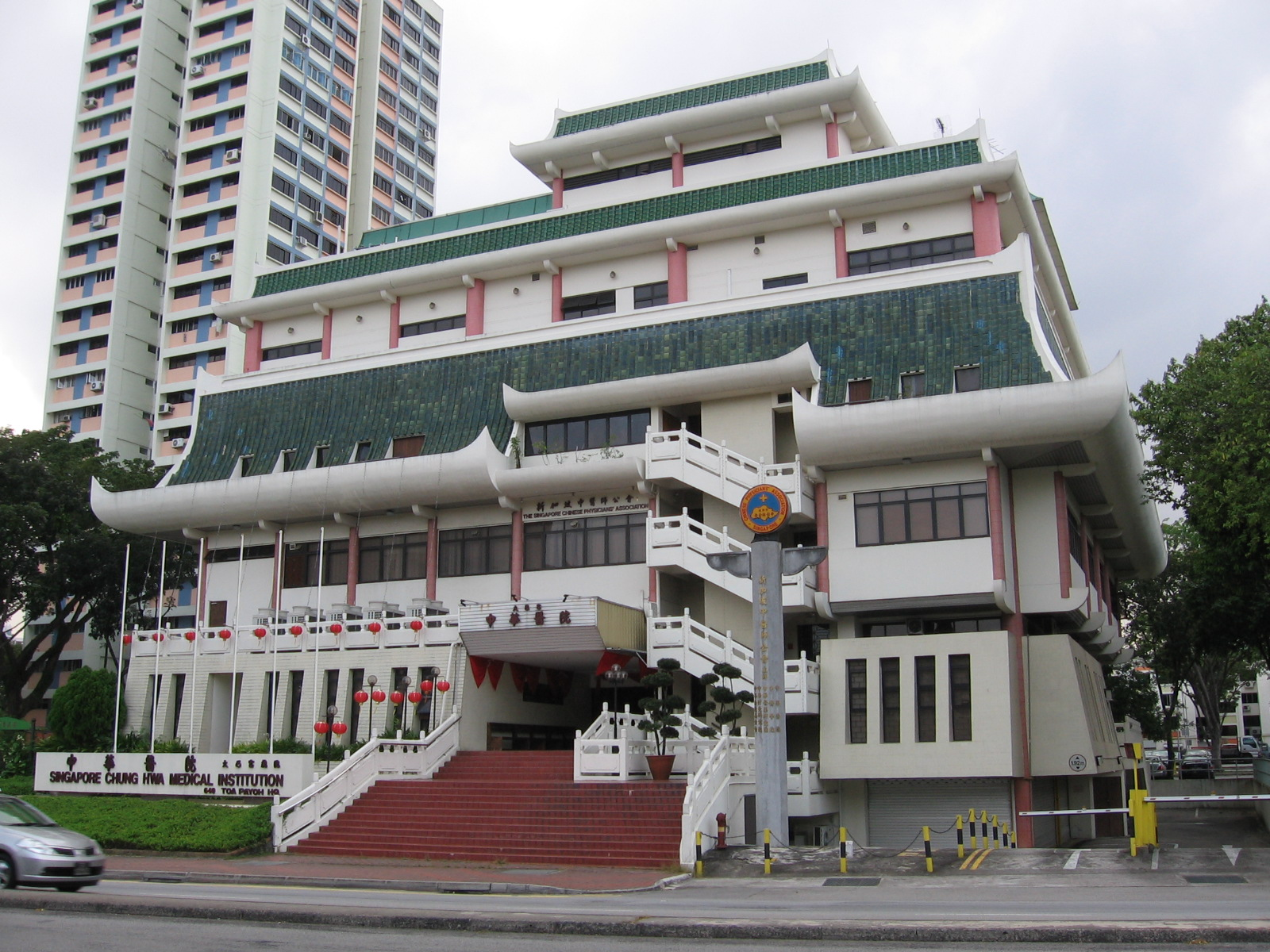
- Chung Hwa Medical Institution

General information
- Address: 640 Lorong 4 Toa Payoh Singapore 319522
- Country: Singapore
- Coordinates: 1.33234°N 103.85129°E
- Current tenants: Singapore Chinese Physicians Association Singapore College of Traditional Chinese Medicine Chinese Medical and Drugs Research Institute Chinese Acupuncture Research Institution
- Opened: 28 October 1978

Website
- www.zhonghuayiyuan.com

Chung Hwa Medical Institution is a medical institution located in Toa Payoh, Singapore. The institution is the headquarters of the Singapore Chinese Physicians Association (SCPA), and houses the Singapore College of Traditional Chinese Medicine, the Chinese Medical and Drugs Research Institute, Chinese Acupuncture Research Institution, and a traditional Chinese medicine clinic.

== History ==
Originally known as the Chung Hwa Free Hospital, the institution was established on 28 October 1978 as a branch of the Chung Hwa Free Clinic along Telok Ayer Street. Its construction was funded by public donations during a fundraising campaign held in 1972, with contributions coming from a variety of donors, including over 5,700 taxi drivers and 500 trishaw riders. The institution offered free medicine and herbs under a free clinic operating model, requiring only a nominal 50 cent registration fee. On the opening day, it saw over 400 patients seeking treatment. In 1979, an acupuncture exhibition took place there. In 1980, the institution began utilising fusion approaches, combining traditional treatments with modern technology, such as the use of X-rays for diagnosis.

The institution has been included in the Toa Payoh Heritage Trail by the National Heritage Board.
