= Ang Mo Kio Bus Interchange =

Bus interchange in Ang Mo Kio, Singapore

Ang Mo Kio Bus Interchange 宏茂桥巴士转换站 Pusat Pertukaran Bas Ang Mo Kio
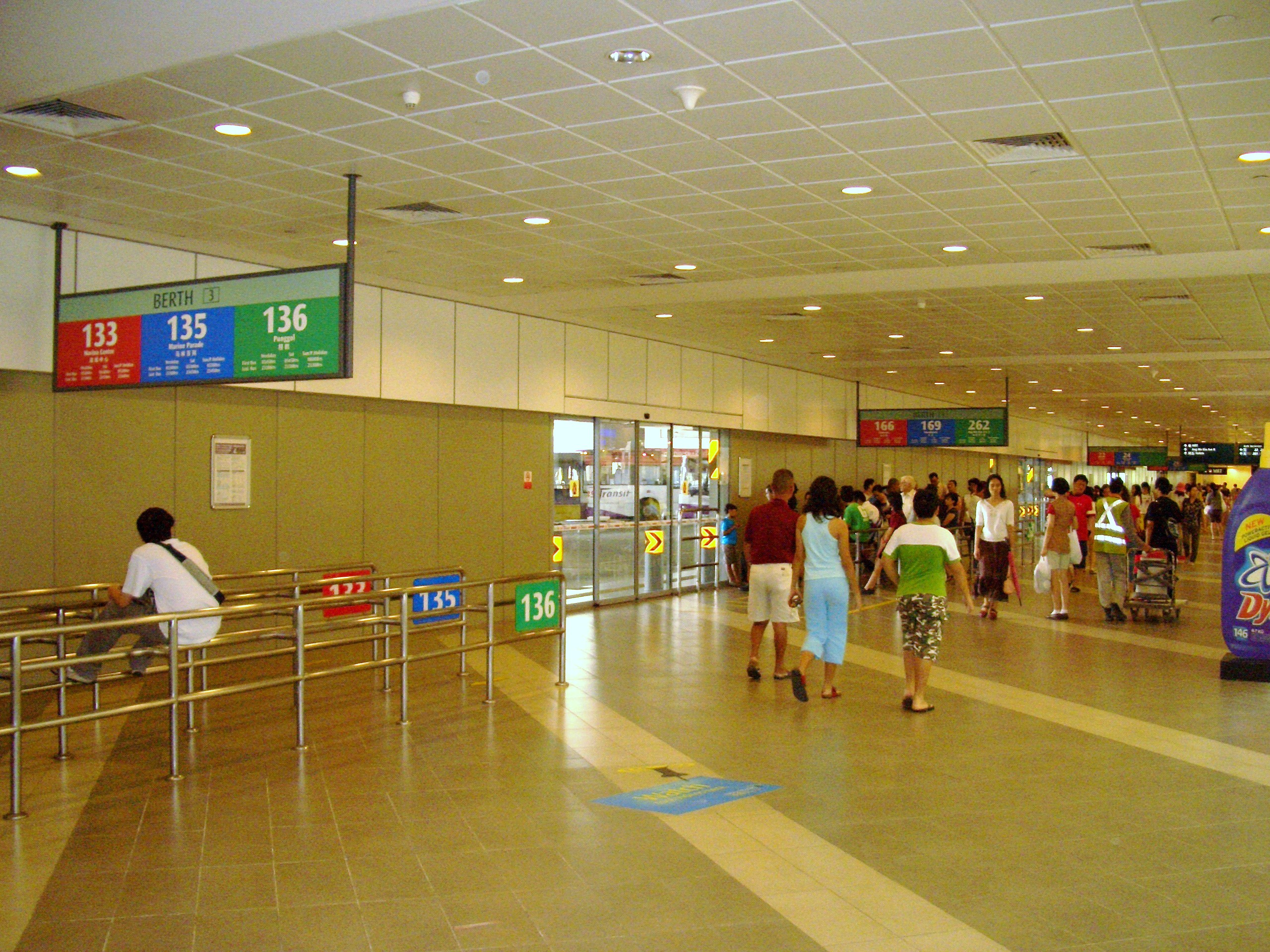
- Interior of the bus interchange in December 2008

General information
- Location: 57 Ang Mo Kio Avenue 8, Singapore 567751
- System: Public Bus Interchange
- Owner: Land Transport Authority
- Operator: SBS Transit
- Bus routes: 14 (SBS Transit); 1 (Tower Transit Singapore); 1 (Go-Ahead Singapore)
- Bus stands: 6 Sawtooth Boarding Berths; 4 Alighting Berths
- Bus operators: SBS Transit; Tower Transit Singapore; Go-Ahead Singapore
- Connections: NS16 CR11 Ang Mo Kio

Construction
- Structure type: At-grade
- Accessible: Accessible alighting/boarding points Accessible public toilets Graduated kerb edges Tactile guidance system

History
- Opened: 10 April 1983; 43 years ago (Old); 24 March 2002; 24 years ago (Temporary); 28 April 2007; 19 years ago (Integrated Transport Hub)
- Closed: 23 March 2002; 24 years ago (Old); 27 April 2007; 19 years ago (Temporary)

Key dates
- 10 April 1983: Commenced operations
- 24 March 2002: Operations transferred to Temporary bus interchange
- 28 April 2007: Operations transferred to new and air-conditioned bus interchange as Integrated Transport Hub
Location

Ang Mo Kio Bus Interchange is an air-conditioned bus interchange located at Ang Mo Kio Town Centre, Singapore, serving residential and industrial areas around Ang Mo Kio and Yio Chu Kang. It is the third air-conditioned bus interchange in Singapore, integrated within the AMK Hub development, and connected to Ang Mo Kio MRT station via an underpass below Ang Mo Kio Avenue 8. Nearby public amenities include Cheng San Community Centre, Ang Mo Kio Polyclinic, Djitsun Mall and Ang Mo Kio Town East Garden. It was opened by Prime Minister Lee Hsien Loong.

== History ==
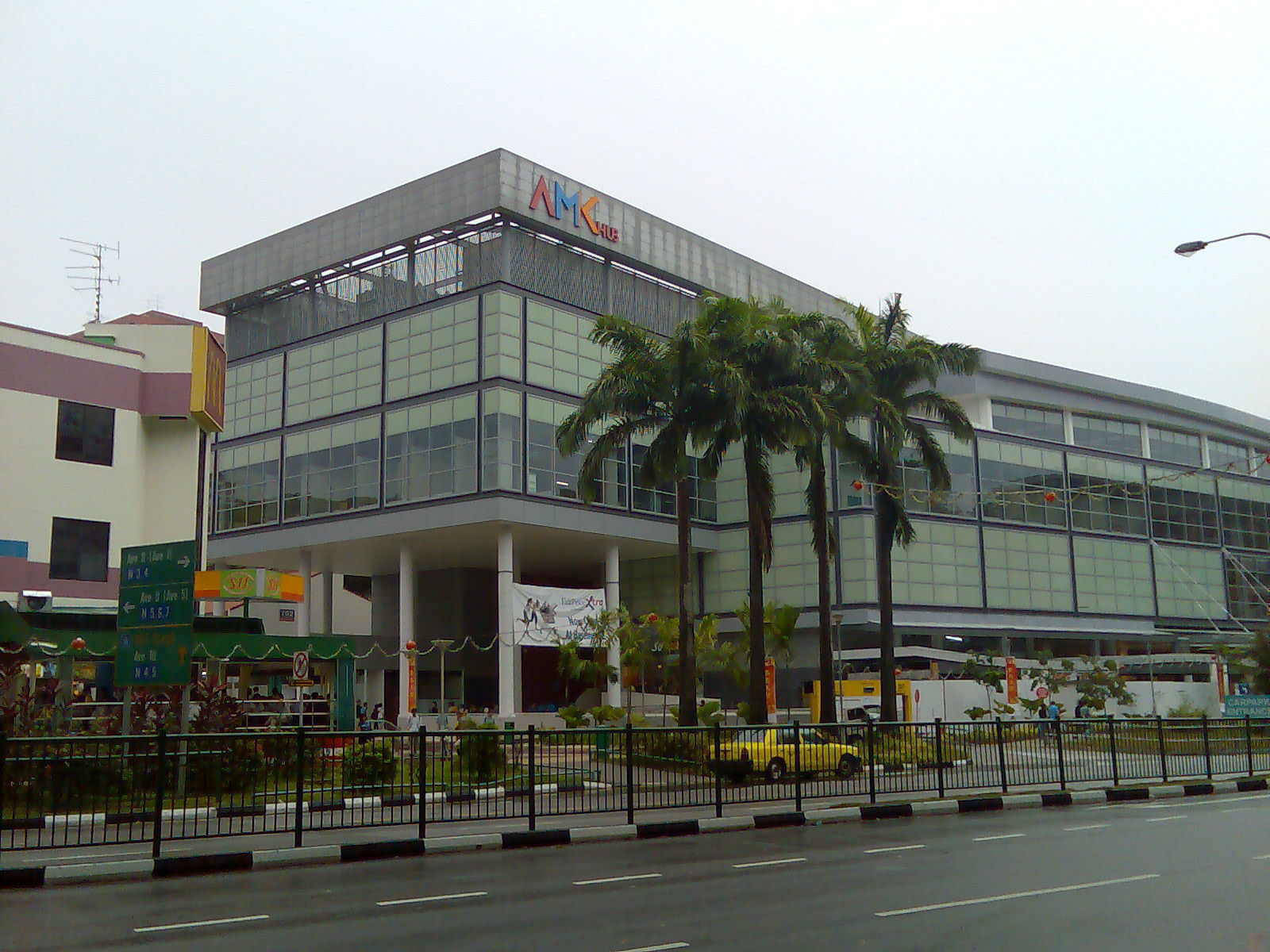
The new, air-conditioned bus interchange of Ang Mo Kio is located within AMK Hub. Taken in March 2007.

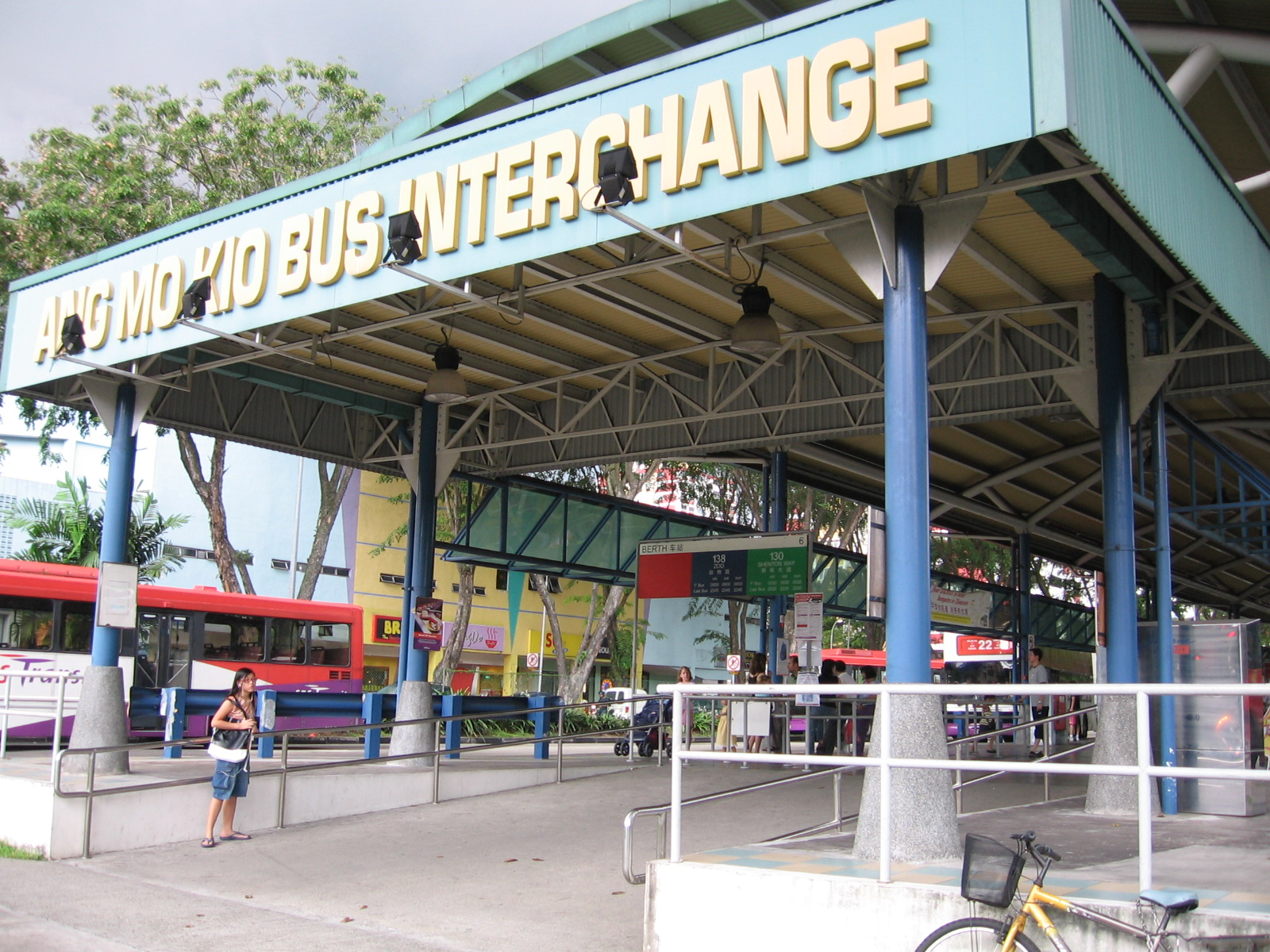
Ang Mo Kio Temporary Bus Interchange located near Ang Mo Kio Public Library in November 2006. It started operations in March 2002, and ended operations in April 2007.

=== Original interchange ===
Plans for the bus interchange were first announced in March 1979, as part of the Singapore Bus Service's (SBS) efforts to rationalise the Singapore bus system. Constructed by the Housing and Development Board (HDB), the bus park of the interchange was completed in 1979. In January 1980, bus services that previously terminated at a bus terminus along Ang Mo Kio Avenue 6 were amended to the interchange, but passengers were not allowed to board or alight at the interchange. Due to concerns over the interchange's small size making it unsafe for commuters, in August 1980, SBS announced that it would be replacing the interchange with a larger facility. To facilitate the interchange's construction, the HDB granted permission to SBS to utilise half of a plot of land beside the interchange and another plot then occupied by a carpark.

Work on the replacement bus interchange commenced in January 1981, and operations at the new interchange commenced on 10 April 1983. Covering an area of more than 14,000 square metres (150,000 sq ft) and with 36 berths, the bus interchange included features such as swing gates and turnstiles to handle commuter traffic, along with safety railings and walls to ensure commuters' safety.

=== Current interchange ===
In 2001, the government announced plans to redevelop the bus interchange to form part of an integrated development, and to make way for the development, the interchange was moved to a temporary location along Ang Mo Kio Avenue 8 in March 2002. Construction of the integrated development was delayed by a dispute between the developer and the government over the price of the land parcel, only beginning in March 2005. Subsequently, the new bus interchange within the integrated development started operations in April 2007.

== Bus contracting model ==
Under the bus contracting model, all bus services operating from Ang Mo Kio Bus Interchange were divided into eight Bus Packages, operated by three different bus operators.

=== List of bus services ===
Operator	Package	Routes	Destination
Go-Ahead Singapore	Loyang	136	Punggol
SBS Transit	Bedok	25	Upper East Coast
SBS Transit	Bishan-Toa Payoh	73	Toa Payoh
SBS Transit	Clementi	166	Clementi
SBS Transit	Seletar	24	Changi Airport
SBS Transit	Seletar	130	Shenton Way
SBS Transit	Seletar	133	Shenton Way
SBS Transit	Seletar	135	Kembangan
SBS Transit	Seletar	138	Singapore Zoo
SBS Transit	Seletar	138M	AMK Polyclinic
SBS Transit	Seletar	261	AMK Ave 10
SBS Transit	Seletar	262	AMK Ave 2
SBS Transit	Seletar	265	AMK Ave 10
SBS Transit	Seletar	265	AMK Ave 9
SBS Transit	Seletar	269	AMK St 61
SBS Transit	Seletar	269A	AMK St 61 (Yio Chu Kang CC) (PM Peak)
SBS Transit	Sengkang-Hougang	86	Sengkang
SBS Transit	Serangoon-Eunos	22 (until June 2027)	Eunos
SMRT Buses	Serangoon-Eunos	22 (from June 2027)	Eunos
Tower Transit Singapore	Sembawang-Yishun	169	Woodlands
