= Toa Payoh Library =

Public library in Singapore

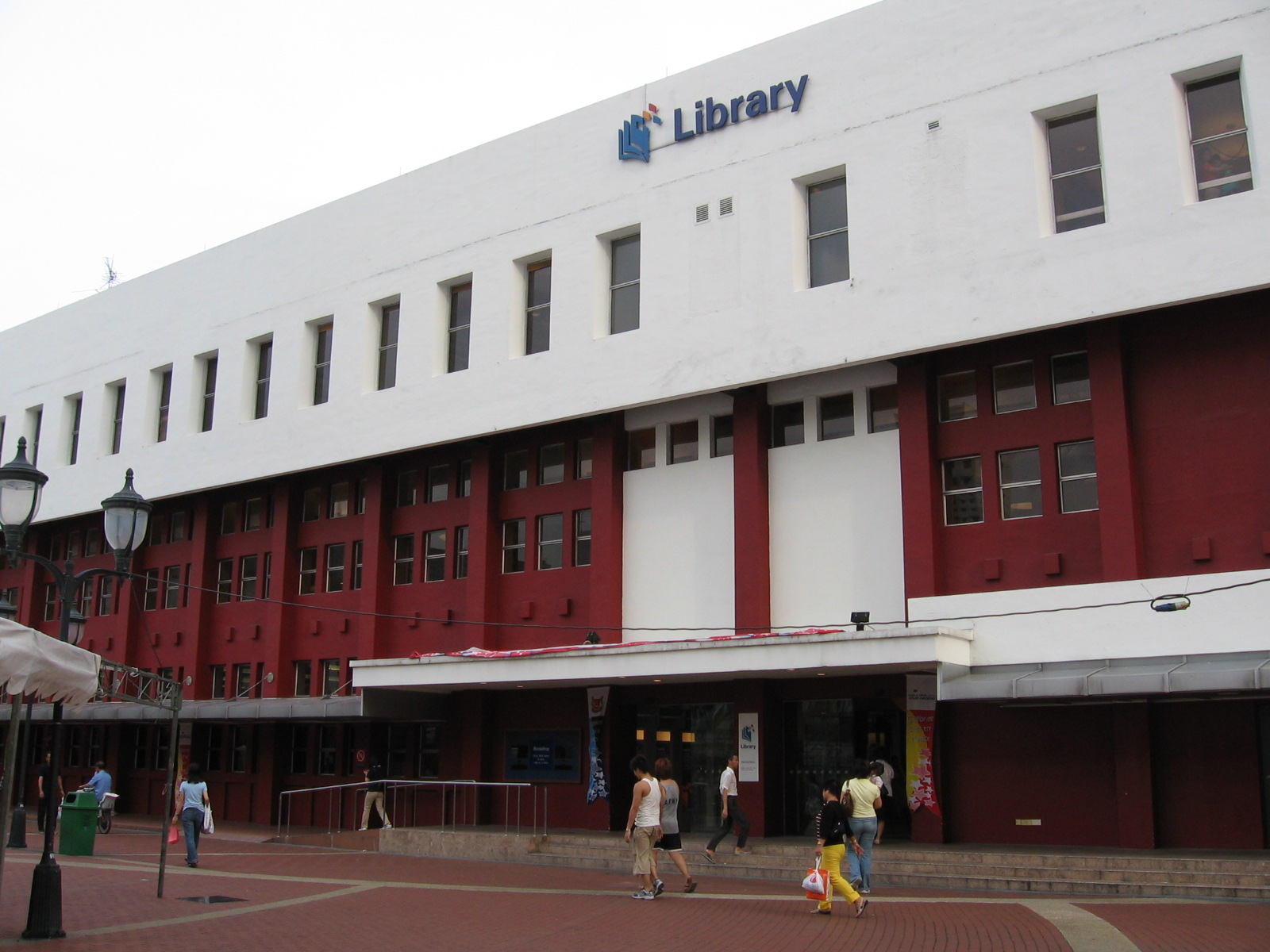
- Toa Payoh Library
- 1°20′00.6″N 103°51′01.8″E
- Location: 6 Toa Payoh Central, Singapore 319191, Singapore
- Type: Public library
- Established: 7 February 1974; 52 years ago
- Service area: Toa Payoh
- Branch of: National Library Board

The Toa Payoh Library (Chinese: 大巴窑图书馆), formerly Toa Payoh Community Library (Chinese: 大巴窑社区图书馆) and Toa Payoh Branch Library, is an established library located in the Toa Payoh Town Centre, Singapore, opened on 7 February 1974. It consists of three floors and has a large floor area of approximately 4125 m^{2}. The building which the library currently based in once housed the Southeast Asian Peninsular Games Secretariat for the 1973 Southeast Asian Peninsular Games in Singapore. The library is also within walking distance of HDB Hub, Toa Payoh Bus Interchange and Toa Payoh MRT station.

== History ==
On 19 January 1973, Toa Payoh was selected as the Games Village for the 1973 Southeast Asian Peninsular Games in Singapore, the three storey building in Toa Payoh served as the quarters for the Secretariats and the various sub-committees for the event which was held from 1 to 8 September 1973.

Following the event, the building was later converted, and opened as the Toa Payoh Branch Library on 7 February 1974 by Sha'ari Tadin, Senior Parliamentary Secretary to the Minister for Culture, in the place of Jek Yeun Thong, the then Minister for Culture. The building cost approximately $1.234 million to build the building.

In 1987, the library was closed from October 1987 to April 1988 for renovations.

It then changed its name to Toa Payoh Community Library on 1 September 1995, after the National Library Board became a statutory board.

It then went under major renovation in 1997, before reopening on 9 May 1999 by Wong Kan Seng, Minister for Home Affairs. It featured new facilities such as the Senior Citizens' Room.

== Contents ==
=== First floor ===
The first floor has a large array of story books for children 6–12 years old, and has several shelves of information books, as well as books in the four official languages of Singapore, which are English, Chinese, Malay and Tamil language.

It also has a ship structure within the Children's section, which shelves children's books and also allows children to sit in the inside. It carries the theme of "Treasure Island", which encourages the children to explore and imagine.

One can also access the neighbouring Délifrance cafe from the first floor, which is connected to the library.

=== Second floor ===
This floor has all other kinds of books, such as adult fiction, magazines, and AV materials. There are also several IT facilities on this floor, such as the Photocopying Room and the Cashcard-Top-up counter. On top of that, there is also a Senior Citizens' Room and a Newspaper Reading Room for a quiet reading environment.

This floor used to have a lot of computers on the whole floor, and less space was available for shelves and seats. These computer services were for users to have paid access to the Internet. The computers were also relatively old. However, after NLB's recent upgrading of computer services, they have reduced the number to 10, and upgraded the computers to newer ones as well.

=== Third floor ===
This floor is the Teens Zone, where there are fiction books for teenagers, as well as a large space for them to carry out project meetings.
