= Toa Payoh MRT station =

Mass Rapid Transit station in Singapore

Toa Payoh NS19 大巴窑 தோ பாயோ
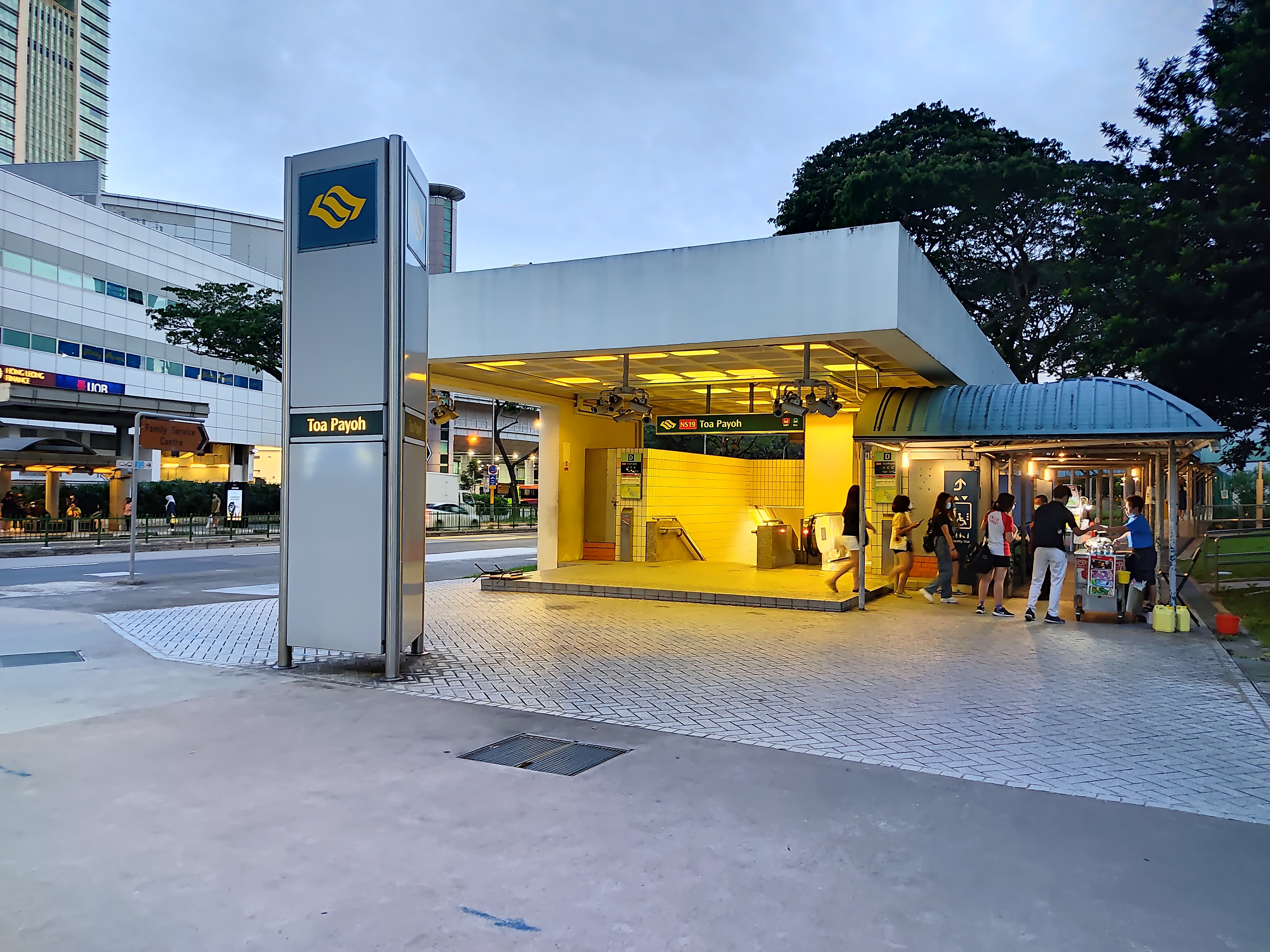
- Exit D of Toa Payoh MRT station

General information
- Location: 510 Lorong 6 Toa Payoh, Singapore 319398
- Coordinates: 01°19′58″N 103°50′51″E
- System: Mass Rapid Transit (MRT) station
- Owner: Land Transport Authority
- Operator: SMRT Trains
- Line: North–South Line
- Platforms: 2 (1 island platform)
- Tracks: 2
- Connections: Toa Payoh, Taxi

Construction
- Structure type: Underground
- Platform levels: 1
- Accessible: Yes

Other information
- Station code: TAP

History
- Opened: 7 November 1987; 38 years ago

Passengers
- June 2024: 32,943 per day

Services
Preceding station	Mass Rapid Transit	Following station
Braddell towards Jurong East	North–South Line	Novena towards Marina South Pier
Track layout
Location
- Location within Singapore Rail central area

Toa Payoh MRT station is an underground Mass Rapid Transit (MRT) station on the North–South Line (NSL) in Toa Payoh, Singapore. Located in the town centre of Toa Payoh, it is integrated with the Toa Payoh Bus Interchange and the HDB Hub, headquarters of the Housing and Development Board. The station is underneath the intersection of three roads: Lorong 1 Toa Payoh, Lorong 2 Toa Payoh and Lorong 6 Toa Payoh.

First announced in May 1982, construction of the station began in 1983 as part of Phase I of the MRT system. In August 1985, it became the first Mass Rapid Transit station in Singapore to have its concrete structure completed. It opened on 7 November 1987 and was one of the first MRT stations to operate in revenue service. It has a bright yellow scheme with a set of coloured tiles at the concourse level.

== History ==
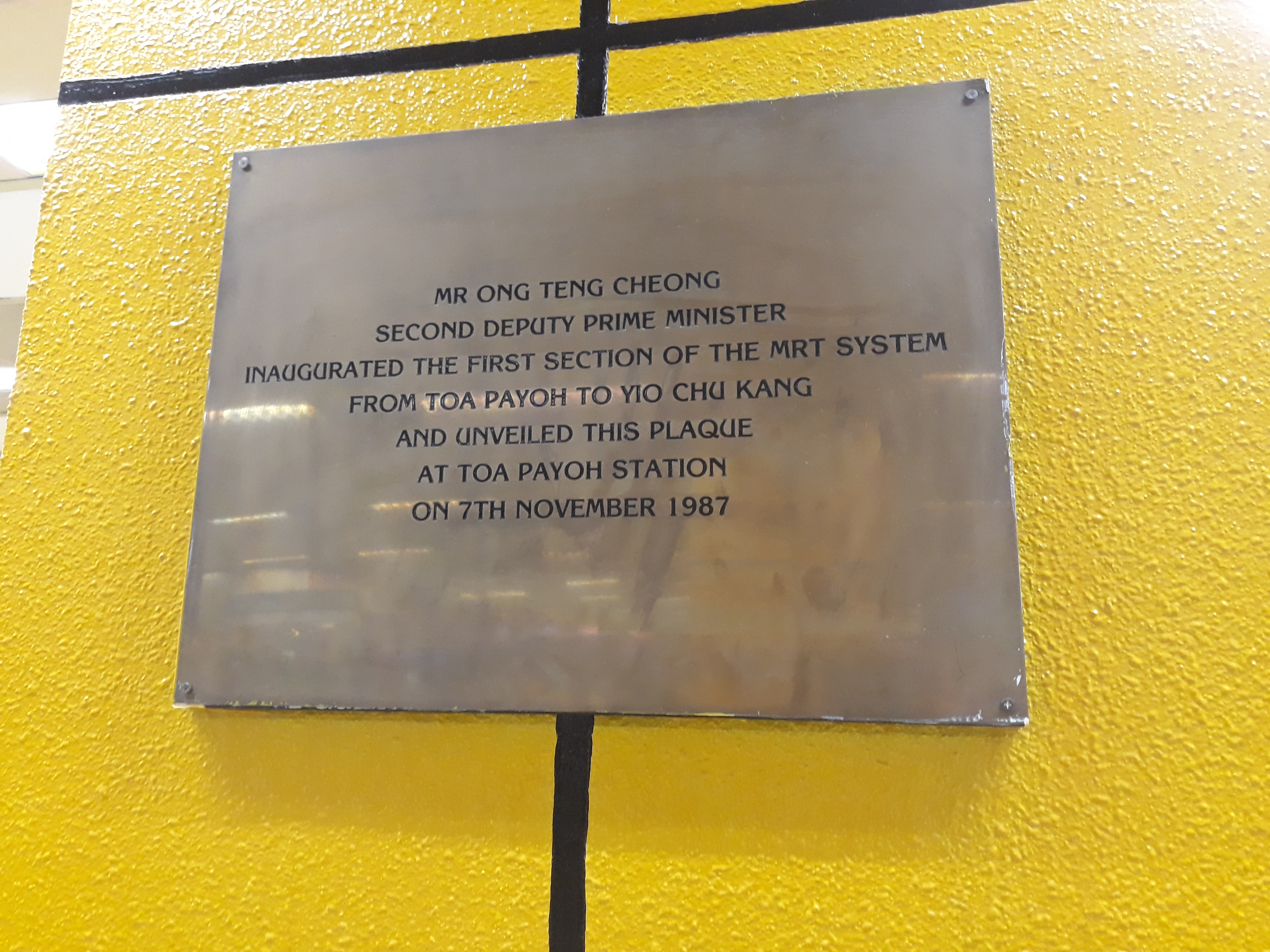
A plaque at the station commemorating the opening of the first phase of the Singapore MRT

Toa Payoh station was included in the early plans of the MRT network published in May 1982. The first confirmation that the station would be among the Phase I stations (from Ang Mo Kio to Marina Bay) came in November that year. This segment was given priority as it passed through areas that had a higher demand for public transport, such as the densely populated housing estates of Toa Payoh and Ang Mo Kio and the Central Area. The line aimed to relieve the traffic congestion on the Thomson–Sembawang road corridor.

Contract 104 for the construction of the Toa Payoh and Novena stations was awarded to Tobishima–Takenaka Joint Venture in September 1983. The S$96.8 million (US$50 million in 2022) contract included the construction of 2.329 kilometres (1.447 miles) of tunnels. Construction of the tunnels between Toa Payoh and Novena began with a groundbreaking ceremony at Shan Road on 22 October 1983. This ceremony also marked the beginning of the MRT network construction. The tunnels and the station had an expected completion date of early 1988.

The station was constructed on the site of the Toa Payoh Central bus terminal, which was relocated to an adjacent site. At Shan Road, the initial shaft was dug into a layer of sandstone. Tunnels were driven in either direction from that shaft. The composition of the ground was of either sandstone, granite, marine clay, or decomposed rocks. The sandstone sections had to be driven using a shield (with temporary shotcrete/mesh reinforcement). The granite sections had to be driven and also mined using explosives. The marine clay sections were constructed using cut-and-cover, and the decomposed rock sections used the New Austrian tunneling method (NATM).

On 6 August 1985 Toa Payoh was the first MRT station to have its structural works completed, with the final bucket of cement poured into the station as part of the topping out ceremony. Due to various soil conditions, in November 1985 the contractor requested an extension of eight months and additional monetary claims to construct the tunnels between the Novena and Toa Payoh stations.

In January 1986, it was announced that the first section of the MRT system, from the Yio Chu Kang to Toa Payoh stations, would be opened in early 1988; this was rescheduled to 7 November 1987 in an announcement in 16 September that year. In an effort to familiarise people with the system, the station hosted a preview from 10 to 11 October 1987. During the preview, about 44,000 people visited the station. However, no train services ran, much to the disappointment of many visitors. Many expressed excitement and curiosity, and many visitors bought tickets to take the MRT ride on the system's debut.

On the opening day, Toa Payoh was the most visited station on the newly completed line, with long lines outside the station by 11:00 am. At the opening ceremony, second deputy prime minister Ong Teng Cheong, who advocated for and commissioned the planning of the MRT system, attended the ceremony as a special Guest of Honour. Yeo Ning Hong, the Minister For Communications and Information, formally started MRT operations and announced it to be the "beginning" of the MRT system. On the day, the emergency button was activated at Toa Payoh station just before 8:30 pm, which halted trains for about half an hour along one of the two tracks leading to the station.

On 8 January 2006, Toa Payoh station was one of four MRT stations which participated in Exercise Northstar V, a mock counterterrorism exercise. In July 2012, the Land Transport Authority (LTA) called for a tender to enhance the flood prevention measures (such as new flood barriers) at Toa Payoh station, along with eleven other MRT stations. (Note: The other stations are Braddell, Boon Keng, Somerset, Outram Park, Tiong Bahru, Bugis, Lavender, Bishan, Marina Bay, and Changi Airport.) From July 2012 to 2014, the escalator at Exit D (the pedestrian underpass linking to Lorong 2 Toa Payoh) was replaced and upgraded.

== Station details ==
Interior views of Toa Payoh station

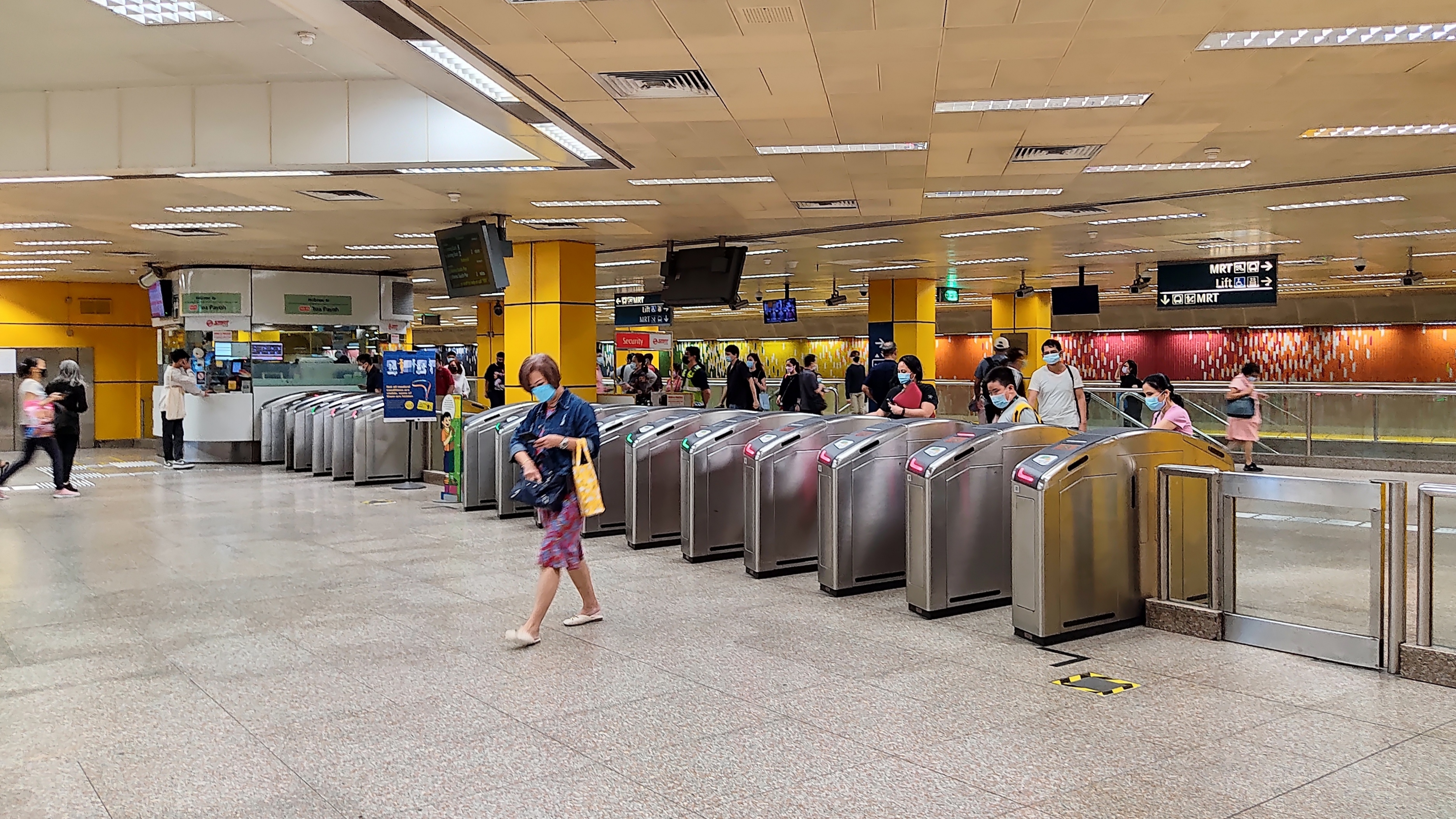
Concourse level of the station

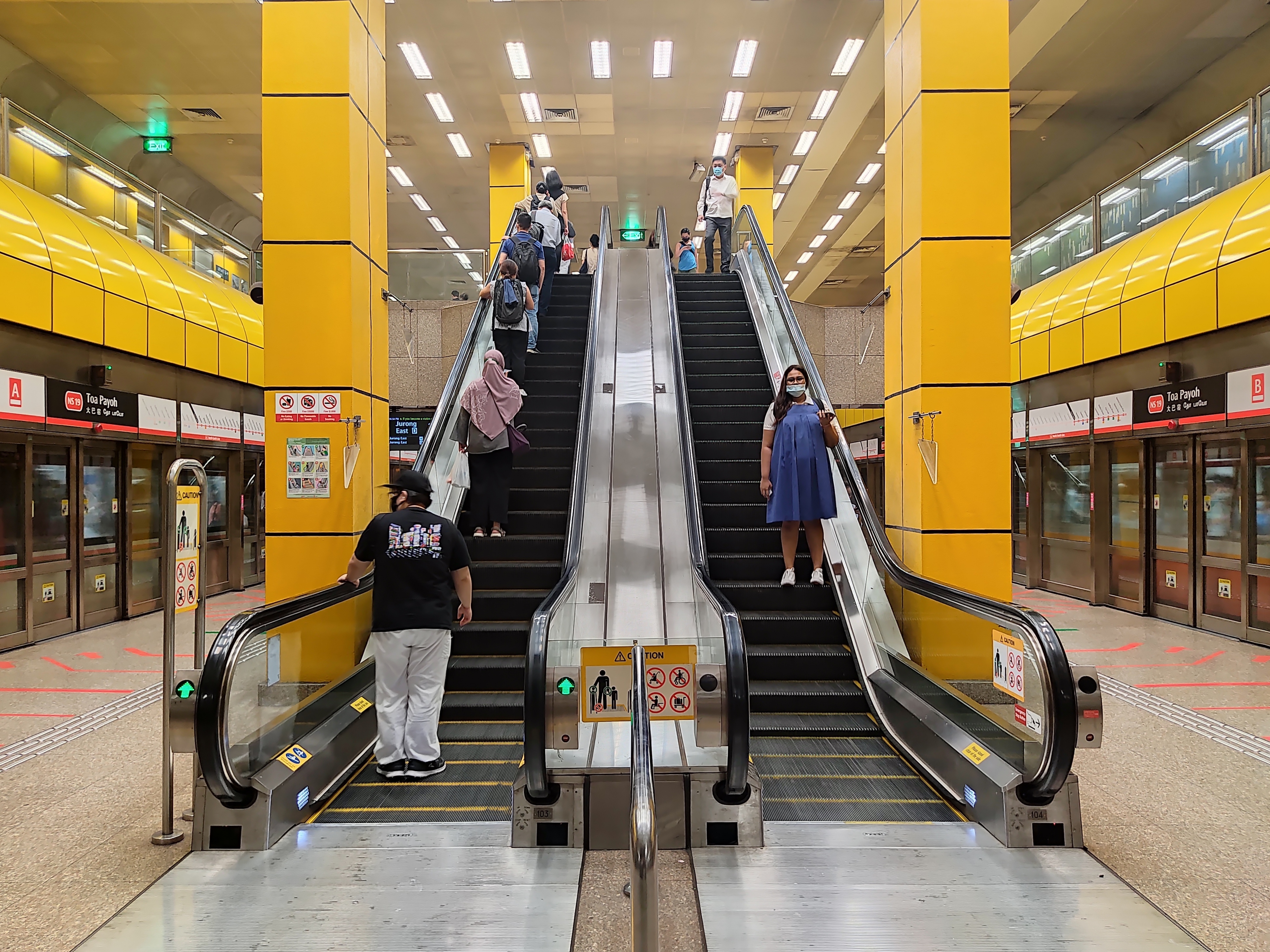
Platform level of Toa Payoh station

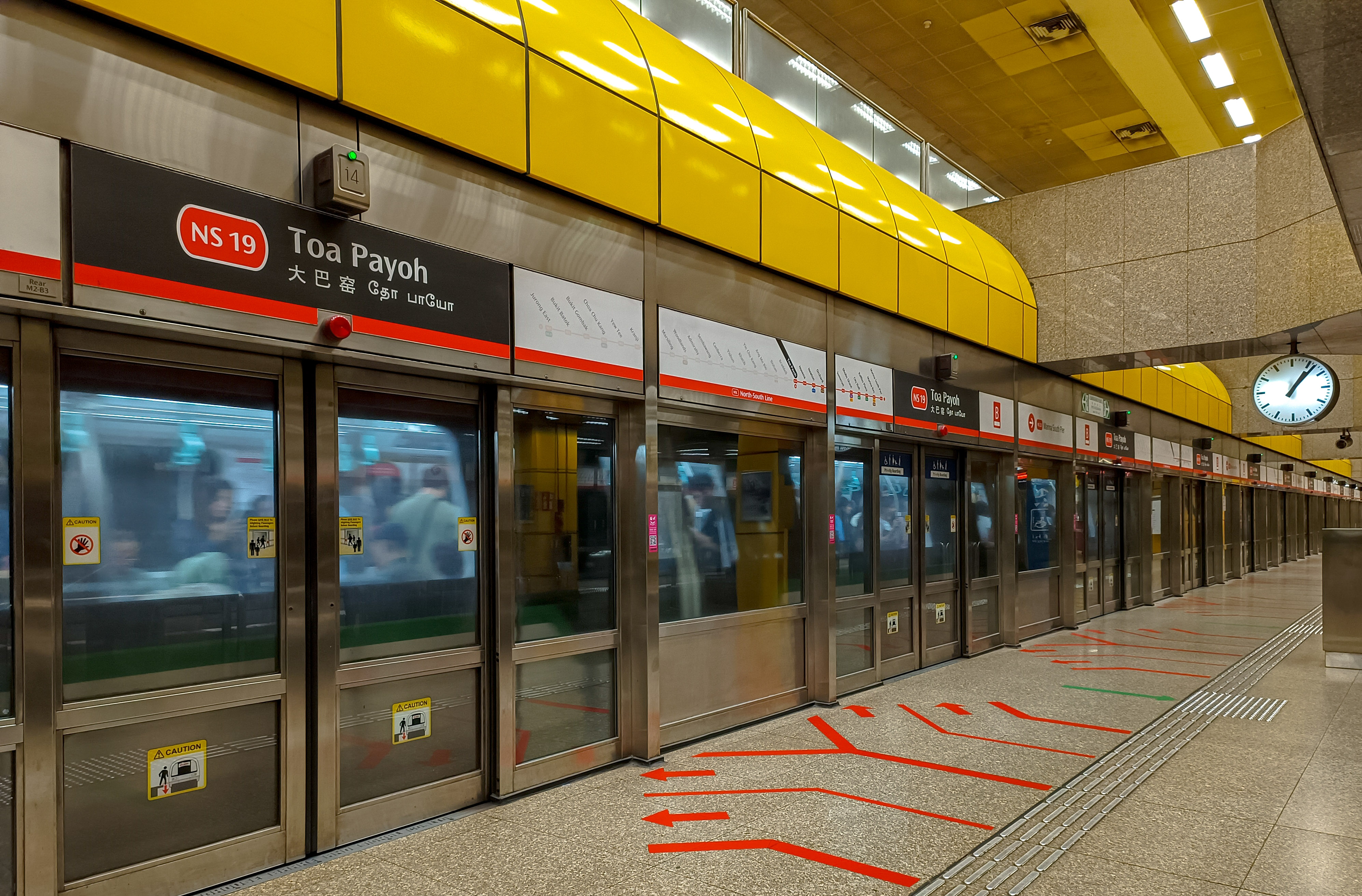

Toa Payoh serves the North–South Line (NSL) and is between the Braddell and Novena stations. The official station code is NS19. When it opened, it had the station code of N6 before being changed to its current station code in August 2001 as a part of a system-wide campaign to cater to the expanding MRT System. Like all the stations of the NSL, the station is operated by SMRT Trains. The station operates between 5:41 am and 12:25 am daily. Train frequencies vary from 2.5 to 5.0 minutes.

The station has four entrances serving the Toa Payoh area. Toa Payoh means "big swamp" in the Hokkien dialect. The name is a reference to the large swampy area which existed prior to the development of Chinese market gardens there. Surrounding landmarks include the Toa Payoh Bus Interchange, HDB Hub, Toa Payoh Library, Toa Payoh Stadium, Toa Payoh Swimming complex and the CHIJ Primary and Secondary Schools. The station is also next to two churches: the Church of the Risen Christ and Toa Payoh Methodist Church.

The underground station has a concourse on the upper level and the platforms on the lower level. Like many stations on the initial MRT network, Toa Payoh has an island platform. Toa Payoh is also one of the few stations on the initial network to have a double-height ceiling. The wide platforms and entrances were designed to accommodate huge crowds.

Toa Payoh station has a bright yellow colour scheme for the pillars and canopies. Along the 50-metre (160 ft) concourse, the station features a "rainbow dressing" mural consisting of 15,000 tiles in various colours. The rainbow mural was intended to reflect the masses of people of various racial backgrounds moving together in harmony.

As part of SMRT's Comic Connect, a public art showcase of heritage-themed murals, the station displays The Toa Payoh Story by James Suresh, Sayed Ismail and Suki Chong. The 7 metres (23 ft) long artwork depicts various landmarks of the Toa Payoh area, including the dragon playground, Shuang Lin Monastery, and the Toa Payoh Library. The mural includes the depiction of Seah Eu Chin, a businessman and landowner of the area. As Toa Payoh was the first town developed by the Housing and Development Board, the artists intended for the mural to tie the area's significance to major milestones in Singapore's history. Furthermore, they used sepia tones to "take the mural back in time" as well as making the drawing as realistic as possible to draw attention to its tiny details.
