= Toa Payoh Bus Interchange =

Bus station in Singapore

Toa Payoh Bus Interchange 大巴窑巴士转换站 Pusat Pertukaran Bas Toa Payoh
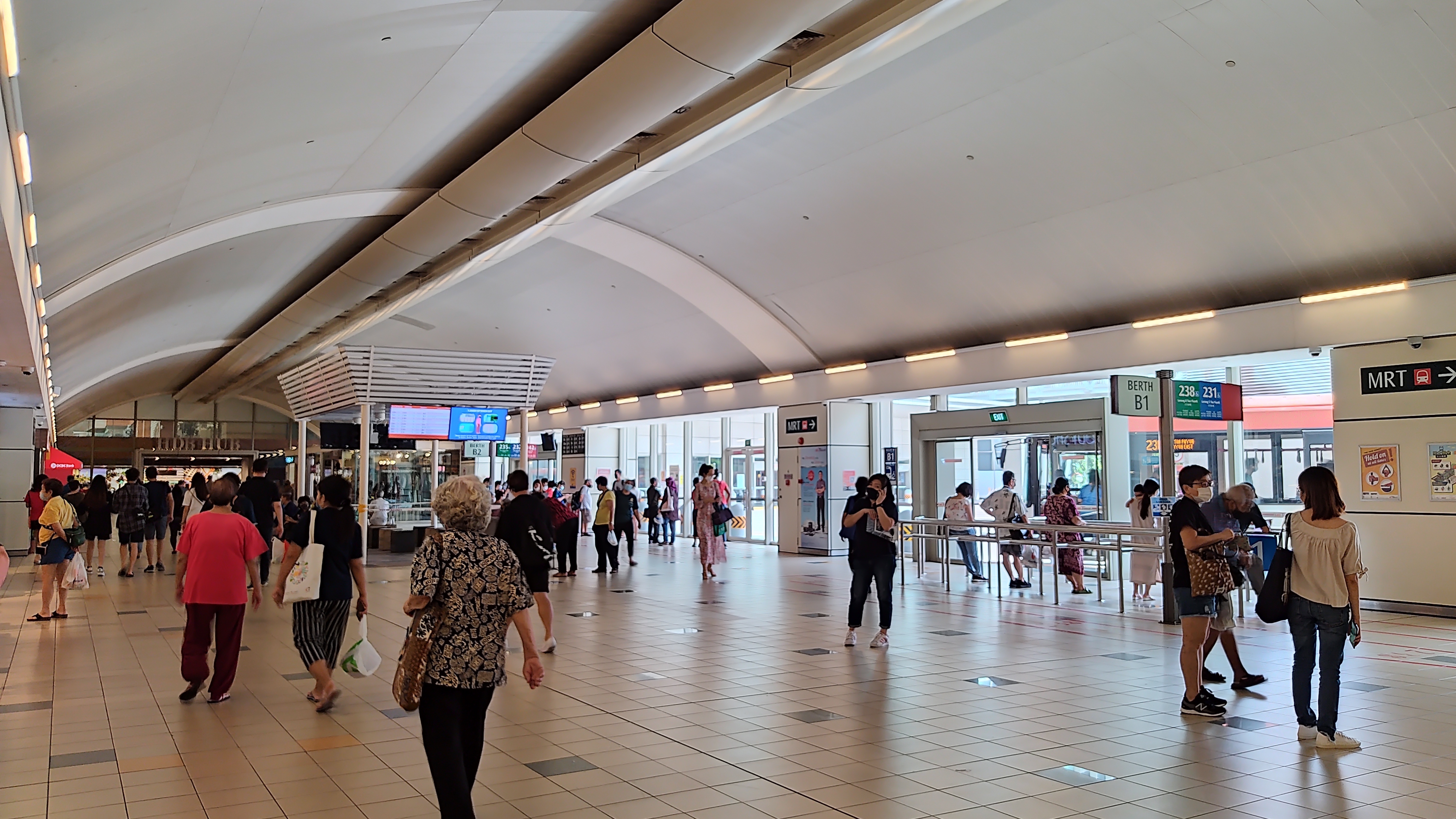
- Interior of the bus interchange.

General information
- Location: 530 Lorong 6 Toa Payoh, Singapore 310530
- System: Public Bus Interchange
- Owner: Land Transport Authority
- Operator: SBS Transit
- Bus routes: 18 (SBS Transit); 1 (Tower Transit Singapore); 2 (Go-Ahead Singapore)
- Bus stands: 4 Sawtooth; 14 End-on
- Bus operators: SBS Transit; Tower Transit Singapore; Go-Ahead Singapore
- Connections: NS19 Toa Payoh

Construction
- Structure type: At-grade
- Accessible: Accessible alighting/boarding points Accessible public toilets Graduated kerb edges Tactile guidance system

History
- Opened: 26 December 1983; 42 years ago (Old); 31 May 1998; 28 years ago (Temporary); 19 May 2002; 24 years ago (Integrated Transport Hub)
- Closed: 30 May 1998; 28 years ago (Old); 18 May 2002; 24 years ago (Temporary)

Key dates
- 26 December 1983: Commenced operations
- 31 May 1998: Operations transferred to Temporary bus interchange
- 19 May 2002: Operations transferred to new and air-conditioned bus interchange as Integrated Transport Hub

Toa Payoh Bus Interchange is an air-conditioned bus interchange located at Toa Payoh Town Centre, serving the town of Toa Payoh and Braddell. At the time of opening on 19 May 2002 by then Minister for Transport, Yeo Cheow Tong, it is the first air-conditioned bus interchange in Singapore, integrated within the Toa Payoh HDB Hub and built on top of Toa Payoh MRT station.

== History ==
=== Original interchange ===
The original interchange was built at a cost of S$2.17 million and opened on 26 December 1983. It replaced a bus terminal that had been in operation since 1971.

=== Relocation of bus interchange in 1998 ===
When the old Toa Payoh Bus Interchange was demolished on 31 May 1998 to make way for the building of HDB Hub, the new and current headquarters of the Housing and Development Board (HDB) of Singapore, the interchange operator, SBS Transit Ltd, moved its bus operations to a temporary location opposite its original site located at Toa Payoh Town Park, which was upgraded after the temporary interchange was demolished.

=== Bus interchange located in HDB Hub ===
Bus services from the temporary bus interchange moved on 19 May 2002, back to the bus interchange original site, which has a direct underground connection to Toa Payoh MRT station. It is notably the first bus interchange in Singapore to be fully air conditioned and it is housed within the building of HDB Hub.

=== Counter-terrorism exercise ===
The Toa Payoh Bus Interchange participated in the Exercise Northstar V counter-terrorism exercise on 8 January 2006, which simulated a terrorist bomb attack on various transport infrastructure, including MRT stations and bus interchanges.

=== Bomb hoax ===
Similar to other bomb hoaxes at Hougang and Jurong East, 21-year-old Lin Zhenghuang was sentenced to 3 months in jail on 7 February 2007 and fined S$4,000 for eight charges under the Computer Misuse Act. The charges were for 'mooching' or illegally tapping into his neighbour's unsecured wireless internet network and posting a bomb hoax on an online forum of popular technology site HardwareZone. Lin previously pleaded guilty to one charge under the Telecommunications Act for transmitting a false message and nine charges under the Computer Misuse Act. The accused posted a message on 22 July 2005, reporting that there had been a bomb attack at Toa Payoh Bus Interchange.

== Bus contracting model ==
Under the bus contracting model, all bus services operating from Toa Payoh Bus Interchange were divided into six bus packages, operated by three bus operators until June 2027, from which SMRT Buses will take over the Serangoon-Eunos bus package, bringing the total to 4 operators. Toa Payoh Bus Interchange is primarily run by the operator of Bishan-Toa Payoh bus package, which currently is SBS Transit.

=== List of bus services ===
Operator	Package	Routes
Go-Ahead Singapore	Tampines	28, 31
SBS Transit	Bishan-Toa Payoh	8, 26, 73 (Note: Bus service 73 does not terminate at Toa Payoh Interchange. Instead, it loops within the interchange back to Ang Mo Kio Bus Interchange.), 88, 139, 139A, 142, 142A, 155, 157, 230M, 231, 232, 235, 238
SBS Transit	Bukit Merah	145
SBS Transit	Sengkang-Hougang	159, 163
SBS Transit	Serangoon-Eunos	90, 141 (Until June 2027)
SMRT Buses	Serangoon-Eunos	90, 141 (From June 2027)
Tower Transit Singapore	Bulim	143

The following is the berth allocation of bus services in Toa Payoh Interchange, as of 31 August 2026.

Berth Type	End-on														Linear	Sawtooth			
Berth Number	A1	A2	A3	A4	A5	A6	A7	A8	A9	A10	A11	A12	A13	A14	For Alighting	B1	B2	B3	B4
Bus service(s)	143	139/139A	145	-	8	90/90A	Upgrading works since 24 Oct 2026	155	88	-	141	26	28	31	-	142/142A, 231, 238	230M, 232, 235	73, 163	157, 159
