= Cheng San Public Library =

Public library in Singapore

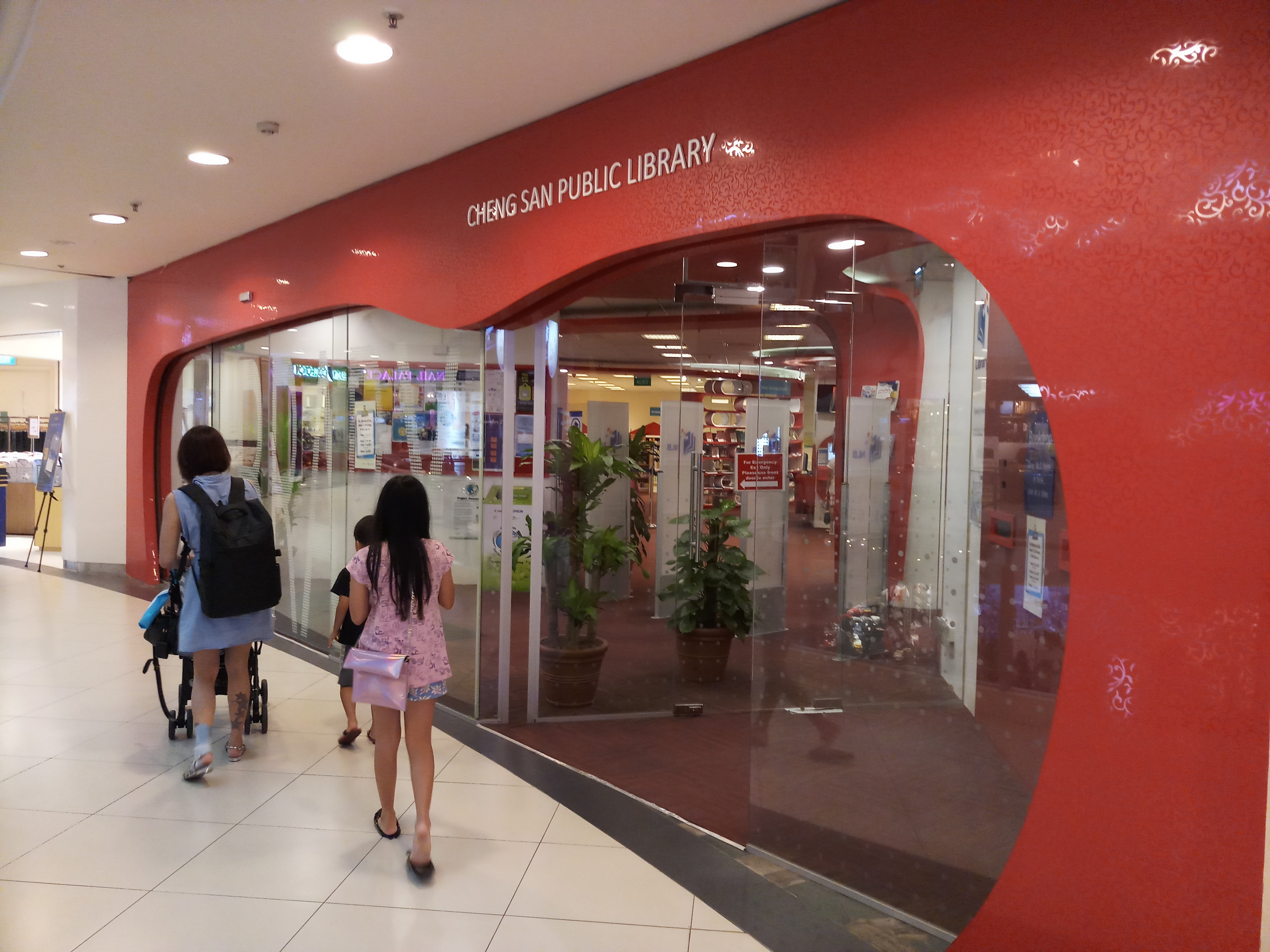
- Cheng San Public Library
- 1°22′20.85″N 103°53′38.00″E
- Location: 90 Hougang Avenue 10, #03-11, Hougang Mall, Singapore 538766, Singapore
- Type: Public library
- Established: 6 March 1997; 29 years ago
- Branch of: National Library Board

Cheng San Public Library is a public library in Hougang, located inside Hougang Mall. It is the third library of the National Library Board to be located in a mall and the first to acquire and display works by local artists. It is near Hougang MRT station and Hougang Central Bus Interchange.

== History ==
Officially opened on 6 March 1997 by Zainul Abidin, Member of Parliament for Cheng San GRC (Punggol East), Cheng San Public Library serves the residents of Hougang, Cheng San, Serangoon Central and Upper Paya Lebar. Originally known as Cheng San Community Library, it was renamed as Cheng San Public Library in 2008.

== Layout ==
Covering an area of 1467 m^{2}, it contains a children’s section, a new arrivals section, a newspaper reading corner and an adult section on level 3 of the mall.

== See also ==
- National Library Board
- List of libraries in Singapore
