= CSPL =

CSPL may refer to:

- Cheng San Public Library, a public library in Hougang, Singapore
- Committee on Standards in Public Life, an advisory non-departmental public body of the United Kingdom Government
