= Kovan MRT station =

Mass Rapid Transit station in Singapore

Kovan NE13 高文 கோவன்
- Exit C of Kovan MRT station

General information
- Location: 900 Upper Serangoon Road, Singapore 534799
- Coordinates: 01°21′37″N 103°53′06″E
- System: Mass Rapid Transit (MRT) station
- Owner: Land Transport Authority
- Operator: SBS Transit
- Line: North East Line
- Platforms: 2 (1 island platform)
- Tracks: 2
- Connections: Bus, Taxi

Construction
- Structure type: Underground
- Platform levels: 1
- Parking: Yes (Heartland Mall)
- Accessible: Yes

Other information
- Station code: KVN

History
- Opened: 20 June 2003; 23 years ago

Passengers
- June 2024: 19,989 per day

Services
Preceding station	Mass Rapid Transit	Following station
Serangoon towards HarbourFront	North East Line	Hougang towards Punggol Coast
Track layout
Location
- Location within Singapore Rail

Kovan MRT station is an underground Mass Rapid Transit (MRT) station on the North East Line (NEL) in Hougang, Singapore. Located underneath Upper Serangoon Road, the station serves the retail development of Heartland Mall and surrounding public and private residences.

First announced in March 1996, the station commenced operations on 20 June 2003. Its construction required multiple diversions of Upper Serangoon Road. Like all stations on the NEL, Kovan station is operated by SBS Transit. The station features an artwork The Trade-off by Eng Tow as part of the network's Art-in-Transit programme.

== History ==
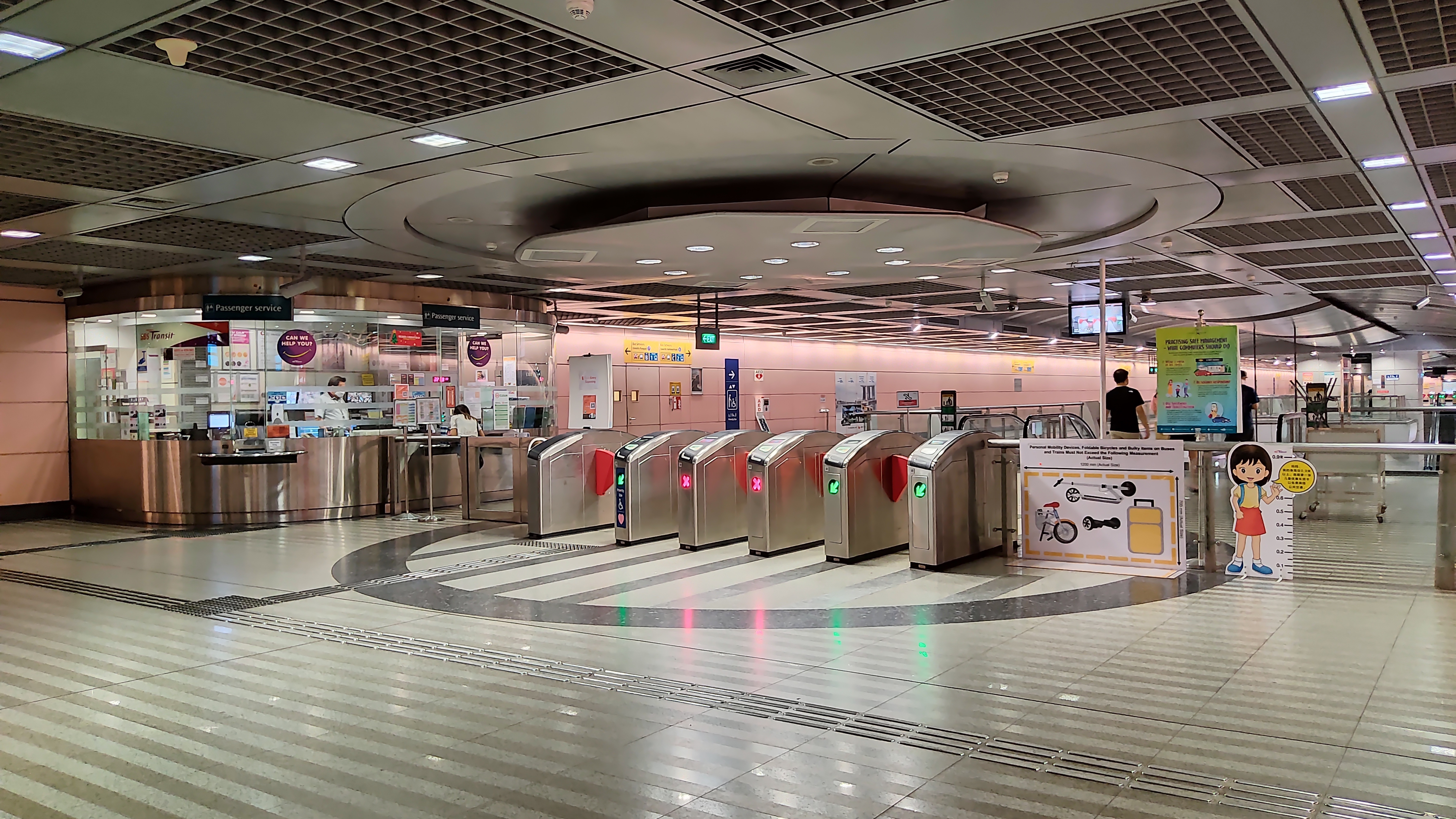
Concourse level of Kovan station

The announcement of Kovan station, along with the other NEL stations, in March 1996 caught the residents around the site by "surprise", as it was assumed there would be only one station in Hougang near the Hougang Central Bus Interchange. Many of the residents were reported to be "happy" as the NEL is expected to address their "transport woes" in the Upper Serangoon area.

Contract C703 for the design and construction of the two-level Civil Defence underground stations (Kovan and Hougang) was awarded to Samsung Corporation Engineering & Construction Group at a contract sum of S$214.8 million (US$144.7 million) in May 1997. The contract included the construction of 1.3-kilometre (0.81-mile) twin-bored tunnels and 700 metres (770 yd) of cut-and-cover tunnels.

As the location of the utility pipes at the site was not well documented, the contractor had to manually excavate the site using equipment to determine their location, mitigating any damage to the pipes. After the pipes were unearthed, mechanised excavation could begin. To facilitate the station's construction and further development of the site, some residences, businesses and a temple had been bought over.

During the MRT construction, a section of Upper Serangoon Road had to be realigned several times for the excavation works. Nevertheless, as the work was well-coordinated, little impact was made to the traffic as much as possible. Road capacity was "by and large" unaffected as most of the work was carried out underneath a metal decking. To avoid causing further inconvenience, the Land Transport Authority (LTA) also ensured that the carpark along Hougang Street 21 remained accessible for residents to carry out their daily activities without needing to park further away.

The station opened on 20 June 2003 along with the other NEL stations. In light of the station's opening, the retail mall (renamed Heartland Mall Kovan) next to the station was renovated greatly, thus inviting chains such as Cold Storage and Pizza Hut to operate at the mall. In April 2011, a new lift and ramp were constructed which allowed barrier-free access to both sides of the station.

== Station details ==
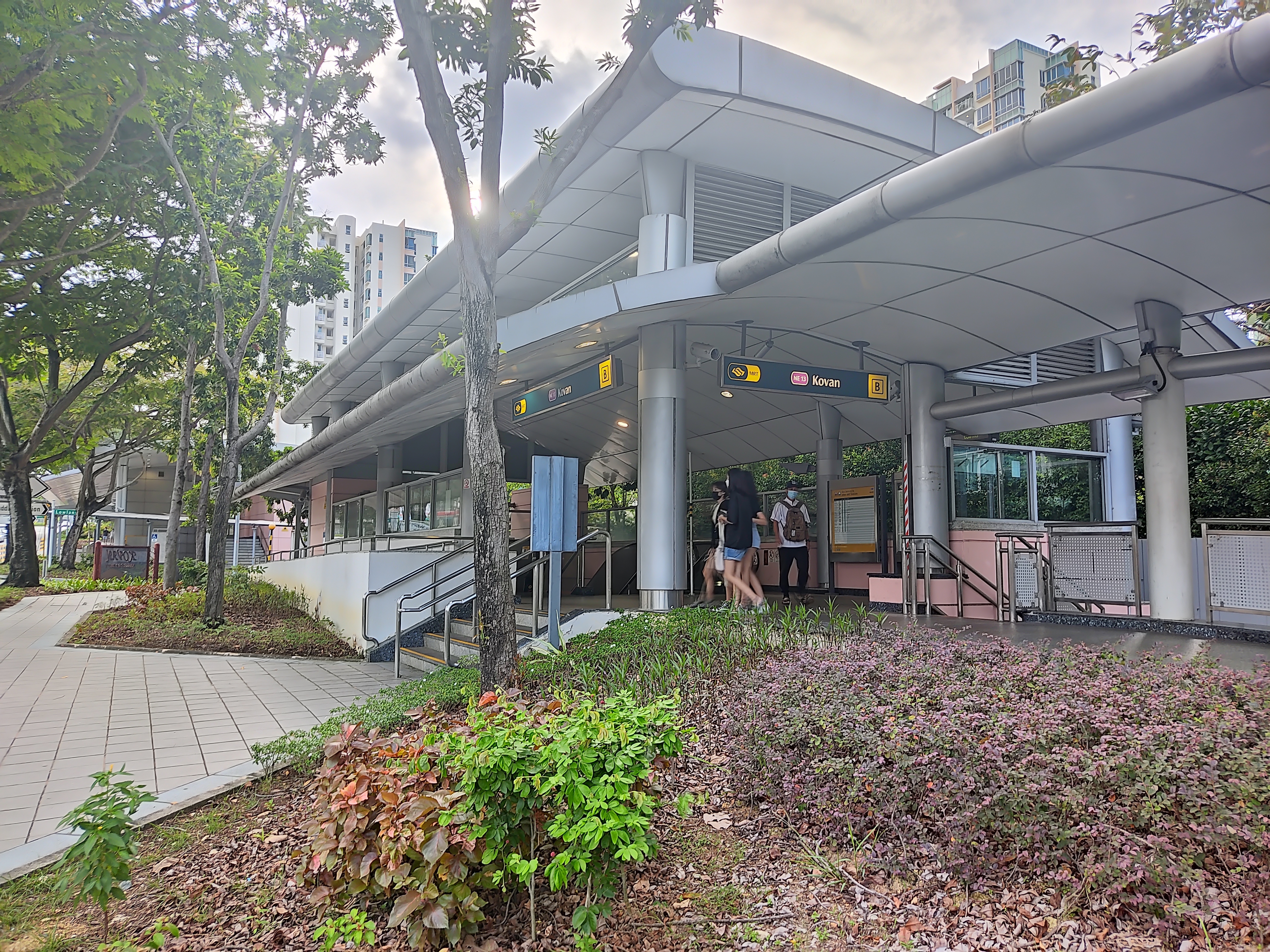
Exit B of the station

The station is located in the Kovan neighbourhood underneath Upper Serangoon Road. The serves the residential developments of Kovan Melody and Kovan Residences, the retail development of Heartland Mall, and is close to the Kovan Market and Food Centre and the Paya Lebar Community Club.

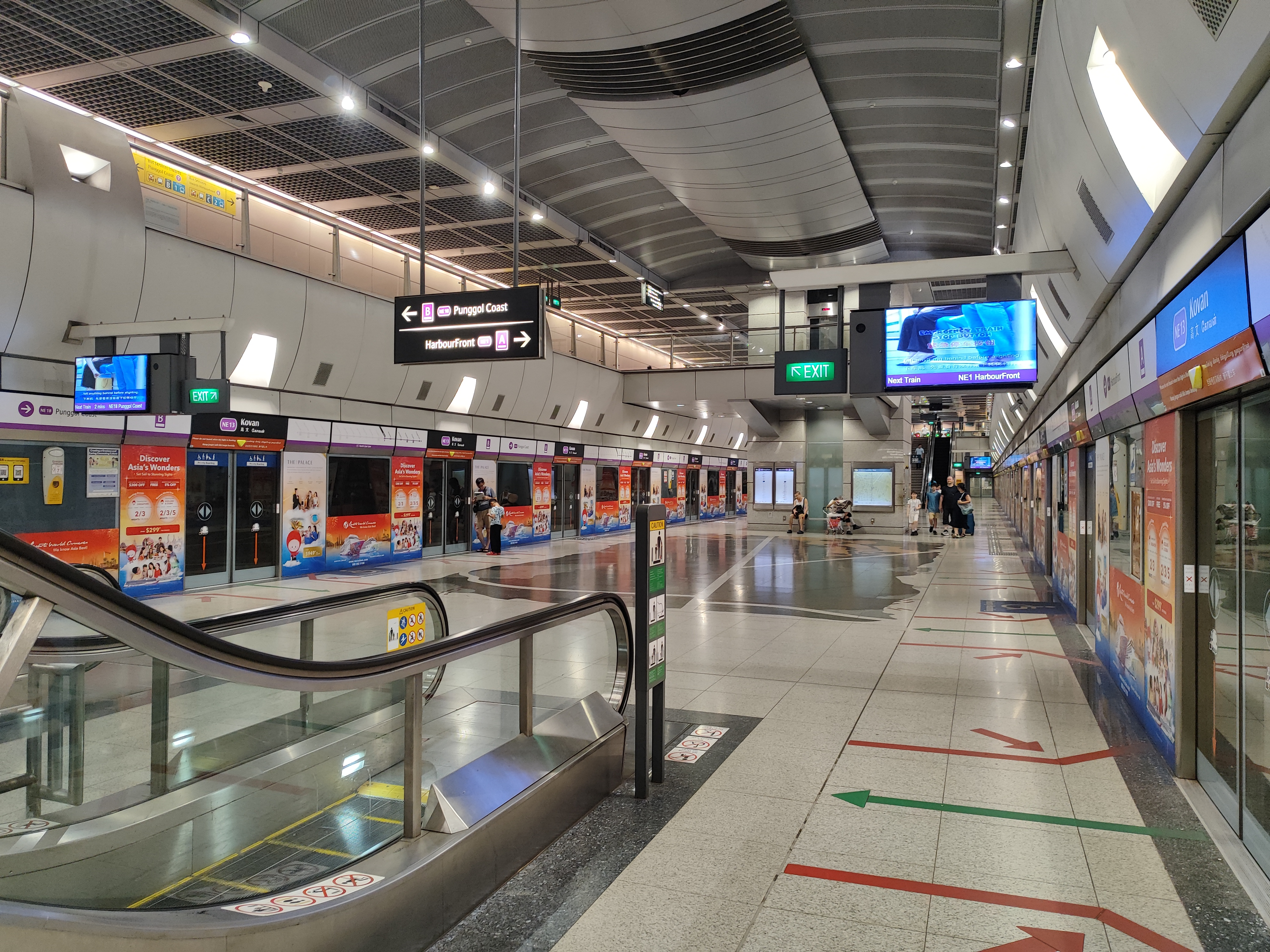
Platform level of Kovan station

Kovan station serves the North East Line (NEL) between the Serangoon and Hougang stations. The official station code is NE13. The station operates between 5.51 am and 12.21 am daily with headways of 2.5 to 5 minutes depending on peak hours. The station has three entrances and two underground levels. The three entrances of the station have a steel structure with a curved aluminium roof intended to create a "streamlined effect". In addition, to create a spacious interior, there are no pillars in the station.

The NEL station is designated as a Civil Defence (CD) shelter. It is designed to accommodate at least 7,500 people and can withstand airstrikes and chemical attacks. Equipment essential for the operations in the CD shelter is mounted on shock absorbers to prevent damage during a bombing. When electrical supply to the shelter is disrupted, there are backup generators to keep operations going. The shelter has dedicated built-in decontamination chambers and dry toilets with collection bins that will send human waste out of the shelter.

The platforms are wheelchair-accessible. A tactile system, consisting of tiles with rounded or elongated raised studs, guides visually impaired commuters through the station. Dedicated routes connect the station entrances to the platforms or between the lines.

=== Public artwork ===
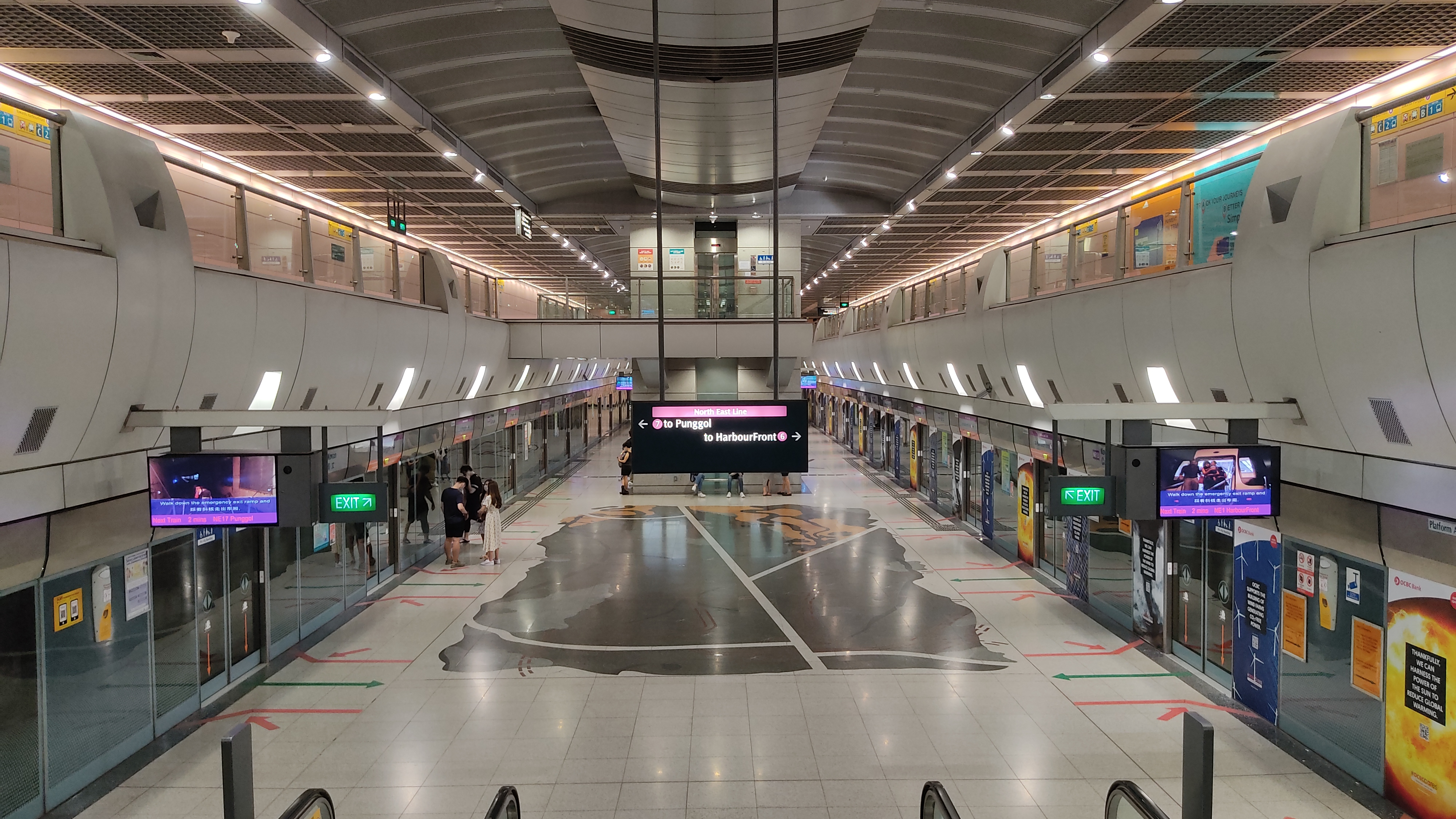
The artwork at the platform level

The artwork The Trade-off by Eng Tow is displayed at this station as part of the MRT network's Art-in-Transit (AiT) programme. (Note: Public art showcase which integrates artworks into the MRT network) The artwork includes two maps reflecting the "time and progress" of the Kovan area. One map, representing the past, depicts natural areas such as mangrove swamps, forests, plantations and water bodies around what are now two arterial roads, Serangoon Road and Tampines Road. The other map, representing the present, does not display vegetation, showing only the new roads, expressways and new developments. Ochre, black, dark green, red and grey colours were used to reflect earth tones. These colours were laid upon granite, a material which is indigenous to Singapore and which many Singaporeans are familiar with. The tiles were cut using computer-controlled water jets, a construction technology new to Singapore, and were connected as in a jigsaw puzzle before displayed on the platforms.

In creating the artwork, Eng contrasted the styles of the two maps to show how Singapore's way of life had improved through development, transportation and globalisation. The map depicting the past is designed in a "curvilinear and organic" style while the modern map contains a "geometrical" style. In her work, Eng also considered LTA's goal in the AiT programme – to allow commuters to interact with the artwork. The positioning of the work within a station had a somewhat ironic tone, since the station was the "embodiment" of a fast-paced lifestyle, with travellers using direct routes to their destinations without stopping.

Before commencing the concept, Eng researched the area's history through the archives. She made some discoveries that she found interesting, such as the fact that the area had been a watershed that began at Paya Lebar and ended at the Singapore River. Eng had initially wished to accompany the artwork with wall panels engraved with cartographic symbols, which in turn would be inspired by icons in older maps indicating agricultural uses, such as plantations and orchards, around the area. However, the idea was not considered feasible because of the station's mechanical and engineering criteria. Instead, the icons were inscribed in stainless steel and randomly distributed across the floor of the concourse level. Each of the three entrances has a unique symbol to "subtly" aid commuters in identifying the entrances.

The Trade-off has been "widely regarded" as one of the more "sophisticated, thoughtful artwork" on the NEL. A member of the Art Review Panel, Joseph McNally, remarked that the work had a degree of sophistication not seen in other public works. The work offers a view of the area and its heritage, while "standing on its artistic merit". Eng said she did not expect commuters to immediately understand the purpose of the work, saying that people might only discover the maps after "years of travelling" through the station. She hoped that, when commuters did notice the work, it would "light up" their commute and urge them to think about the artwork's message.
