= Hougang Mall =

Shopping center in Hougang, Singapore

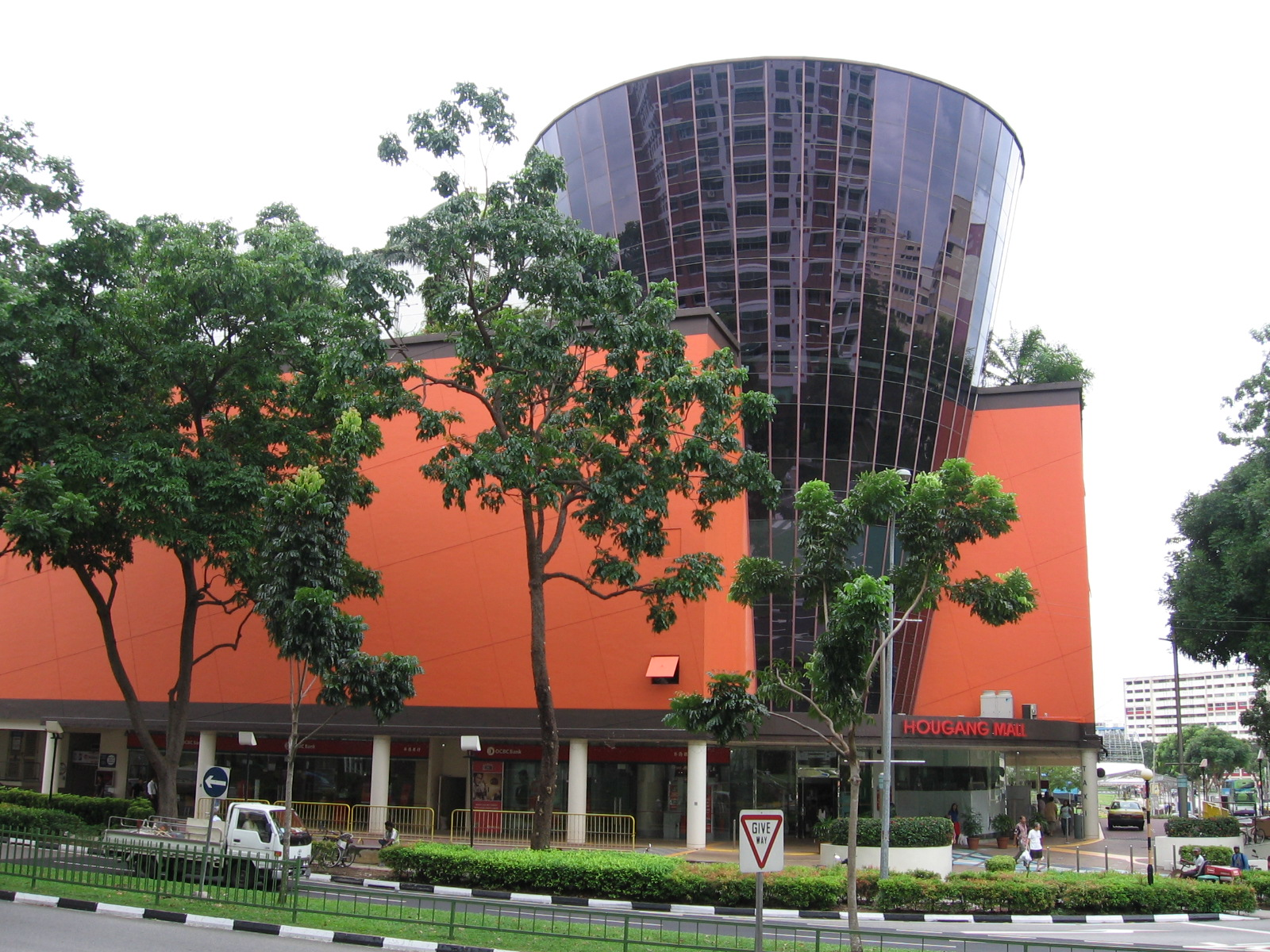
- Hougang Mall
- Location: 90 Hougang Avenue 10, Singapore 538766
- Coordinates: 1°22′21.35″N 103°53′36.62″E
- Opened: 1997; 29 years ago
- Manager: Frasers Property
- Owner: ARMF (Hougang Mall) Private Limited
- Num. of stores: 134
- Num. of anchor tenants: 4
- Floor area: 217,000 square feet (20,200 m^{2})
- Floors: 7
- Public transit: NE14 CR8 Hougang
- Website: www.hougangmall.com.sg

Hougang Mall (Chinese: 后港购物坊), previously known as NTUC Hougang Mall, is a suburban shopping mall in Hougang, Singapore. It is near Hougang Central Bus Interchange, as well as Hougang MRT station.

In 2006, the mall underwent renovation; it transformed part of the second level, formerly occupied by NTUC FairPrice, into a food cluster. The mall previously had renovations done on the fifth level.

Before renovations, a food court stood on the fifth floor. Now, a playground (on the roof which offers a good view of the surrounding HDB flats), and some other shops are on the fifth floor while the food court was shifted to level 4 to the area which previously housed the NTUC Club.

In October 2020, Frasers Property acquired Hougang Mall, which was previously under AsiaMalls Management Limited, under its property.

The mall began renovations, termed as asset enhancement works, from the 2nd quarter of 2025, aiming to complete by the 3rd quarter of 2026.
