= Defu Industrial Park =

Defu
- Subzone of Hougang Planning Area

Name transcription(s)
  - Chinese: 德福
  - Malay: Defu
  - Tamil: டெஃபு
- Interactive map of Defu
- Coordinates: 1.3499°N 103.8858°E
- Country: Singapore
- Planning area: Hougang Planning Area

Defu Industrial Park is an industrial estate, a subzone of Hougang in the northeast region of Singapore, located at the fringe of Hougang New Town.
