= Hougang MRT station =

Mass Rapid Transit station in Singapore

Hougang NE14 CR8 后港 ஹவ்காங்
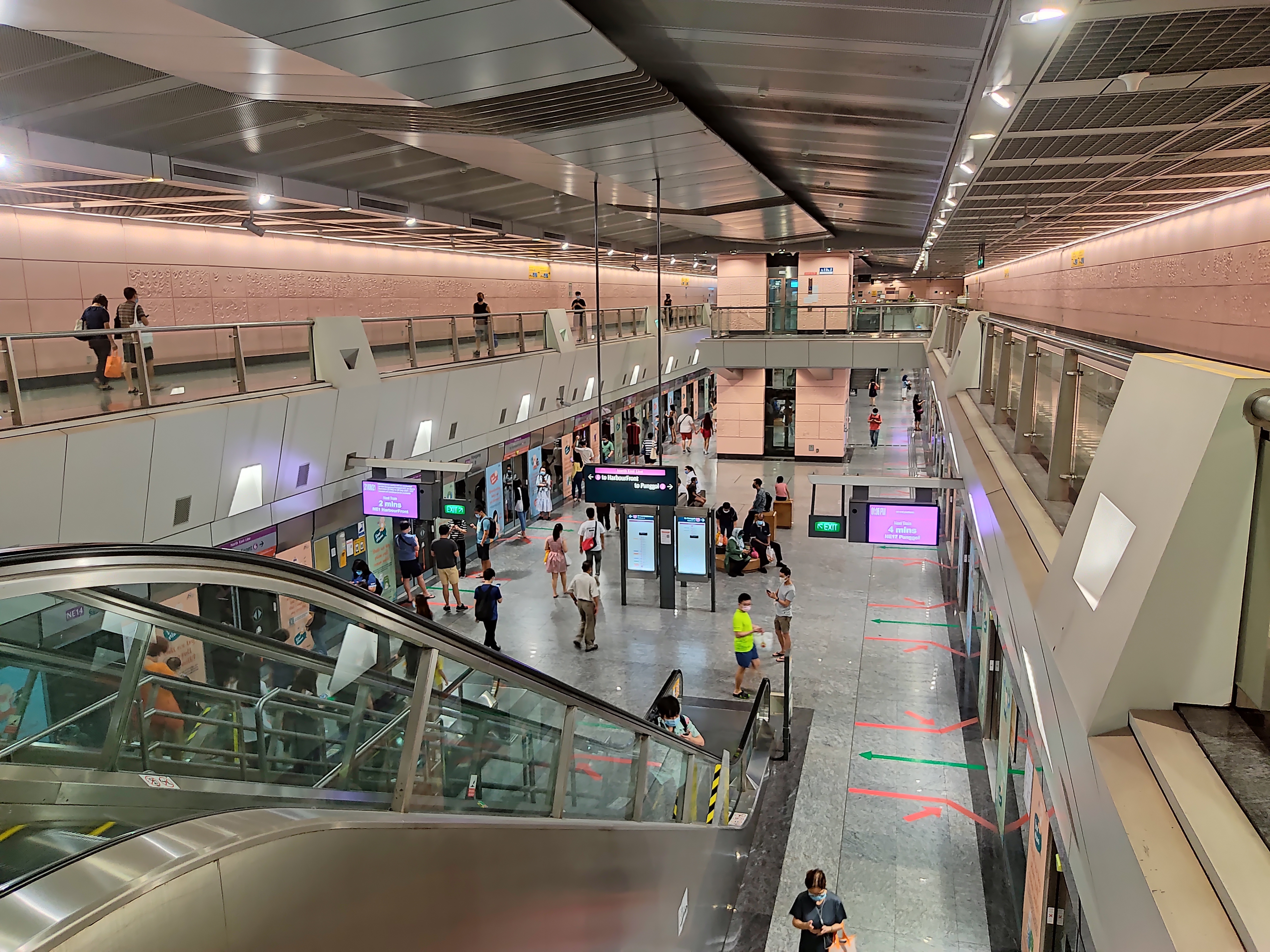
- Platform level of Hougang MRT station

General information
- Location: 80 Hougang Central, Singapore 538758 (NEL)
- Coordinates: 01°22′17″N 103°53′32″E
- System: Mass Rapid Transit (MRT) station
- Owner: Land Transport Authority
- Operator: SBS Transit
- Line: North East Line Cross Island Line
- Platforms: 2 (1 island platform) + 2 (1 island platform) (U/C)
- Tracks: 2 + 2 (U/C)
- Connections: Hougang Central, Taxi

Construction
- Structure type: Underground
- Depth: 45 metres (148 ft)
- Platform levels: 1 + 1 (U/C)
- Parking: Yes (Hougang Mall)
- Accessible: Yes

Other information
- Station code: HGN

History
- Opened: 20 June 2003; 23 years ago (North East Line)
- Opening: 2030; 4 years' time (Cross Island Line)

Passengers
- June 2024: 28,153 per day

Services
Preceding station	Mass Rapid Transit	Following station
Kovan towards HarbourFront	North East Line	Buangkok towards Punggol Coast
Defu towards Aviation Park	Cross Island Line Future service	Serangoon North towards Bright Hill
Track layout
Location
- Location within Singapore Rail

Hougang MRT station (/ˌ(h)aʊˈkɑːŋ/ (Note: With an unaspirated [k], like the k in sky.)) is an underground Mass Rapid Transit (MRT) station on the North East Line (NEL) in Hougang, Singapore. Located underneath Hougang Central and Hougang Central Bus Interchange, the station serves various landmarks, including Hougang Mall and Hougang Sports Hall.

Hougang was first announced along with the 16 NEL stations in March 1996 and was completed on 20 June 2003. Constructing the NEL station required the relocation of Hougang Bus Interchange and a retirement home. In January 2019, it was announced that the station will interchange with the future Cross Island Line (CRL). As with most NEL stations, it is a designated Civil Defence shelter. Hougang station features the public artwork Hands Up For Hougang by Seck Yok Ying, a series of 3000 handprints.

== History ==
=== North East Line ===
The North East Line (NEL) project, which was first proposed in 1984, received government approval in January 1996. Hougang station was among the sixteen NEL stations announced by communications minister Mah Bow Tan in March that year. The contract for the design and construction of the Hougang and Kovan stations was awarded to Samsung Corporation Engineering & Construction Group (later Samsung C&T Corporation) for S$214.8 million (US$144.7 million) in May 1997. The contract included the construction of 1.3-kilometre (0.81-mile) twin-bored tunnels and 700 metres (770 yd) of cut-and-cover tunnels. The station opened on 20 June 2003 along with the other NEL stations.

To excavate the site needed for the station's construction, the Hougang Bus Interchange had to be relocated. This also required multiple route diversions of bus services and new bus stops, including three temporary ones leading to the interchange. The bus interchange moved back to its original site on 20 May 2001. The Home for the Aged Sick, a retirement home near the station site, also had to be relocated as the Land Transport Authority (LTA) feared the noise and dust would impact the residents' health. Many residents moved to a block at the Kwong Wai Shiu Hospital on Serangoon Road, although some had to be sent to other homes due to limited capacity. All residents eventually moved to its present site at Hougang Avenue 1 in 1999. Part of the construction works included tunnelling underneath terrace houses in Realty Park 13 metres (43 ft) underground. LTA installed various instruments to closely monitor any ground settlement, preventing structural damage to the surrounding buildings.

=== Cross Island Line ===
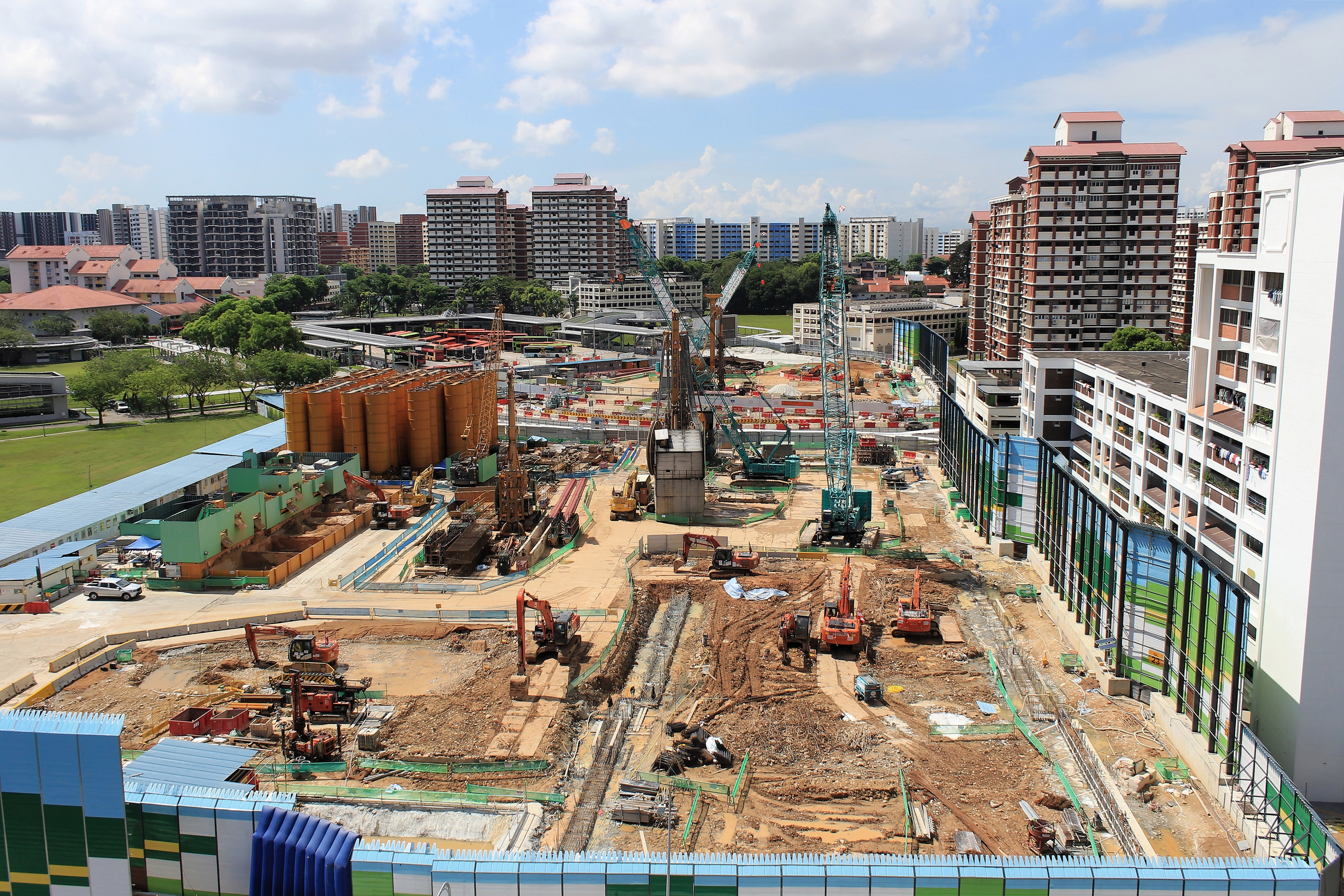
Construction site of the CRL station

On 25 January 2019, the LTA announced that Hougang station would interchange with the proposed Cross Island Line (CRL). The station will be constructed as part of Phase 1 (CRL1), which will consist of 12 stations between Aviation Park and Bright Hill. CRL1 was expected to be completed in 2029. However, the restrictions imposed on construction works due to the COVID-19 pandemic led to delays and the CRL1 completion date was pushed by one year to 2030.

The contract for the design and construction of Hougang CRL Station and it associated tunnels was awarded to Samsung C&T Corporation for S$604 million (US$450.7 million) in March 2021. Besides the construction of the new station and tunnels, the works include alteration works to the existing NEL station. Construction began in the third quarter of 2021, with a scheduled completion date of 2030. A segment of Hougang Central was closed from 28 August 2022 to facilitate construction works for the CRL. In 2024, it was announced that a new mixed-use development integrated with a bus interchange would be built on the land parcel bounded by Hougang Avenue 10 and Hougang Central, with the CRL station being directly connected to the interchange, as part of plans to develop the future Hougang Central Integrated Transport Hub.

== Details ==
Hougang station serves the North East Line (NEL) between the Buangkok and Kovan stations. The official station code is NE14. The station operates between 5.48 am and 12.25 am daily with headways of 2.5 to 5 minutes depending on peak hours.

Located underneath Hougang Central, the station is directly integrated with Hougang Central Bus Interchange. The two-level station has three entrances, one of which has a circular roof to give the station a modern look. Other public amenities surrounding the station include Hougang Polyclinic, Hougang Sports Hall and Aljunied–Hougang Town Council. The station is also near Hougang Mall and residential developments such as Midtown Residences.

The NEL station is designated as a Civil Defence shelter. It is designed to accommodate at least 7,500 people and can withstand airstrikes and chemical attacks. Equipment essential for the operations in the Civil Defence shelter is mounted on shock absorbers to prevent damage during a bombing. When the electrical supply to the shelter is disrupted, there are backup generators to keep operations going. The shelter has dedicated built-in decontamination chambers, as well as dry toilets with collection bins used to send human waste out of the shelter.

The platforms are wheelchair-accessible. A tactile system, consisting of tiles with rounded or elongated raised studs, guides visually impaired commuters through the station. Dedicated routes connect the station entrances to the platforms or between the lines.

=== Artwork ===
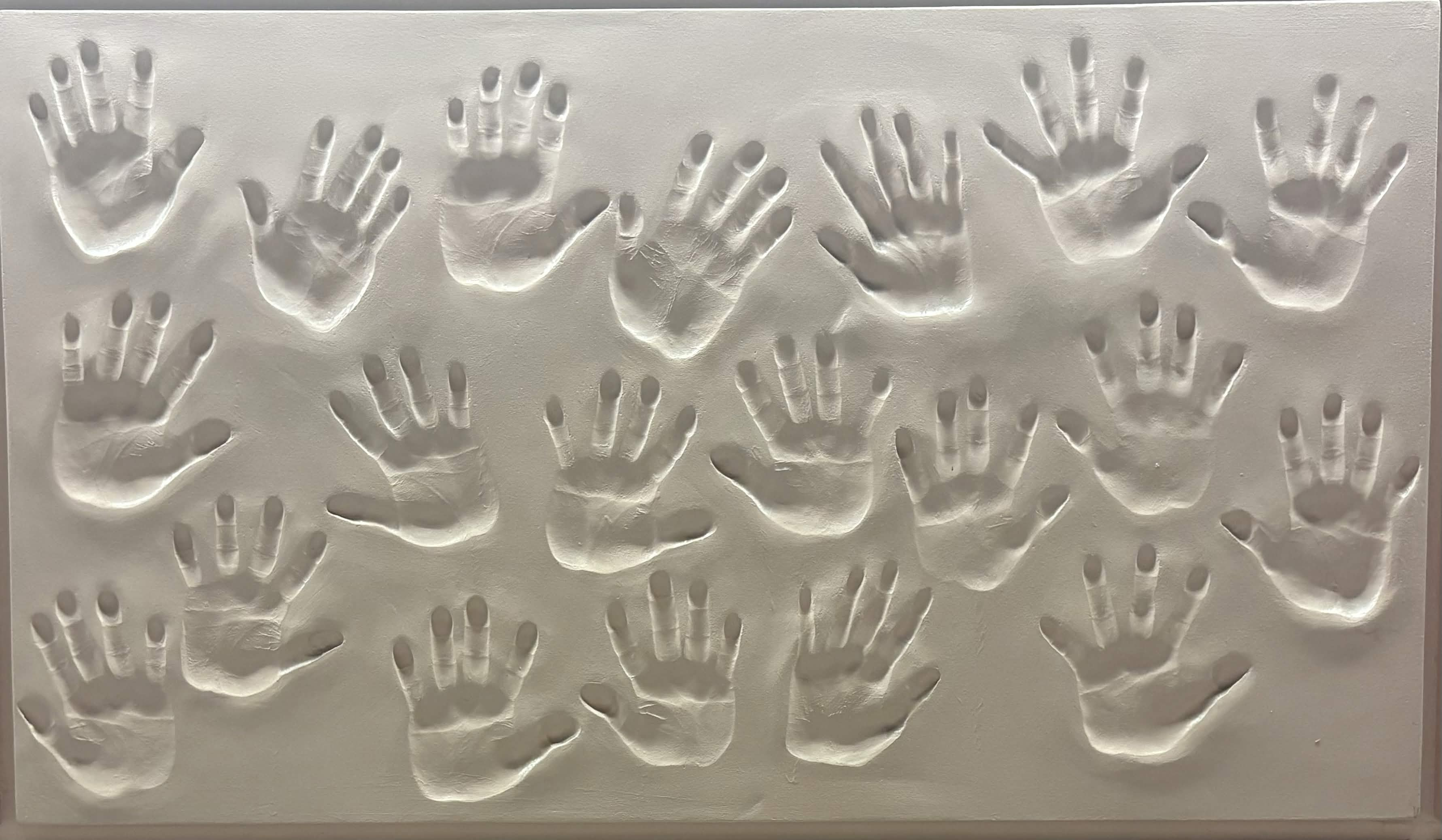
A panel of the Art in Transit artwork.

Hands Up For Hougang by Seck Yok Ying is displayed at this station as part of the Art in Transit programme. It consists of 3,000 handprints of diverse backgrounds, including Hougang residents, LTA management and contractors. The artist hoped to connect with people through this artwork. Having worked in the construction industry, Seok also wanted those behind the station's construction to be remembered and hence conceived this artwork so that they could leave their imprint on the work. Seok also designed the platform seats in various shapes, intended to establish a welcoming atmosphere for commuters.

The LTA invited 2500 residents for the project, which was conducted through twenty sessions in April 2001. Each hand was soaked in olive oil before imprinting into the clay. For entire families joining the project, their handprints were all collected on a shared slab. The collected prints were transformed into rubber moulds sourced from the National University of Singapore before being rendered on glass-reinforced cement that can be moulded into panels. These panels were then arranged together in cohesive rows of hands.
