= Tou Mu Kung Temple =

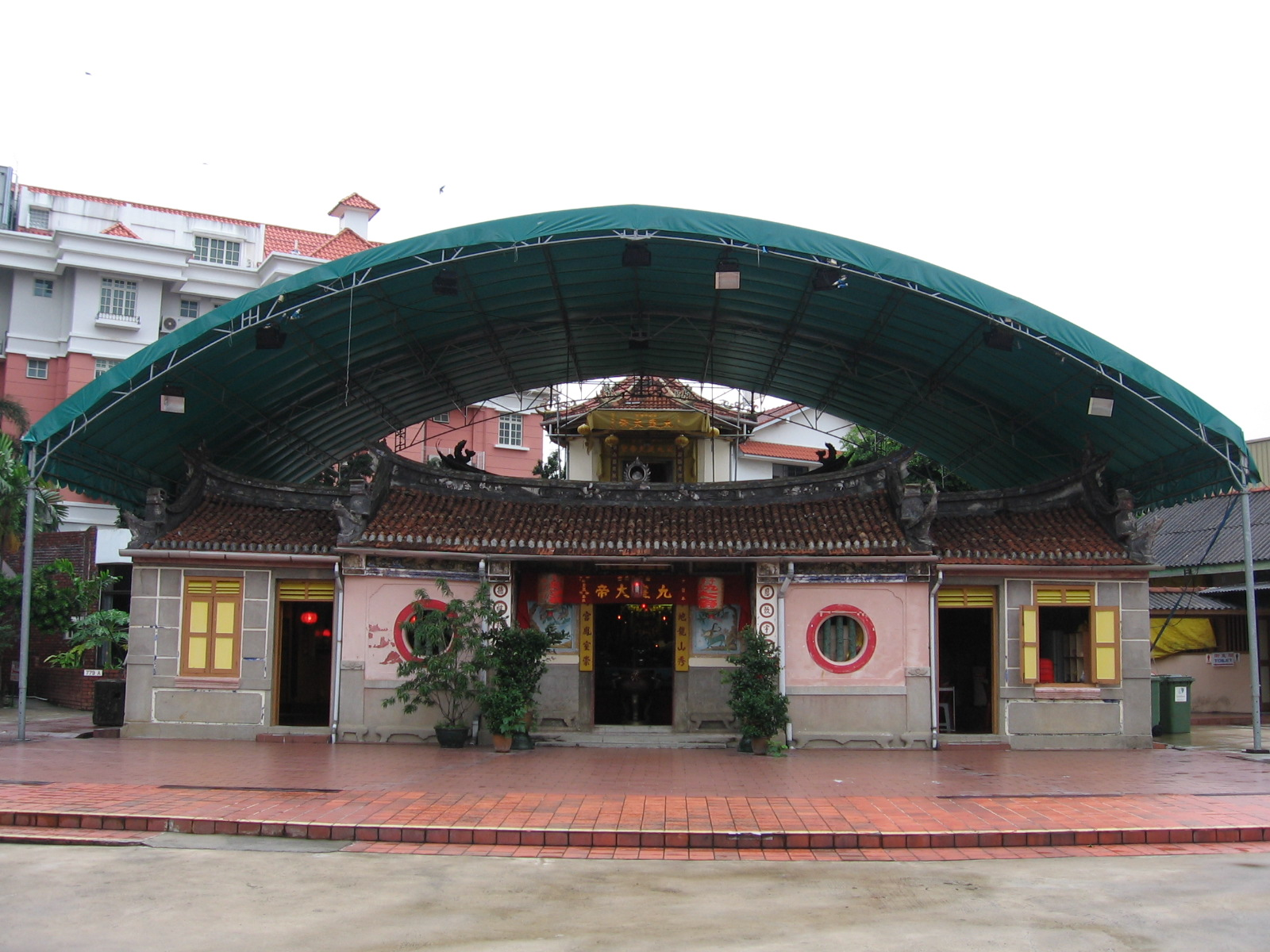
- Tou Mu Kung Temple in 2006

- Location within Singapore
- 1.3551°N 103.8788°E
- Location: 779A Upper Serangoon Road

History
- Built: 1881

Site notes
- Governing body: National Heritage Board

National monument of Singapore
- Designated: 14 January 2005; 21 years ago
- Reference no.: 54

The Tou Mu Kung Temple (斗母宮) is a Taoist temple situated on Upper Serangoon Road, Singapore. Worshipping the Empress Registrar of Birth or Doumu (斗母) and Nine Emperor Gods (九皇大帝), the temple has both Taoist and Buddhist influences.

There are other temples dedicated to Tou Mu (Dou Mu) in many parts of China (e.g. on Mount Tai).

== History ==
The temple started as a home shrine by Ong Choo Kee, a Chinese merchant. Ong had vowed to venerate the Nine Emperor Gods in exchange for successful business deals. He became successful and his home shrine became popular with an increase of worshippers. A Hokkien pineapple tycoon, Ong Chwee Tow (王水斗), donated a land parcel in Hougang to build a proper temple for worshippers.

The temple started construction in 1919 and completed in 1921. It caters to the Teochew community, and was one of two remaining temples in Singapore with a permanent Chinese opera stage until 1998. For eight decades, Chinese opera was performed there during religious and other festivals.

The temple was gazetted as a national monument, which was deemed to be of special historic and traditional value, on 14 January 2005.

== Architecture ==
The temple has a symmetrical floor plan with a central air-well. Behind the main hall is a two-story pagoda. Single-storey quarters for the keepers of the temple are located at the rear of the temple.

The roof of the temple is decorated with dancing dragons. There is also a ridge decoration in the main temple hall. The centre of the ridge has a blazing pearl. Dragons and dragon fish are used to terminate the ridges. Hips are terminated by spirals. The roof trusses are typically Chinese, decorated with carvings and simple brackets. The main doors are painted with pictures of the Door Gods. Its colour scheme of light blue and brown is rather subdued when compared to other temples.

The main altar is dedicated to the main deity (Nine Emperor). To the left of the main altar is an altar to Dou Mu (Tou Mu), and to the right, Guan Yin. An inscription on a wall plaque above the main entrance shows the names of benefactors and the date of construction of the temple.

== Sources ==
- "NTU team to study popular Taoist festival of the Nine Emperor Gods". The Straits Times (online). 1 October 2016.
