= Hougang =

Planning area and new town in North-East Region, Singapore

Hougang Aukang
- Planning Area and HDB Town

Others transcription(s)
  - Chinese: 后港 (Simplified) 後港 (Traditional); Hòugǎng (Pinyin) (pronounced [xôʊ.kàŋ]); Aū-káng (Hokkien POJ)
  - Malay: Hougang
  - Tamil: ஹவ்காங் Havkāṅ (Transliteration)
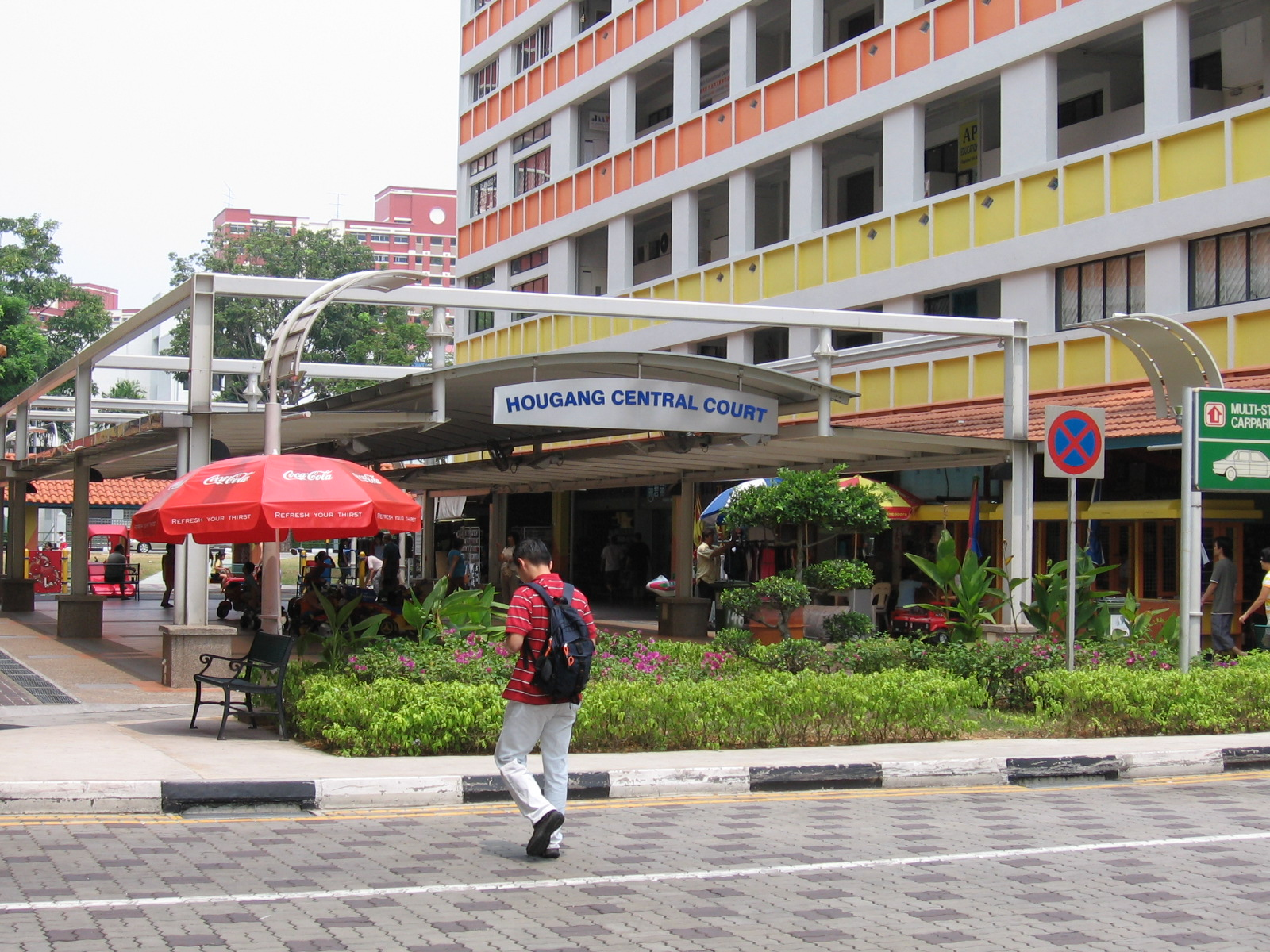
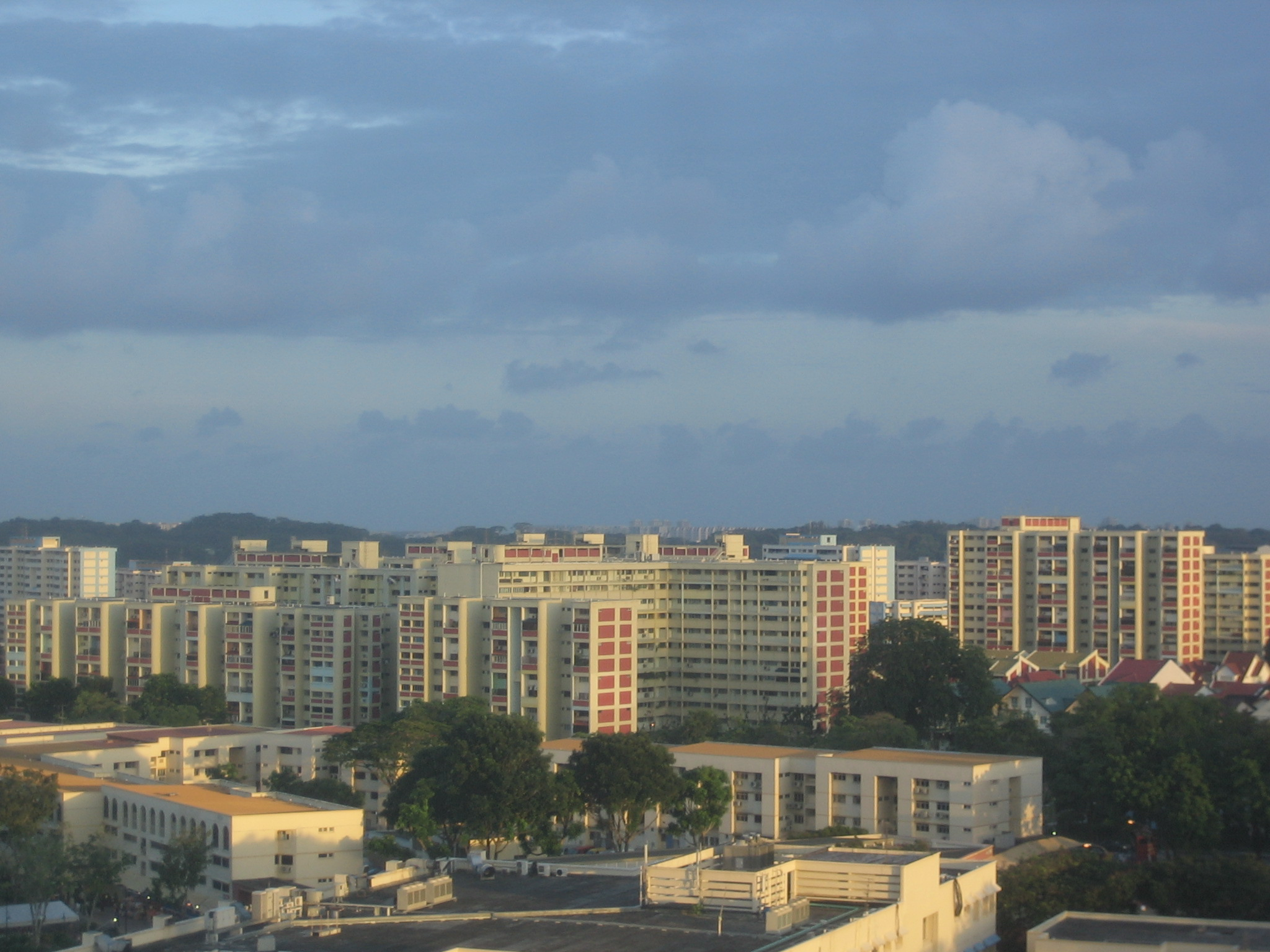
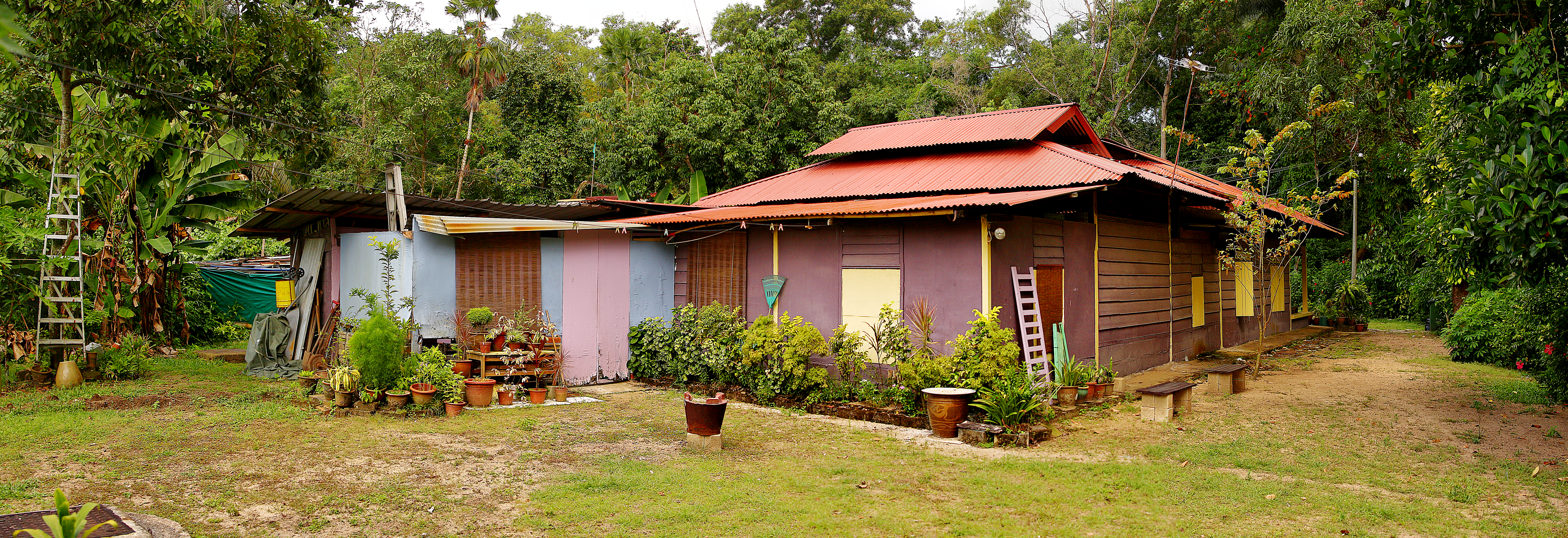
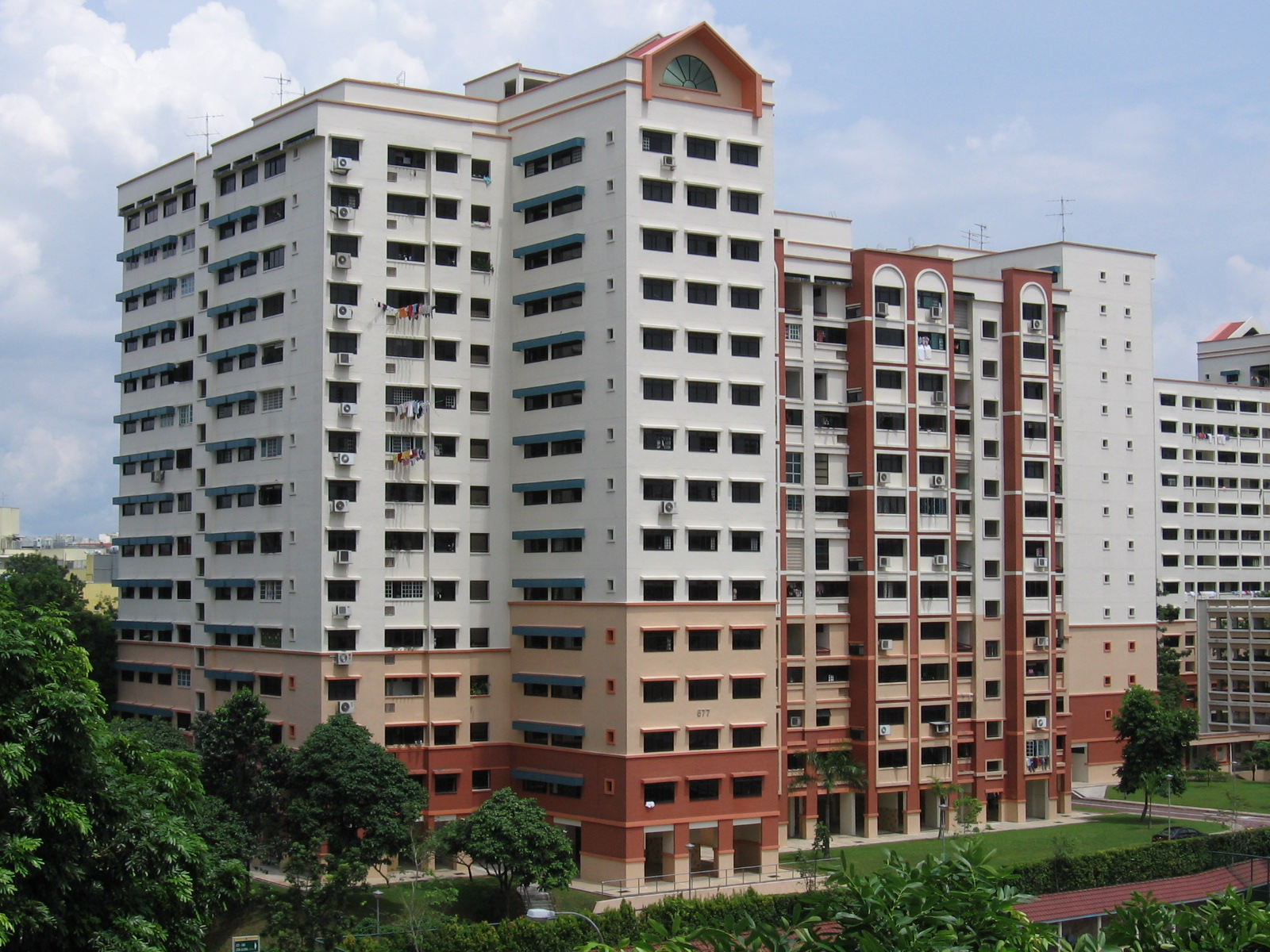
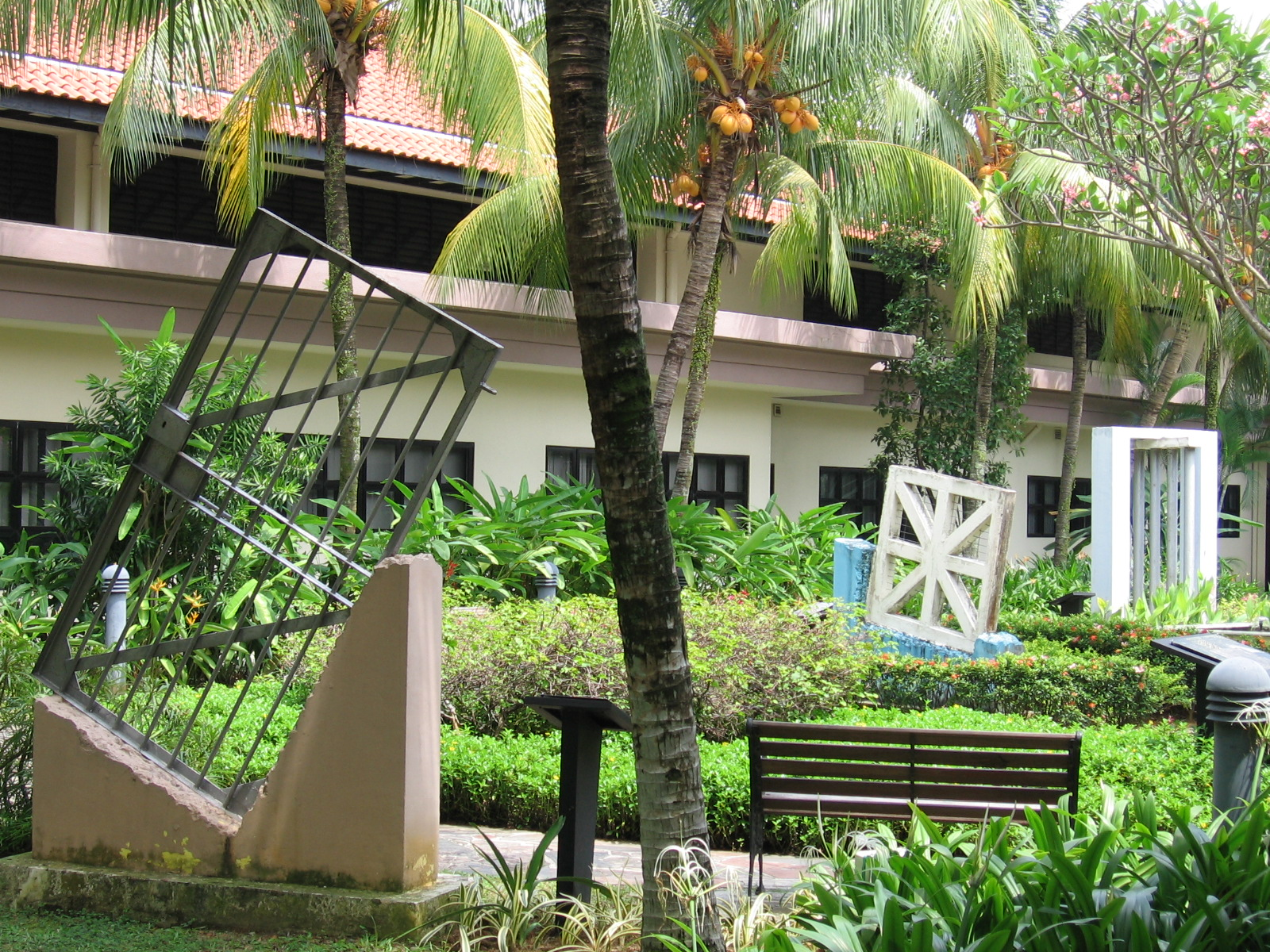
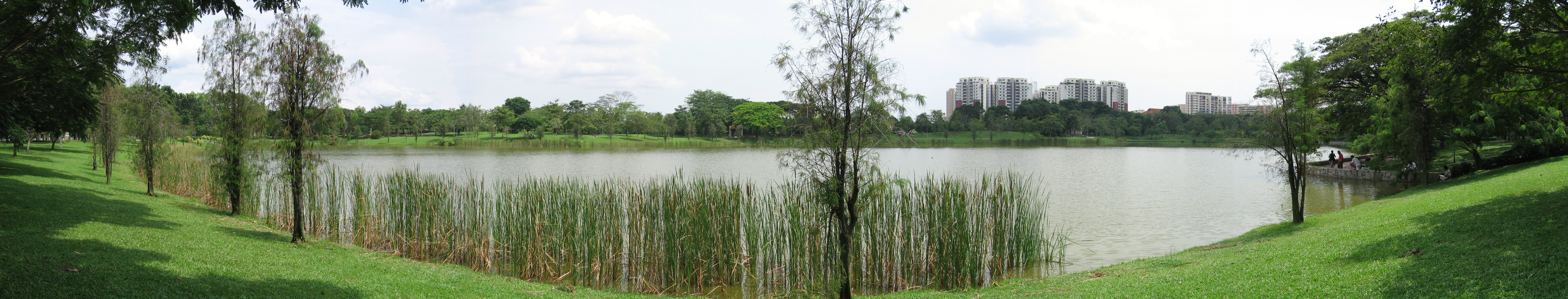
- From top left to right: Hougang Central, Aerial view of Kovan, Kampong Lorong Buangkok, Flats along Hougang Avenue 4, Heritage Garden of the Institute of Mental Health, Panoramic view of Punggol Park

- Location of Hougang in Singapore

- Location of Hougang within Singapore
- Coordinates: 01°22′17″N 103°53′33″E
- Country: Singapore
- Region: North-East Region
- CDCs: Central Singapore; South East
- Town Councils: Ang Mo Kio; Aljunied–Hougang; Marine Parade–Braddell Heights
- Constituencies: Aljunied GRC; Ang Mo Kio GRC; Hougang SMC; Marine Parade–Braddell Heights GRC

Government
  - Mayors: Central Singapore CDC: Denise Phua; South East CDC: Dinesh Vasu Dash
  - Members of Parliament: Aljunied GRC: Gerald Giam; Sylvia Lim; Kenneth Tiong; Ang Mo Kio GRC: Darryl David; Jasmin Lau; Victor Lye; Hougang SMC: Dennis Tan; Marine Parade–Braddell Heights GRC: Diana Pang

Area
  - Total: 13.93 km^{2} (5.38 sq mi)
  - Residential: 3.67 km^{2} (1.42 sq mi)

Population (2026)
  - Total: 226,100
  - Density: 16,230/km^{2} (42,040/sq mi)
- Postal district: 19
- Dwelling units: 51,646
- Projected ultimate: 72,000

Hougang (locally /ˌ(h)aʊˈkɑːŋ, -ʌŋ/ (h)ow-KUNG (Note: With an unaspirated [k], like the k in sky, in approximation of the Hokkien pronunciation of the district name.)), also known as Aukang, is a planning area and mature residential town located in the North-East Region of Singapore. It is the largest housing estate in Singapore based on land area, and is home to 226,100 residents as of 2026. Hougang planning area is bordered by Sengkang to the north, Geylang to the south, Bedok to the southeast, Toa Payoh to the southwest, Serangoon to the west and Paya Lebar to the east.

== Geography ==
Subzones

Hougang is separated into 10 subzones, Hougang East, Defu Industrial Park, Tai Seng, Lorong Halus, Kangkar, Hougang West, Trafalgar, Lorong Ah Soo, Kovan and Hougang Central.

== History and etymology ==
Hougang is situated upstream or at the back of Sungei Serangoon. Historically, the area just beyond the seventh milestone along Punggol Road was considered part of Punggol; however, it is now part of Hougang, and that specific stretch of Punggol Road has been renamed Hougang Avenue 8, with Punggol Road itself starting further north. The name "Hougang" originates from the Teochew term "Aukang," which refers to the river tributary behind Sungei Serangoon. While it was officially renamed using pinyin, specifically "后港" in Mandarin, following the Speak Mandarin Campaign (SMC), the name "Aukang" remains commonly used among the older generation or is used to convey a sense of nostalgia.

The Catholic history of the region began in the mid-1850s when Father Ambroise Maistre purchased land to establish a chapel and allocate parcels to Catholic settlers. This community was predominantly composed of Teochew migrants from Shantou, leading to the area being colloquially known as the "Teochew Kingdom." In 1901, the Neo-Gothic Church of the Nativity of the Blessed Virgin Mary was completed to serve the growing congregation, replacing an earlier attap chapel. The high concentration of Catholics and the numerous religious vocations originating from the area eventually earned it the moniker "the Holy Land." The church established schools such as Holy Innocents' High School and the St Francis Xavier Major Seminary, and it continues to celebrate Mass in Teochew today.

Before its urban transformation, pig farming was a major activity in Punggol, including the sectors that now comprise Hougang Town. These farmers were eventually relocated to Hougang's new flats by the late 1990s. The area also featured a fishing port at the end of Upper Serangoon Road, situated beyond the seventh milestone. Formal development of the town began in 1977 with the construction of Tampines Way, followed by the completion of Neighbourhoods 1 through 3 by 1983. Expansion continued through the late 20th century, with Neighbourhoods 4 through 7 finished by 1992, the town centre in Neighbourhood 8 completed in 1994, and finally Neighbourhood 9 in 2000.

In 2015, Hougang Capeview, a Build-To-Order (BTO) public housing project on Upper Serangoon Road, became the first public housing development to receive the CONQUAS Star from the Building and Construction Authority (BCA). Comprising 781 residential units across six blocks, the project earned a Construction Quality Assessment System (CONQUAS) score of over 95, significantly higher than the national average of 88.2.

== Shopping ==
Hougang has 8 shopping malls which are

- Hougang Mall, a seven-storey shopping mall with an NTUC FairPrice outlet, Singtel outlet, Starhub outlet, and Popular bookstore. The mall serves the residents of Hougang Central. It was opened in 1997.
- Hougang Green Shopping Mall, a four-storey shopping mall with a 24/7 Giant outlet. The mall serves Hougang West. Built and opened in 1998.
- Hougang Rivercourt - It is a shopping mall integrated as the HDB neighbourhood centre that was opened in May 2022 that are tenants with Sheng Siong, Burger King, and more.
- The Midtown, a mixed development with a condominium and a cluster of shops in Hougang Central.
- Hougang 1, a suburban mall with an NTUC FairPrice Xtra outlet in Hougang West. It was opened in 1999.
- Heartland Mall, a suburban mall across the road from Kovan, directly served by Kovan MRT Station. It has a Cold Storage outlet and Popular bookstore. It was originally opened in 1984 as the Oriental Emporium Mall and in 2001 was rebranded with its current name.
- Kang Kar Mall, a two-storey shopping centre which has a Kang Kar Food Court and a two-storey NTUC FairPrice outlet.
- Upper Serangoon Shopping Centre, a suburban mall that has a cluster of shops, it serves residents of Kovan.
- Buangkok Square Shopping Mall, a mixed development shopping mall in Buangkok with condominiums and a three-storey shopping mall with McDonald's, and a Prime Supermarket. It was opened in February 2019.

== Transport ==
=== Bus interchange ===
==== Hougang Central Bus Interchange ====
Hougang Central Bus Interchange is a bus interchange serving the town of Hougang. It is located directly above Hougang MRT station. By 2030, Hougang Central Bus Interchange will be modernised to accommodate the Cross Island Line section, in addition to becoming an Integrated Transport Hub.

=== Bus depots ===
==== Hougang Bus Depot ====
Hougang Bus Depot is an SBS Transit West District bus depot located in Hougang, Singapore. As of November 2014, the total fleet is 600 buses. Hougang Bus Depot started operations in 1983 when the north-east which is Hougang and Serangoon was developed and previously, all operations had been on Ang Mo Kio Bus Depot and Bedok Bus Depot respectively.

==== Kim Chuan Depot Extension ====
Kim Chuan Depot Extension is an upcoming bus depot located in Hougang, along Hougang Avenue 3, and is accessible via Hougang Close. Contract BC802 for Serangoon–Eunos bus package under the bus contracting model was awarded to SMRT Buses in 16 July 2026 which will commence operations in this depot extension from 13 June 2027.

==== Lorong Halus Bus Depot ====
Lorong Halus Bus Depot is an upcoming bus depot located in Hougang, along Tampines Road, and is accessible via Serangoon River Road. Construction began in 2025 and is scheduled to be completed by 2029 for Loyang bus package under the bus contracting model which will be the permanent replacement for Loyang Bus Depot.

=== Mass Rapid Transit stations ===
There are four main stations serving Hougang, as part of the Circle Line and North East Line. Hougang will be served by the Cross Island Line slated to be completed by 2030.

- NE13 Kovan
- NE14 CR8 Hougang (Note: Cross Island Land will only be operational in 2030)
- CC11 Tai Seng
- CR7 Defu

=== Mass Rapid Transit depots ===
==== Kim Chuan Depot ====
Kim Chuan Depot is a train depot for the Mass Rapid Transit system in Singapore. The depot is constructed fully underground and provides maintenance, stabling and operational facilities for the Circle Line. It is located in Hougang, along Upper Paya Lebar Road, and is accessible via Kim Chuan Road. It used to be the first depot in Singapore to serve two independently operated MRT lines, until the adjacent Tai Seng Facility Building became operational with the revenue operation of the Downtown Line Stage 3 on 21 October 2017.

==== Tai Seng Facility Building ====
Tai Seng Facility Building, abbreviated as TSFB, (or Tai Seng) is an underground train depot for the Mass Rapid Transit system in Singapore. The depot is constructed towards the east of Kim Chuan Depot and will provide maintenance, stabling and operational facilities for the Downtown Line. It is located in Hougang along Bartley Road East. It is accessible via a surface building located along Bartley Road East. The depot is approximately 52 metres wide, 295 metres long and 20 metres deep. It is connected to Kim Chuan Depot and has underground access for trains to run between both facilities, allowing Downtown Line trains to be stabled in the Tai Seng Facility Building, and able to access its remote tracks. It is used in tandem with Kim Chuan Depot for the operations of the Downtown Line.

=== Road networks ===
Two of the oldest main roads: Upper Serangoon Road and Punggol Road run through Hougang since the town's beginning. The town is also linked to other towns by Yio Chu Kang Road in the West, Tampines Road in the East, Upper Paya Lebar Road to the south-East, Buangkok Drive & Buangkok Green in the North.

Other roads in Hougang New Town links the town to bigger roads, most importantly Avenue 2, 3 which links the town from East and West.

== Amenities ==
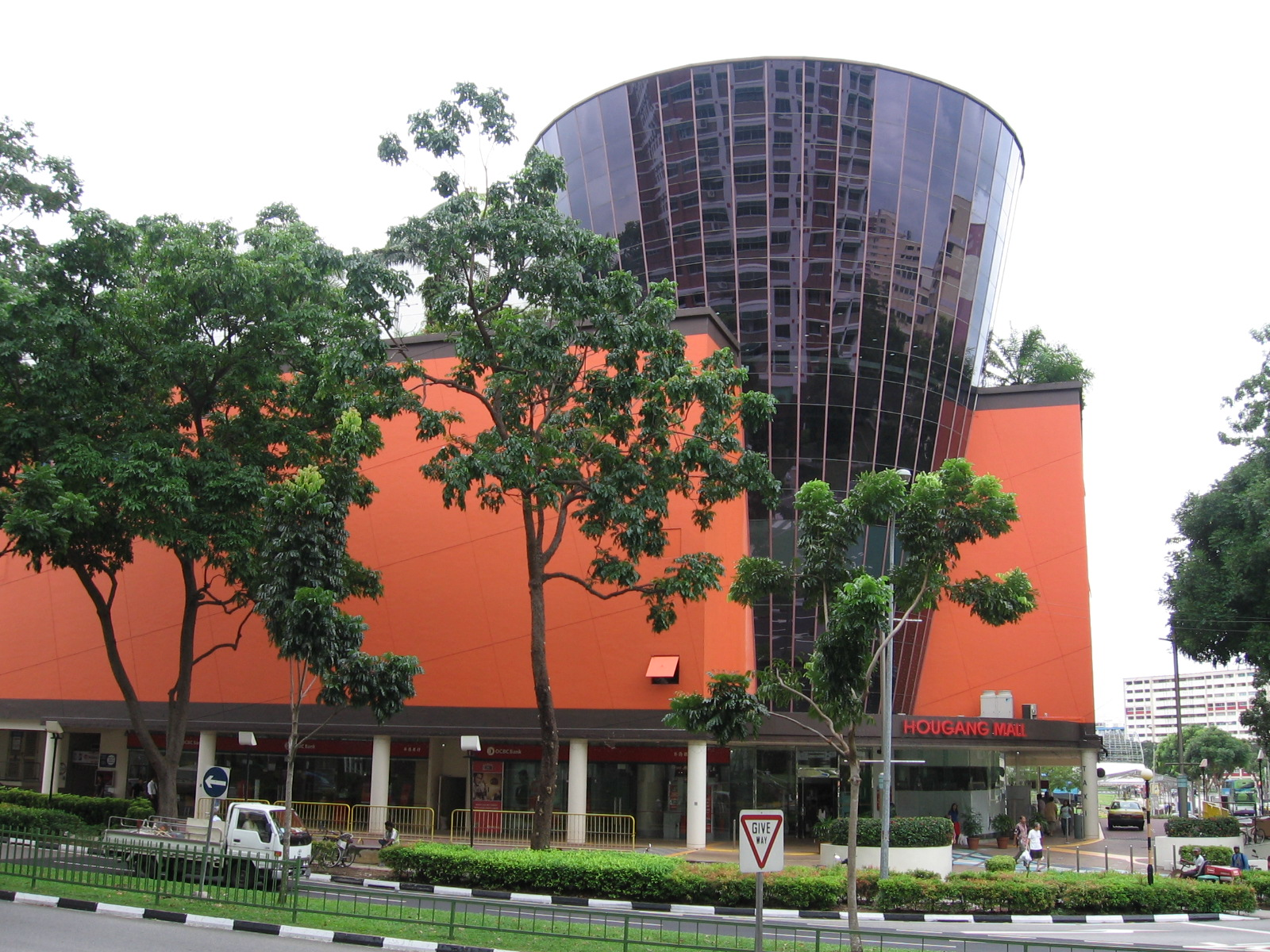
Hougang Mall Shopping Centre

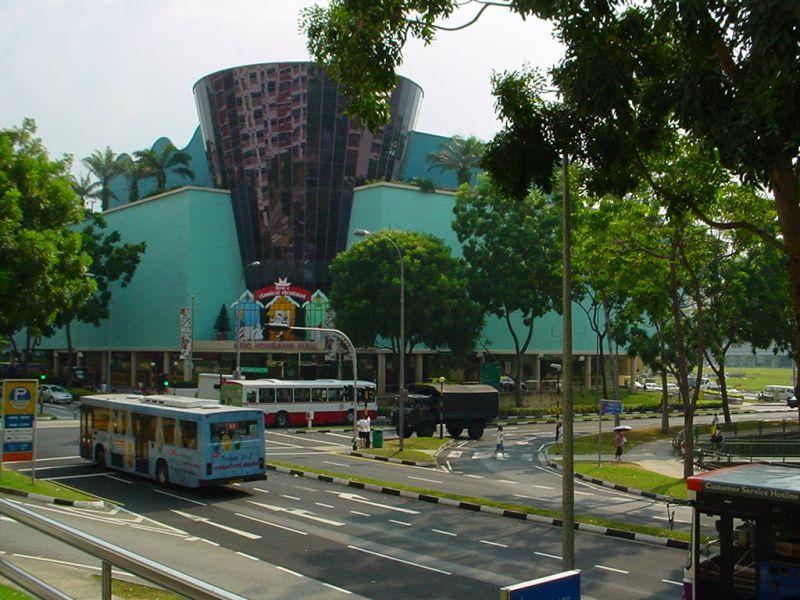
Another view of Hougang Mall Shopping Centre, before renovation

Most of Hougang's commercial activity is centred on a few shopping malls such as Hougang Mall, Kang Kar Mall, Heartland Mall, Upper Serangoon Shopping Centre, Hougang Rivercourt Shopping Centre (that opened in May 2022), and Hougang 1 (Formerly known as Hougang Point, and opened in End 1999).

Similar to most other residential towns in Singapore, Hougang was designed to be a partially self-sufficient with enough amenities to minimize the number of residents commuting to the Central Area. Facilities include Hougang Sports Hall, an indoor sports complex operated by Sport Singapore which runs ClubFITT membership and sports programmes, Hougang stadium home to S.League club Hougang United, an aquatics centre, a number of parks such as Punggol Park, along with many wet markets and hawker centres.

One of the more prominent landmarks in Hougang is the Buangkok Green Medical Park, which houses several medical facilities including the Institute of Mental Health (IMH) and Singapore Leprosy Relief Association (SILRA).

The Hougang Central Bus Interchange serves Hougang Town with a range of bus services going to other parts of the island. It is located in Hougang Central, near Hougang Mall and it has an underground link to Hougang MRT station. This bus interchange was officially opened on 17 December 1994 by former cabinet minister Goh Chee Wee, who was then Senior Minister of State for Communications, Trade and Industry to serve all buses around the Hougang Area. Its sister bus interchange, Hougang South Bus Interchange (that is near to Kovan MRT station) ceased operations in 2004 and was converted to Kovan Hub, now serving as a layover point for Bus 115 and termination point for some Privately operated bus services to Kuala Lumpur.

Two even older bus terminals operated in Hougang before the construction of the Hougang Central and Hougang South Bus Interchanges. One was at the end of Upper Serangoon Road in Kangkar Village, which was replaced by Hougang Central, while the other was at the sixth and a half milestone of Upper Serangoon Road, which was replaced by Hougang South.

== Highlights ==
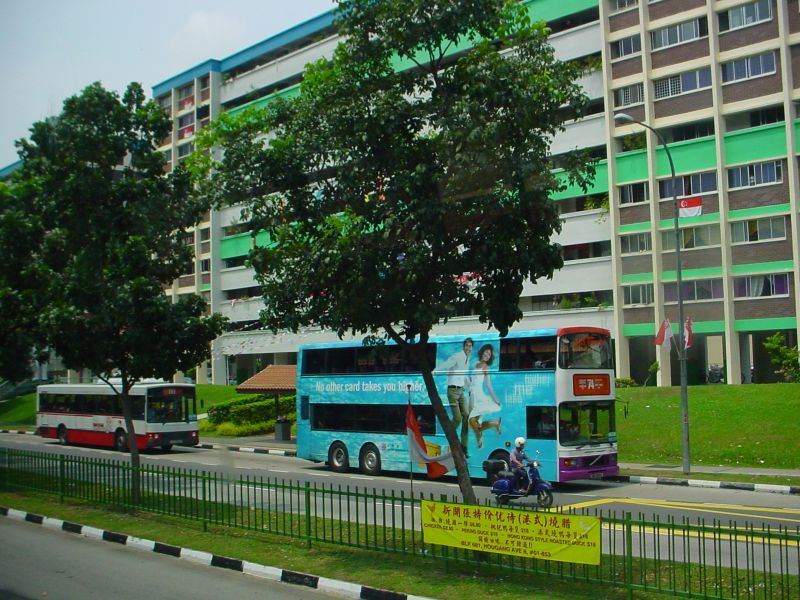
Houses in Hougang

A distinctive feature of Hougang lies in the large semi-circular balconies which occur in many Housing and Development Board public housing flats in the area. This feature is not as prevalent in public housing outside Hougang.

== Politics ==
Prior to the new town developments, most of Hougang was covered by Punggol Constituency until it was redistricted among other GRCs since 1991, with some areas fall under Serangoon and Paya Lebar instead. As of the 2025 elections, Hougang was under the administration for four different constituencies under eight different MPs: Avenues 2, 3, 5 and 7 covers the namesake Hougang SMC; Avenues 1, 6, 8, 10, and Street 21, a majority of Lorong Halus, and the sub-districts of Defu Industrial Park and Kovan covers Aljunied GRC; Avenues 4, 8 and 9, and Street 91, Hougang Stadium, Regentville Condo, and parts of Buangkok covers Ang Mo Kio GRC; and the Southern parts of Hougang and the sub-district of Tai Seng covers Marine Parade-Braddell Heights GRC.

Most of Hougang have been challenged by the Workers' Party over the years, with the party winning their party's safe seats of Hougang SMC (since 1991) and Aljunied GRC (since 2011), both with Low Thia Khiang leading them during his political career until his retirement in 2020. WP also had contested Ang Mo Kio GRC in the 2006 election, and Marine Parade GRC (now Marine Parade-Braddell Heights GRC) in 2015 and 2020, though the other two constituencies were still won by the ruling People's Action Party despite margins under the national average in most of the contests, or via a walkover (such as Aljunied GRC in 2001 and Marine Parade-Braddell Heights GRC in 2025).

== Education ==
Hougang has a total of nine primary schools, eight secondary schools and a single international school as of 2024.

=== Primary schools ===
- CHIJ Our Lady of the Nativity
- Holy Innocents' Primary School
- Hougang Primary School
- Montfort Junior School
- Paya Lebar Methodist Girls' School (Primary)
- Punggol Primary School
- Xinghua Primary School
- Xinmin Primary School
- Yio Chu Kang Primary School

=== Secondary schools ===
- Bowen Secondary School
- Holy Innocents' High School
- Hougang Secondary School
- Montfort Secondary School
- Paya Lebar Methodist Girls' School (Secondary)
- Serangoon Secondary School
- Xinmin Secondary School
- Yuying Secondary School

=== Other schools ===
- DIMENSIONS International College (Kovan Campus)

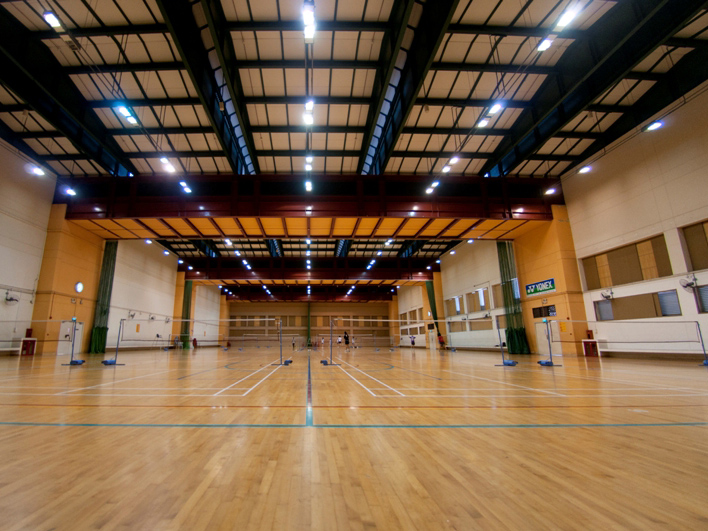
Hougang Sports Hall

== See also ==
- Hougang Tou Mu Kung Temple
- List of Kangchu system placename etymologies

== Sources ==
- Victor R Savage, Brenda S A Yeoh (2003), Toponymics – A Study of Singapore Street Names, Eastern Universities Press, ISBN 981-210-205-1
- The Florence Residences
