= Yuying Secondary School =

Government school in Hougang, Singapore

Yuying Secondary 育英中学 Yùyīng Zhōngxué

Location
- 47 Hougang Avenue 1, Singapore 538884
- Coordinates: 1.35675°N 103.88787°E

Information
- Type: Government Aided ( Hougang )
- Established: 15 March 1910; 115 years ago
- Session: Single
- School code: 7027
- Principal: Chong Jack Sheng
- Enrolment: 1220
- Colour: White
- Website: Yuying Secondary Website

Yuying Secondary (Chinese: 育英中学) was founded by the Hainanese Community in 1910 as a Chinese medium high school. Today, it follows the mainstream public education system and offers the Singapore-Cambridge GCE ‘O’ and ‘N’ Levels. It also uses a full English curriculum, except for foreign or mother tongue languages.

Initially, it was known as Yock Eng School (Chinese: 育英学校). In 1947, it was renamed to Yock Eng High School (Chinese: 育英中校). Finally, in 1985, its name is changed to Yuying Secondary (Chinese: 育英中学). It was previously located at the present CDAC premises and moved to the current site at Hougang in 1986.

== History ==
=== 1910–1940 ===
On 15 March 1910, Yock Eng School, a Chinese primary school, was founded by 7 Hainanese community leaders. At that time, it was located at Prinsep Street (Chinese: 六马路) The school began with an enrolment of 15 pupils. However, it soon outgrew her premises as enrolment continued to climb. In 1939, the School Management Board initiated a campaign to raise funds for new premises.

=== 1941–1985 ===
In 1941, the school moved to a new campus at 65 Tanjong Katong Road. The two-storey building was given conservation status by Urban Redevelopment Authority on 8 April 2005.

The school programme was disrupted by the outbreak of World War II. During the War, the school premises were occupied by the Japanese armed forces and was used as Japanese Military Police HQ. The school reopened her doors to pupils in July 1946 with an enrolment of 600. The post-war years were a period of rapid growth for the school in terms of enrolment and recognition. In 1958, enrolment stood at a peak of 2400 pupils.

In 1954, some students were involved in the Malayan Emergency.

During the 1960s and 70s, there was a shift towards English medium education vis a vis Chinese medium education. Thus, the school admitted its first batch of English stream pupils in 1981. In 1988, the last batch of Chinese stream pupils graduated.

The government planned to acquire the land on which the school stood at Tanjong Katong Road. To relocate the school, the new school building was being in Hougang New Town at the cost of approximately $10 million. The government would share 50% of the cost. In 1984, the board of management of Yock Eng High School faced the dilemma of raising the remaining $5 million. If it could not raise sufficient funds, the board would have to turn over the management of the school to the Education Ministry and the school would be converted to a government school.

=== 1985–present ===
On 9 December 1985, the school was relocated to her present premises at 47 Hougang Avenue 1. The school was renamed Yuying Secondary School and was officially opened on 13 August 1987.

Today, Yuying continues as a Government-Aided secondary school. It is a single session school with an enrolment of 1290 pupils and 90 teachers.

The school also serves the surrounding Hougang community as a CDAC Tuition Centre in the evenings and on Saturdays. Several teachers are serving in this centre.

== Notable alumni ==
- Han Sai Por - sculptor
- Aloysius Pang - actor

== Co-curricular activities ==
=== Basketball ===
In 1974, Yock Eng High School won the National Schools Secondary basketball title at Gay World Stadium by beating Anglican High School 90-80.

=== Concert band ===
On 24 January 2012, Brass bands from East Spring Secondary School and Yuying Secondary School had the honour to perform at the Open House of Istana. A performer from Yuying Secondary School, dressed as a big head doll, was also the centre of attention for a group of visitors.
