= Hougang Central Bus Interchange =

Bus interchange in Singapore

Hougang Central Bus Interchange 后港中心巴士转换站 Pusat Pertukaran Bas Hougang Central
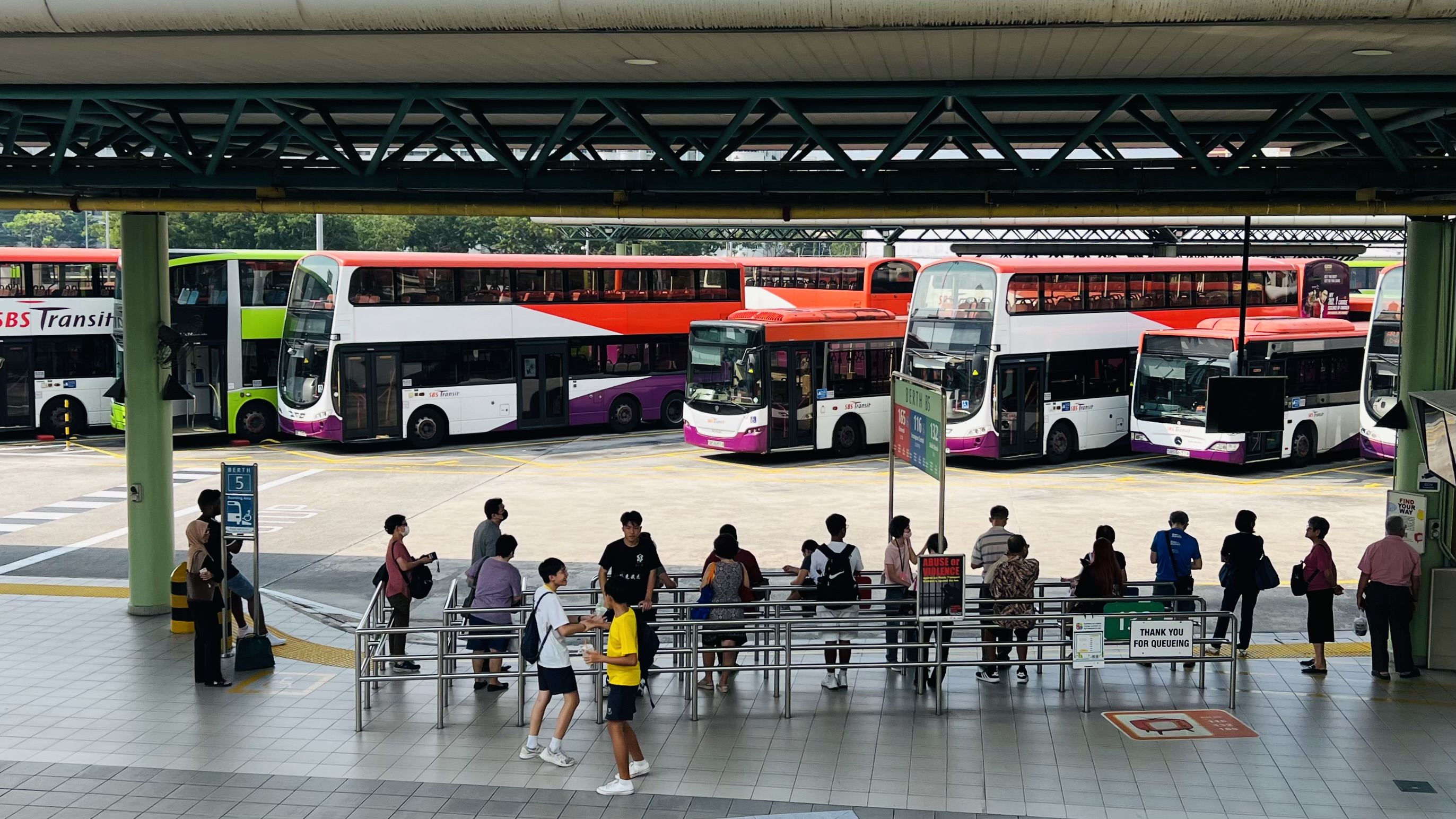
- Hougang Central Bus Interchange.

General information
- Location: 840 Hougang Central, Singapore 538757
- Coordinates: 1°22′15.7″N 103°53′35.2″E
- System: Public Bus Interchange
- Owner: Land Transport Authority
- Operator: SBS Transit
- Bus routes: 20 (SBS Transit)
- Bus stands: 4 linear alighting berth 6 sawtooth boarding berths
- Bus operators: SBS Transit
- Connections: NE14 CR8 Hougang

Construction
- Structure type: At-grade
- Accessible: Accessible alighting/boarding points Accessible public toilets Graduated kerb edges Tactile guidance system

History
- Opened: 17 December 1994; 31 years ago

Key dates
- 17 December 1994: Commenced operations
Location

Hougang Central Bus Interchange is a bus interchange serving the town of Hougang. It is located directly above Hougang MRT station.

== History ==
Plans to build a bus interchange in Hougang North were first announced in Parliament in January 1992. Intended to connect Hougang with adjacent new towns and the Central Area, the bus interchange was built in response to requests made by the Member of Parliament for the area to improve bus services. The new Hougang Central Bus Interchange was opened by Minister of State (Trade and Industry and Communications) Goh Chee Wee on 17 December 1994. It had cost S$5.7 million.

From 1998 to 2001, Hougang Central Bus Interchange was closed to facilitate the construction of Hougang MRT station, and six bus services were diverted to a temporary bus interchange along Upper Serangoon Road. In February 2004, it began to manage former bus operations at Hougang South Bus Interchange.

In 2015, the interchange was expanded by 0.3 hectares (0.74 acres), to provide additional bus parking space for more bus services.

== Redevelopment ==
In 2012, the Ministry of Transport unveiled plans with an expected deadline of 2022 to rebuild Hougang Central Bus Interchange, which would make it part of an Integrated Transport Hub (ITH) with Hougang MRT station.

In 2024, it was announced that a new mixed-use development with a bus interchange would be built on the site bounded by Hougang Avenue 10 and Hougang Central, as part of the plans to develop the upcoming Hougang ITH. In December 2025, the bid for the mixed-use development was awarded to CapitaLand for S$1.5 billion. Construction of the development is expected to be completed in 2032.

== Bus contracting model ==
Under the bus contracting model, all bus services operating from Hougang Central Bus Interchange were divided into two bus packages, operated by the anchor operator, SBS Transit Ltd.

=== List of bus services ===
Operator	Package	Routes
SBS Transit	Clementi	74, 147, 147A
SBS Transit	Sengkang-Hougang	27, 51, 89, 89e, 102, 107, 107M, 112, 112A, 112B, 113, 116, 132, 151, 153, 161, 165, 324, 325, 329
