= Cheng San =

- Subzone of Ang Mo Kio Planning Area

Name transcription(s)
  - Chinese: 青山
  - Hokkien POJ: Chheⁿ-san
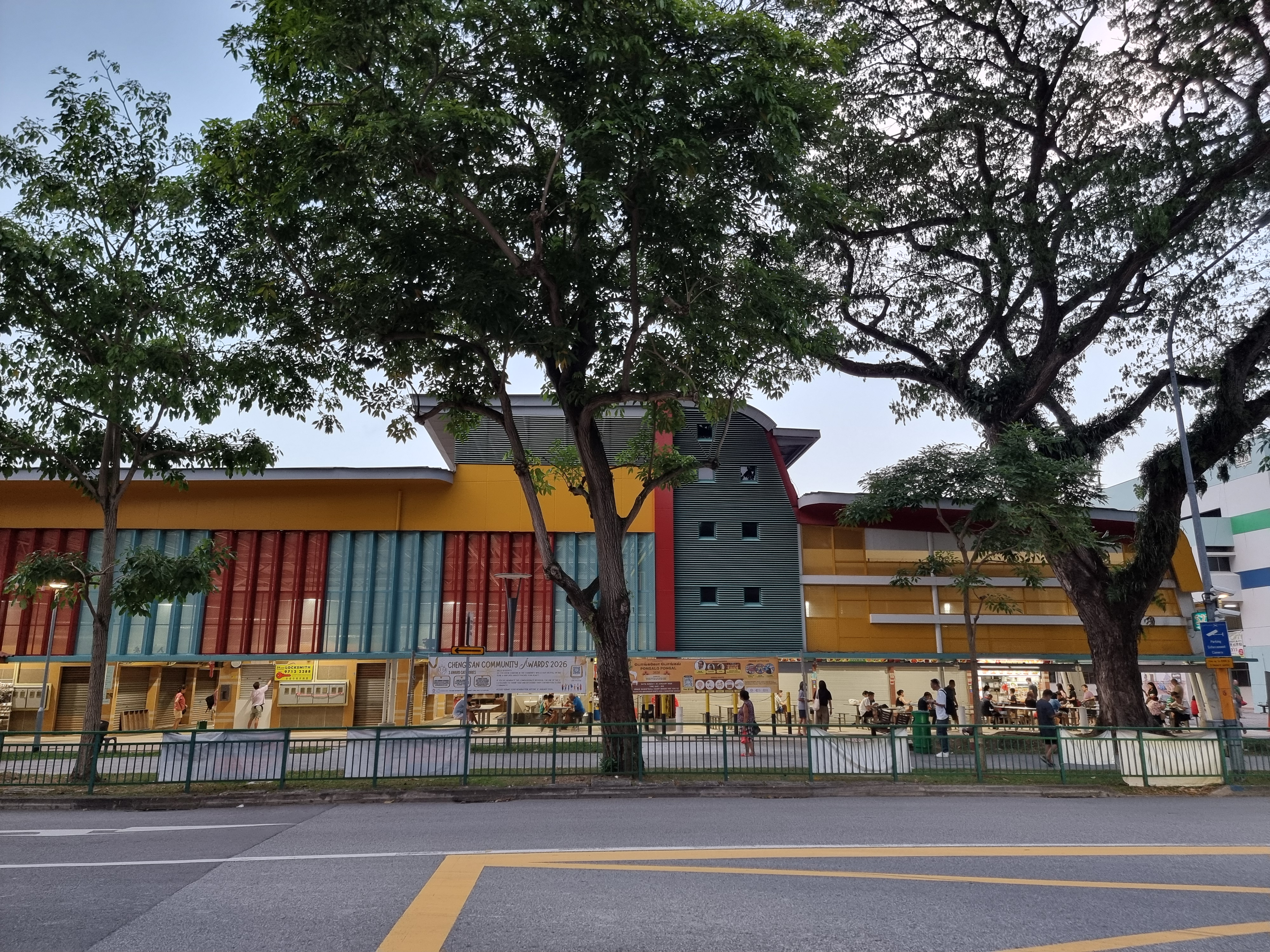
- Cheng San Market and Cooked Food Centre
- Interactive map of Cheng San
- Country: Singapore

Area
  - Total: 0.96 km^{2} (0.37 sq mi)

Population (2026)
  - Total: 26,100
  - Density: 27,000/km^{2} (70,000/sq mi)

Cheng San is a precinct located at Ang Mo Kio, Singapore. It has precincts of Neighbourhood 5. The nearest MRT stations are Ang Mo Kio and Yio Chu Kang.

== Etymology ==
The term Cheng San (Chinese: 青山; Pe̍h-ōe-jī: Chheⁿ-san) means green hills in Hokkien.

== Politics ==
Cheng San existed as a namesake SMC in the 1980 election which was first represented by minister Lee Yock Suan. Cheng San was upgraded into a GRC in 1988 before being dissolved into Ang Mo Kio Group Representation Constituency in 2001, coinciding Lee's departure from Cheng San. The present day MP is Nadia Ahmad Samdin as of the 2020 election.
