= Ang Mo Kio Town Garden East =

Park in Singapore

Ang Mo Kio Town Garden East is a community park in Ang Mo Kio, Singapore. It is situated at the junction of Ang Mo Kio Avenues 3 and 8, behind Ang Mo Kio MRT station. The park has been designated with the code 9V-0002 by the international Parks On The Air award program, and so is regularly 'activated' by Amateur Radio operators using portable equipment.

== History ==
Ang Mo Kio Town Garden East was first mentioned in an enquiry on the New Nation, where an interested applicant asked where "the 110 acre garden would be". It later appeared in a notice by the Housing and Development Board (HDB) in September 1979 in The Straits Times, who was looking for tenders to construct earthworks and carparks for the park. By October of the same year, they were still looking for a tender.

By October 1981, it was noted to have a spacenet, which was according to The Straits Times "the only of its kind in Singapore so far". In January 1983, a letter was published on The Straits Times, which criticised the garden for being "an eyesore" even though it was planned to be.

== Details ==
Ang Mo Kio Town Garden East is situated at the junction of Ang Mo Kio Avenues 3 and 8, behind Ang Mo Kio MRT station.

== See also ==
- Ang Mo Kio Town Garden West
- List of parks in Singapore
