= Masjid Al-Muttaqin =

Mosque located in Ang Mo Kio, Singapore

Masjid Al-Muttaqin مسجد المتقين
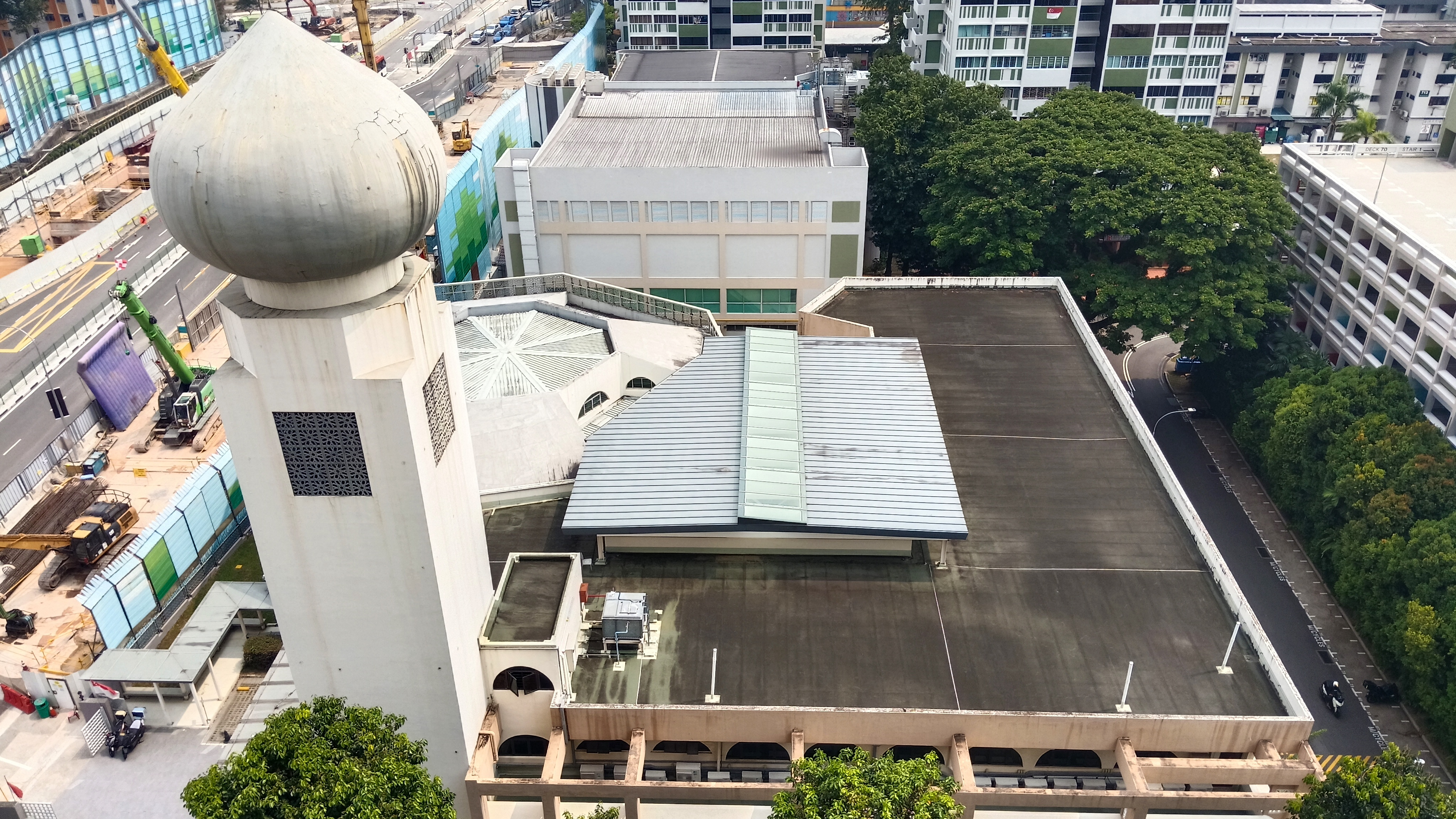
- Masjid Al-Muttaqin in 2026.

- Location in Singapore

Religion
- Affiliation: Sunni Islam

Location
- Location: 5140 Ang Mo Kio Avenue 6, Singapore 569844
- Country: Singapore
- Coordinates: 1.3705763°N 103.8461460°E

Architecture
- Type: Mosque
- Style: Modernist architecture
- Established: 1979
- Completed: 1980

Specifications
- Minaret: 1
- Minaret height: 2.8 m

Masjid Al-Muttaqin (Jawi: مسجد المتقين, Bengali: মসজিদ আল-মুত্তাকিন) is a congregational mosque located in Ang Mo Kio, Singapore. The mosque was built in 1980 and is situated along Ang Mo Kio Avenue 6, serving congregants in the neighborhood. Like other mosques in the country, it is under the management of the Majlis Ugama Islam Singapura (MUIS) and hosts the Friday prayer along with festive prayers during the Islamic festivals of Eid.

== Etymology ==
The name of the mosque, Al-Muttaqin, is an Arabic word that refers to people of high piety that are aware of the presence of God around them. In a literal sense, the Muttaqin are people who practice taqwa.

== History ==
The committee for the construction of a mosque to serve the Ang Mo Kio neighbourhood had been formed as early as late 1978, hosting sales around the neighborhood to fund the ongoing project. The name of the mosque was eventually chosen to be Masjid Al-Muttaqin in early 1979 and a model of the mosque was showcased on 2 April of that year. Then on 29 April 1979, the groundbreaking ceremony for Masjid Al-Muttaqin was performed by Syed Ali Redha Alsagoff, a chairman of a local student organization, Lembaga Biasiswa Kenangan Maulud. A spot at the junction of Ang Mo Kio Avenue 6 and Ang Mo Kio Avenue 3 was chosen for the construction of the proposed mosque. The project was then placed under the second phase of the Mosque Building Fund, an initiative by the Majlis Ugama Islam Singapura (MUIS) to fund the establishment of mosques throughout the country.

Construction on Masjid Al-Muttaqin had been completed by 18 August 1980, with a total cost of $1.9 million. A Kuwaiti politician, Yousef Jassem Al-Hajji, was given an early preview on 19 September of the same year, accompanied by Syed Isa Semait and other representatives of the MUIS. The mosque was ultimately opened on 21 September 1980 by Haji Rahmat Kenap, the Member-of-Parliament of Geylang Serai. It was also given the status of congregational mosque by the MUIS, allowing it to carry out the Friday prayers as well as Eid prayers.

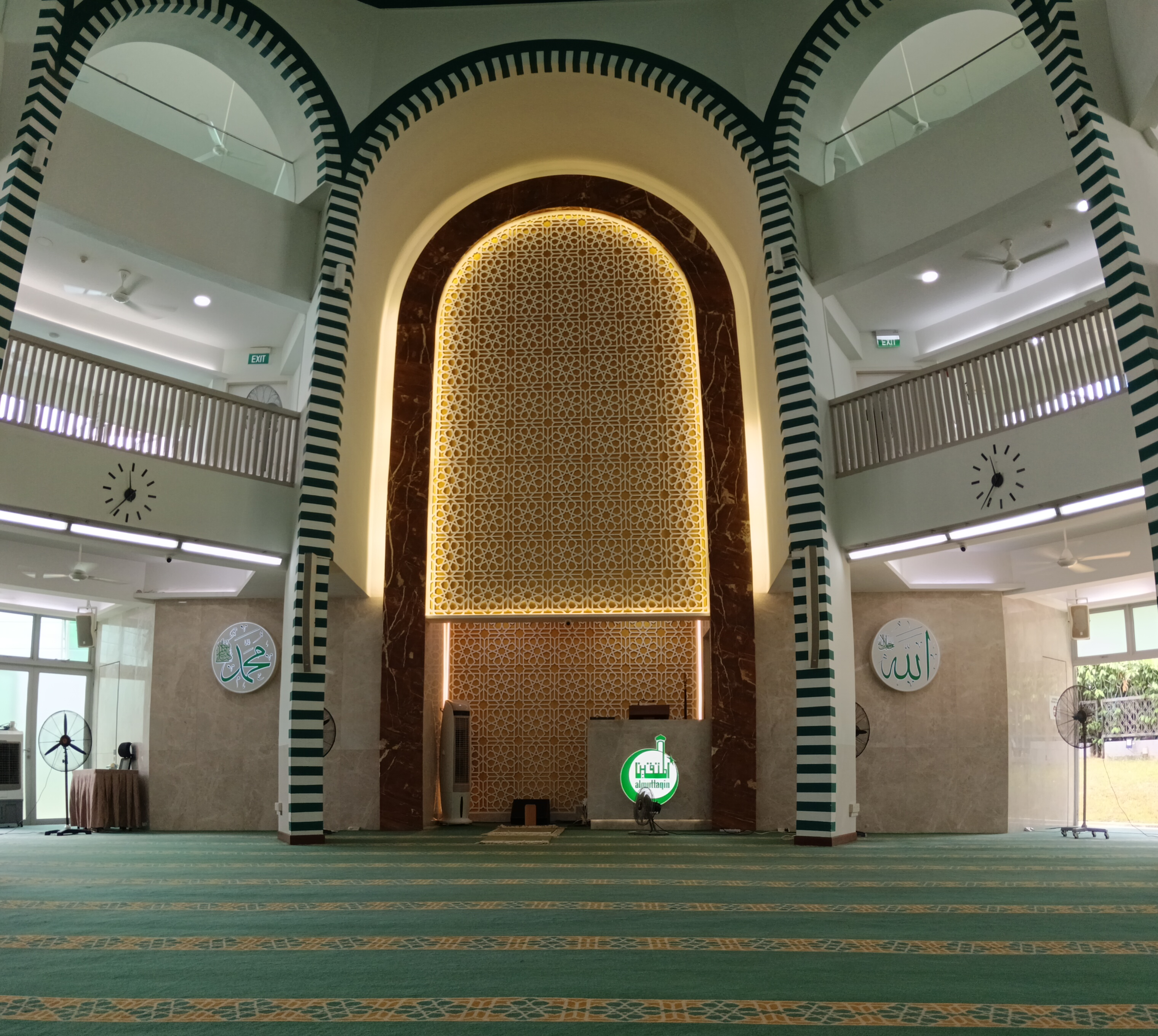
A panoramic view of the interior of the mosque.

In 1998, the mosque was renovated at the cost of $2.5 million, adding a new third level to the mosque as well as a private computer centre. Another extensive renovation took place in 2017, reshelling the exterior of the mosque and giving it a more modernist appearance while also increasing its capacity to three thousand and five hundred worshippers for better accommodation during the Friday prayer and Eid festivities. The mosque was also designated as being part of a waqf by the MUIS, which granted it a status as an inalienable endowment and also meant that further renovations would require permission from either the MUIS or the Housing and Development Board.

== Transportation ==
Masjid Al-Muttaqin is either accessible from the Ang Mo Kio MRT station on the North–South Line, or from its own dedicated bus stops along either side of Ang Mo Kio Avenue 6.

== See also ==
- Islam in Singapore
- List of mosques in Singapore
