= Kebun Baru =

- Subzone of Ang Mo Kio Planning Area

Name transcription(s)
  - Chinese: 哥本峇魯
  - Hokkien POJ: Ko-pún Bâ-ló͘
  - Malay: Kebun Baru
  - Tamil: கெபுன் பாரு
- Interactive map of Kebun Baru
- Coordinates: 1°22′24″N 103°50′14″E
- Country: Singapore
- Planning area: Ang Mo Kio Planning Area

Area
  - Total: 1.05 km^{2} (0.41 sq mi)

Population (2026)
  - Total: 21,430
  - Density: 20,400/km^{2} (52,900/sq mi)

Kebun Baru (Note: IPA: /ˈkəboʊn ˌbɑːruː, ˈkəbʊn -/ kə-bohn BAH-roo or kə-buun BAH-roo) is a precinct within Ang Mo Kio, Singapore. It is bounded in the West of Ang Mo Kio and bounded by Mayflower district and Bishan - Ang Mo Kio Park

== Etymology ==
Kebun Baru (new garden in Malay) is often seen as a tranquil district with a town park and consists of both public housing and private housing. The name is adapted from a former Kampong Kebun Baharu.

== Demographics ==
As of 2026, Kebun Baru has a total population of 21,430 residents, with 9,900 males (46.2%) and 11,530 females (53.8%).

As of 2026, Kebun Baru had 18,340 residents living in HDB flats (85.6%), 1,780 residents (8.3%) in condominiums and other apartments while 1,110 residents (5.2%) are staying in landed properties.

== Transportation ==
=== Roads ===
The main roads in the precinct are Upper Thomson Road, Yio Chu Kang Road and Ang Mo Kio Avenue 1 which connect the precinct to the Central Expressway with major roads (Ang Mo Kio Avenue 5, Ang Mo Kio Avenue 4) winding through the precinct.

=== Mass Rapid Transit ===
There is one Mass Rapid Transit station that serves the subzone across the Thomson–East Coast line:

- TE6 Mayflower

== For the community ==
=== Hawker Centre ===
There is one hawker centre and market in the precinct: Mayflower Market and Food Centre along Ang Mo Kio Avenue 4

=== Community Centre ===
The precinct's community centre (Kebun Baru Community Club) or colloquially known as Kebun Baru CC, is located along Ang Mo Kio Avenue 4, and is accessible by bus routes 71, 76, 268. 268A, 268B, 269 and 652 as well as Mayflower MRT station.

=== Schools ===
There is one primary school (CHIJ Saint Nicholas Girls' School (Primary)) and one secondary school (CHIJ Saint Nicholas Girls' School (Secondary)) in Kebun Baru.

=== Politics ===
Kebun Baru has its eponymous SMC where its Member of Parliament (MP) for this precinct is Henry Kwek. Between 1988 and 2020, Kebun Baru was subsumed inside Group representation constituency, with the most of Kebun Baru being under purview of the neighbouring Ang Mo Kio GRC, where Kebun Baru subtown was shared by both the division and Teck Ghee, whose MP is the third Prime Minister of Singapore Lee Hsien Loong, with exception being 2015 where Kebun Baru was subsumed into the neighbouring Nee Soon GRC instead.

=== Other amenities and landmarks ===
- Ang Mo Kio Town Garden West
- Bishan - Ang Mo Kio Park
- Kebun Baru Birdsinging Club
- Kebun Baru Neighbourhood Police Post
