= Mayflower MRT station =

Mass Rapid Transit station in Singapore

Mayflower TE6 美华 மேஃபிளவர்
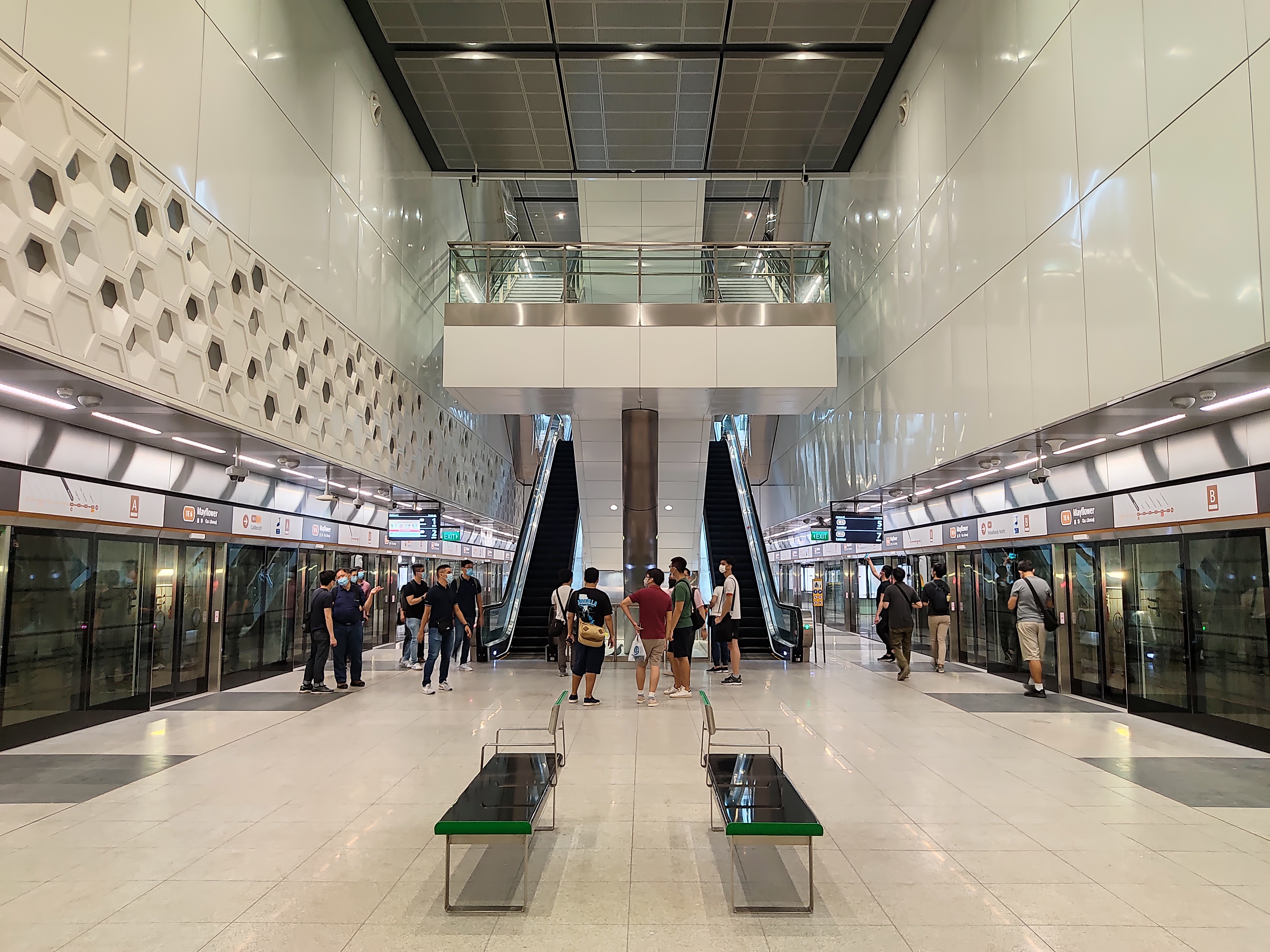
- Platform view of the station

General information
- Location: 91 Ang Mo Kio Avenue 4, Singapore 569900
- Coordinates: 01°22′21″N 103°50′14″E
- System: Mass Rapid Transit (MRT) station
- Owner: Land Transport Authority
- Operator: SMRT Trains
- Line: Thomson–East Coast Line
- Platforms: 2 (1 island platform)
- Tracks: 2
- Connections: Bus, Taxi

Construction
- Structure type: Underground
- Platform levels: 1
- Accessible: Yes

Other information
- Station code: MFL

History
- Opened: 28 August 2021; 5 years ago
- Former names: Kebun Baru, Ang Mo Kio West

Passengers
- June 2024: 9,368 per day

Services
Preceding station	Mass Rapid Transit	Following station
Lentor towards Woodlands North	Thomson–East Coast Line	Bright Hill towards Bayshore
Track layout
Location
- Location within Singapore Rail

Mayflower MRT station is an underground Mass Rapid Transit (MRT) station on the Thomson–East Coast Line (TEL) in Ang Mo Kio, Singapore. Situated underneath Ang Mo Kio Avenue 4, the station serves various landmarks including the Kebun Baru Heights Estate, Kebun Baru Community Centre, and CHIJ Saint Nicholas Girls' School.

First announced in August 2012 as part of the Thomson Line (TSL), the station was constructed as part of TEL Phase 2 (TEL2) with the merger of the TSL and the Eastern Region Line (ERL). Building the station required multiple traffic diversions while having to construct the station along the slope. Opening on 28 August 2021 along with the TEL2 stations, Mayflower station features a unique honeycomb motif and is decorated with bird sculptures as part of the Art-in-Transit artwork in the station.

== History ==
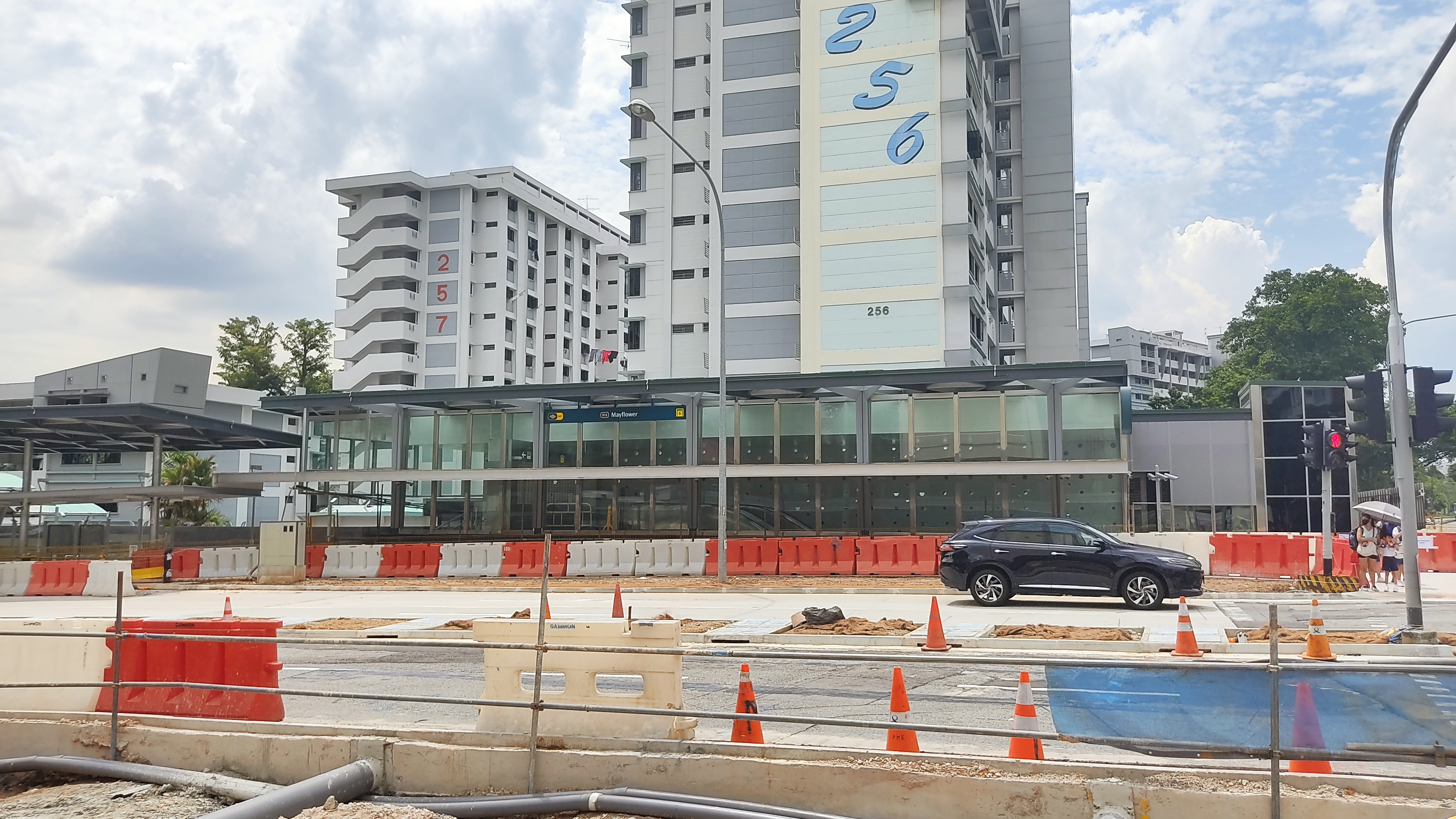
Exit 6 of the station nearing completion during its construction

Mayflower station was first announced as part of the 22-station Thomson Line (TSL) on 29 August 2012. In October 2013, the contract for the design and construction of Mayflower station was awarded to Gammon Construction Limited Singapore Branch at S$174 million (US$137.3 million). The station's construction began in 2014, with a scheduled completion date of 2020.

On 15 August 2014, the Land Transport Authority (LTA) announced that the TSL would merge with the Eastern Region Line to form the Thomson–East Coast Line (TEL). Mayflower station, along the proposed line, would be constructed as part of TEL2, consisting of six stations between Springleaf and Caldecott. Prime Minister Lee Hsien Loong inaugurated the station's groundbreaking ceremony on 6 September.

Since the station is directly underneath Ang Mo Kio Avenue 4, its construction required traffic to be diverted in 15 phases. The sloping topography created height differences, which made it difficult to position the working platforms for the boring rigs and cranes to be used for the construction. Barriers were installed to minimise noise pollution, with workers draping noise curtains on heavy machinery.

With restrictions imposed on construction due to the COVID-19 pandemic, the TEL2 completion date was pushed to 2021. On 14 December 2020, it was further announced that the opening of TEL2 was delayed to the third quarter of 2021 so the rail system software for the line could be reviewed. As announced during a visit by Transport Minister S. Iswaran at Caldecott station on 30 June 2021, the station began operations on 28 August 2021.

== Station details ==
Station Interior

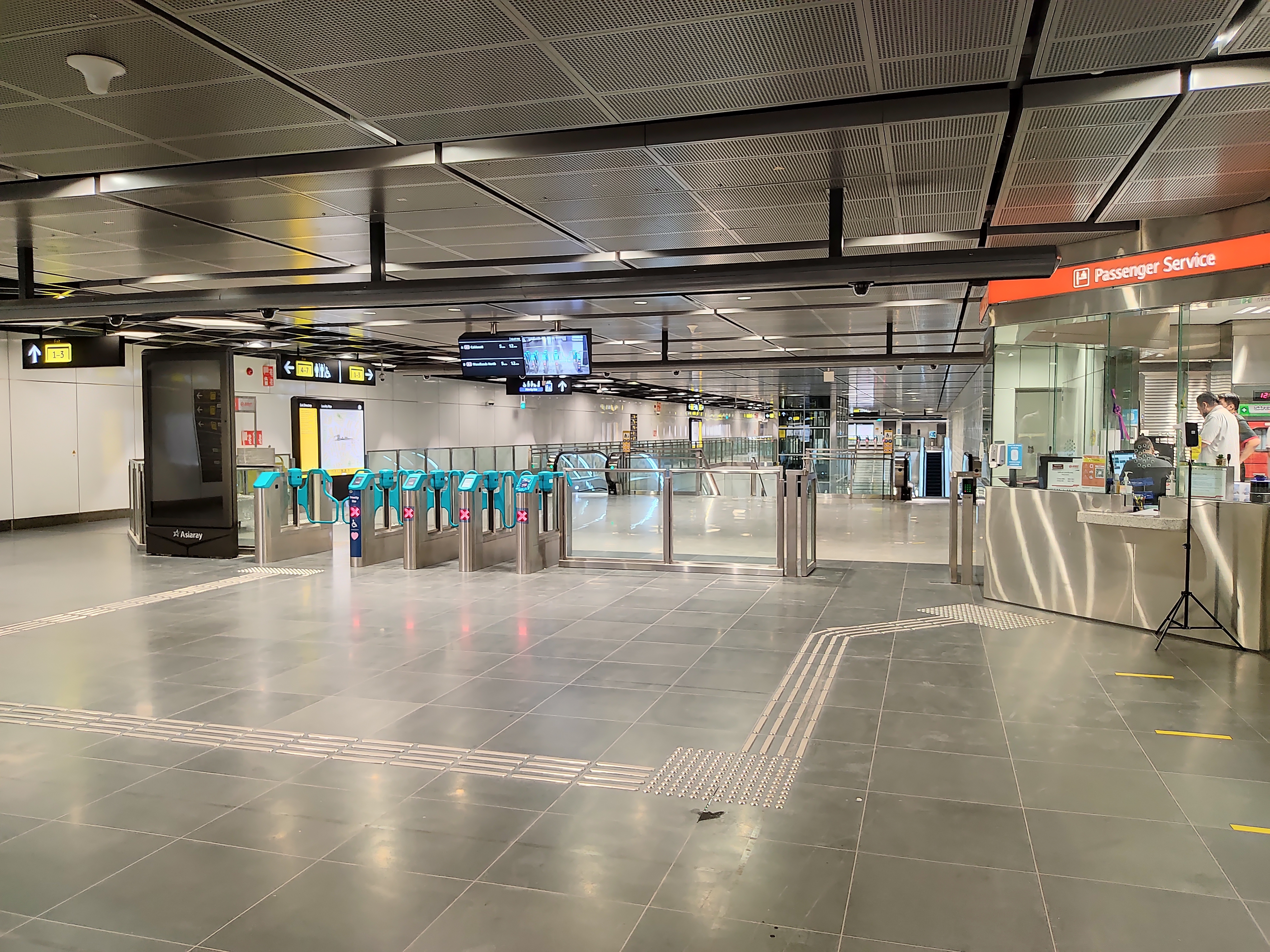
Concourse level

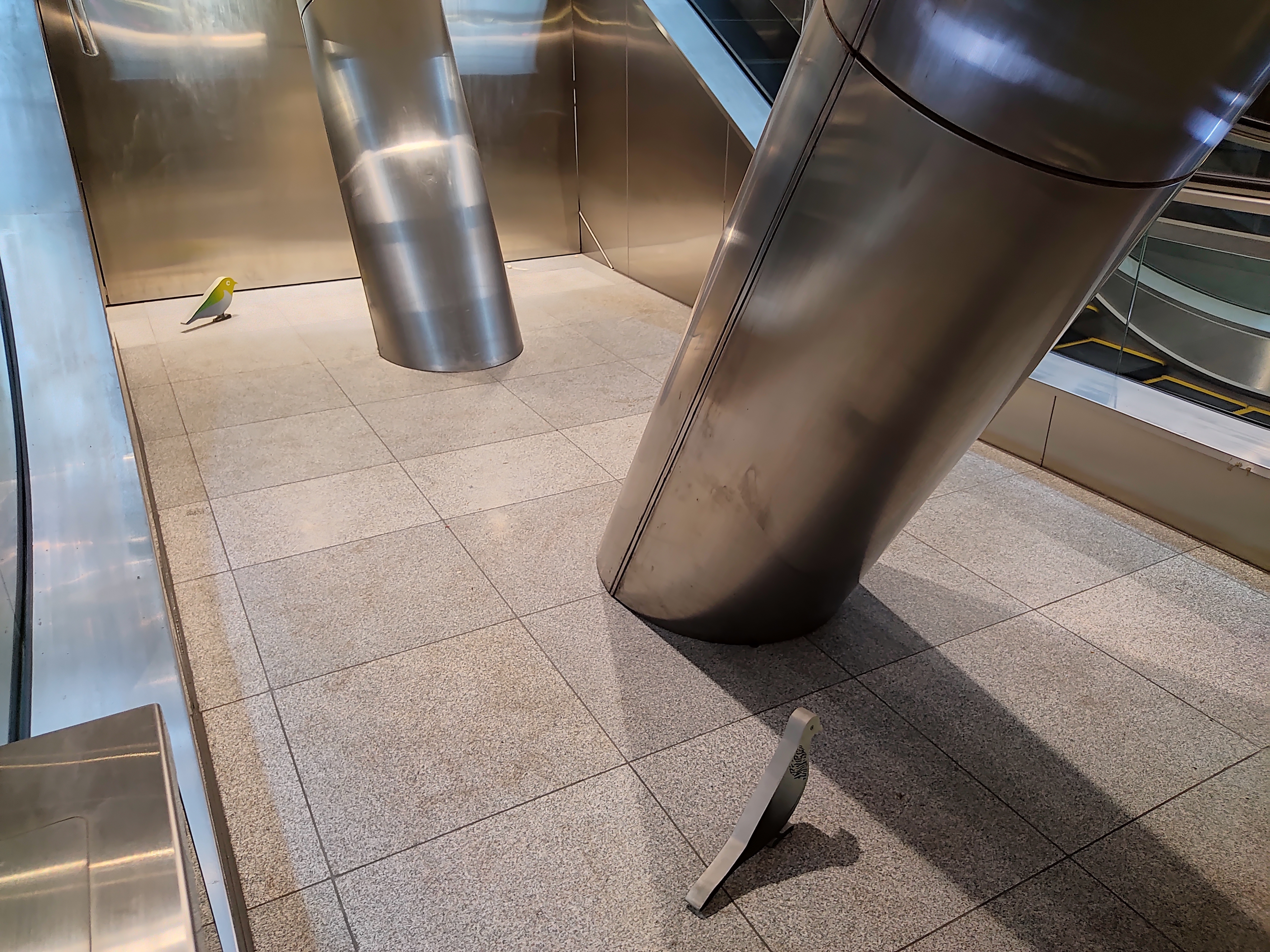
Bird sculptures at the platform level as part of the Art-in-Transit artwork

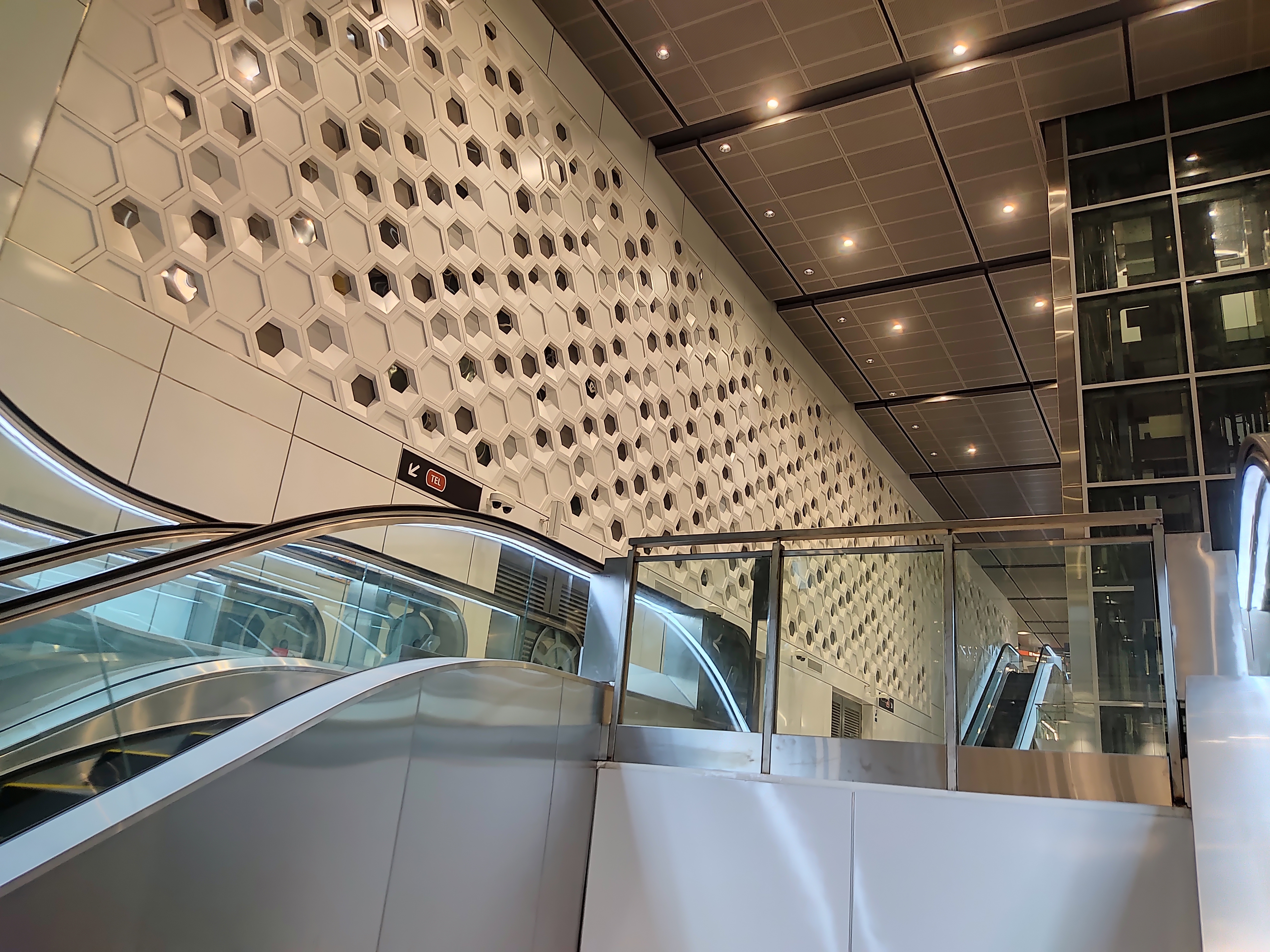
Art in the mezzanine

Mayflower station serves the TEL and is between the Lentor and Bright Hill stations. The official station code is TE6. Being part of the TEL, the station is operated by SMRT Trains. Train frequencies on the TEL range from 3 to 6 minutes. Mayflower station has seven entrances, the most among the TEL2 stations. These entrances connect to the various landmarks nearby, including Kebun Baru Community Club, Mayflower Market & Food Centre, Ang Mo Kio Joint Temple and Ang Mo Kio Methodist Church. Educational institutions around the station include CHIJ Saint Nicholas Girls' School and Mayflower Secondary School.

Designed by Ong&Ong, the linkways, roof panels and the entrances feature hexagonal motifs inspired by the honeycomb. The entrances are barrier-free, allowing easier access for elderly residents in the area. Reflecting the area's heritage as a songbird-watching community, the station is decorated with 22 bird sculptures as part of an Art-in-Transit artwork by Song-Ming Ang. The bird sculptures depict the seven species of birds that are kept as pets in Singapore, including the Oriental white-eye, the red-whiskered bulbul and the zebra dove.

Mayflower station is a designated Civil Defence (CD) shelter and contains a reinforced structure with blast doors. During a chemical attack, the air vents of the station can be shut to prevent the circulation of toxic gases. The CD shelter has dedicated cubicles for chemical decontamination alongside dry toilets.
