= Yio Chu Kang MRT station =

Mass Rapid Transit station in Singapore

Yio Chu Kang NS15 杨厝港 இயோ சூ காங்
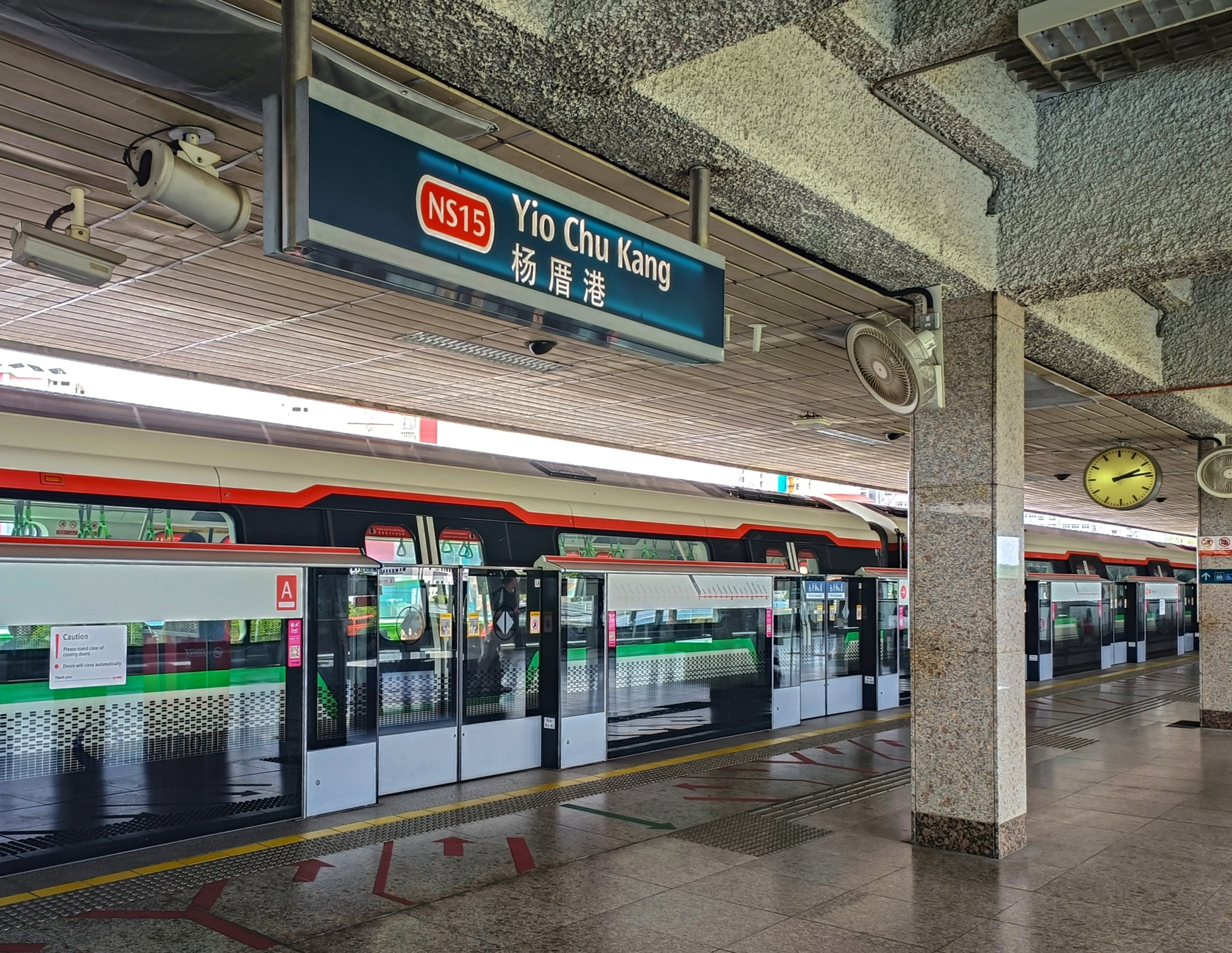
- Platform of Yio Chu Kang MRT station.

General information
- Location: 3000 Ang Mo Kio Avenue 8, Singapore 569813
- Coordinates: 01°22′54.86″N 103°50′41.34″E
- System: Mass Rapid Transit (MRT) station
- Owner: Land Transport Authority
- Operator: SMRT Trains
- Line: North–South Line
- Platforms: 2 (1 island platform)
- Tracks: 2
- Connections: Yio Chu Kang, Taxi

Construction
- Structure type: Elevated
- Platform levels: 1
- Accessible: Yes

Other information
- Station code: YCK

History
- Opened: 7 November 1987; 38 years ago

Passengers
- June 2024: 17,870 per day

Services
Preceding station	Mass Rapid Transit	Following station
Khatib towards Jurong East	North–South Line	Ang Mo Kio towards Marina South Pier
Track layout
Location
- Location within Singapore Rail

Yio Chu Kang MRT station is an above-ground Mass Rapid Transit (MRT) station on the North–South Line in Ang Mo Kio, Singapore, near the junction of Ang Mo Kio Avenue 6 and Ang Mo Kio Avenue 8.

This station primarily serves students of adjacent educational institutions such as Anderson Serangoon Junior College and Nanyang Polytechnic, as well as the residential and industrial estates in the northern part of Ang Mo Kio.

The section of tracks between this station and Khatib MRT station is the longest between any two stations on the MRT network. Opened on 7 November 1987, Yio Chu Kang station is one of the five stations that collectively make up Singapore's oldest MRT stations.

== History ==
Yio Chu Kang station was first included in the early plans of the MRT system to be part of the North–South Line in May 1982. Initially meant to be part of Phase II of the system, it was later announced in June 1983 to be an extension of Phase I, which went from Ang Mo Kio to Marina Bay as it would lighten the passenger load coming from Yio Chu Kang for said station, which was projected to be one of the most heavily used stations in the initial system. This segment was given priority as it passed through areas that had a higher demand for public transport, such as the densely populated housing estates of Toa Payoh and Ang Mo Kio and the Central Area. The line aimed to relieve the traffic congestion on the Thomson–Sembawang road corridor.

External media
- Map for Yio Chu Kang station Source:The Straits Times
- Artist's impression of Yio Chu Kang Source: The Straits Times

By January 1984, the contract for the designs works of Ang Mo Kio and Yio Chu Kang stations as well as the viaducts from San Teng to Yio Chu Kang was awarded to Mott, Hay and Anderson. In October 1984, the contract for the construction of Yio Chu Kang station, along with the adjacent Ang Mo Kio station and the overground tracks connecting the two stations to Bishan station and Bishan Depot, was awarded to Hong Kong company Paul Y. Construction at a sum of S$82.66 million (US$38.75 million) where it beat 12 other bids. In order to complement the local pool of workers, Paul Y. will bring 150 Hong Kong workers. The station was completed by April 1987, and it opened on 7 November 1987, as part of the first section of the MRT system.

Installation of half-height platform screen doors began on 15 August 2011, and they commenced operation on 18 October that year.

=== Incidents ===
On 3 March 2003, a 23-year-old drove his car onto an MRT track off Lentor Avenue, in the sector between Yio Chu Kang and Khatib, the first accident of its kind in the 15 years of MRT operations in Singapore. The accident occurred when the car, which was travelling at 87 kilometres per hour (54 mph) along Lentor Avenue – the speed limit was 70 kilometres per hour (43 mph) – mounted an 18 centimetres (7.1 in) kerb, crossed 6 metres (20 ft) of grass verge (inclusive of a 1.5 metres (4 ft 11 in) wide pavement), jumped over a 1.5 metres (4 ft 11 in) drain, went through a fence 2 metres (6 ft 7 in) away from the track, and went uphill onto a steep stone embankment before landing on the track. Witnesses tried to remove the car from the tracks to prevent a possible collision, however an oncoming train from Yio Chu Kang stopped their efforts. One of the witnesses signalled the train driver to stop. Although the train driver was not able to stop in time, he was able to slow the train down enough to prevent derailment.

== Station details ==
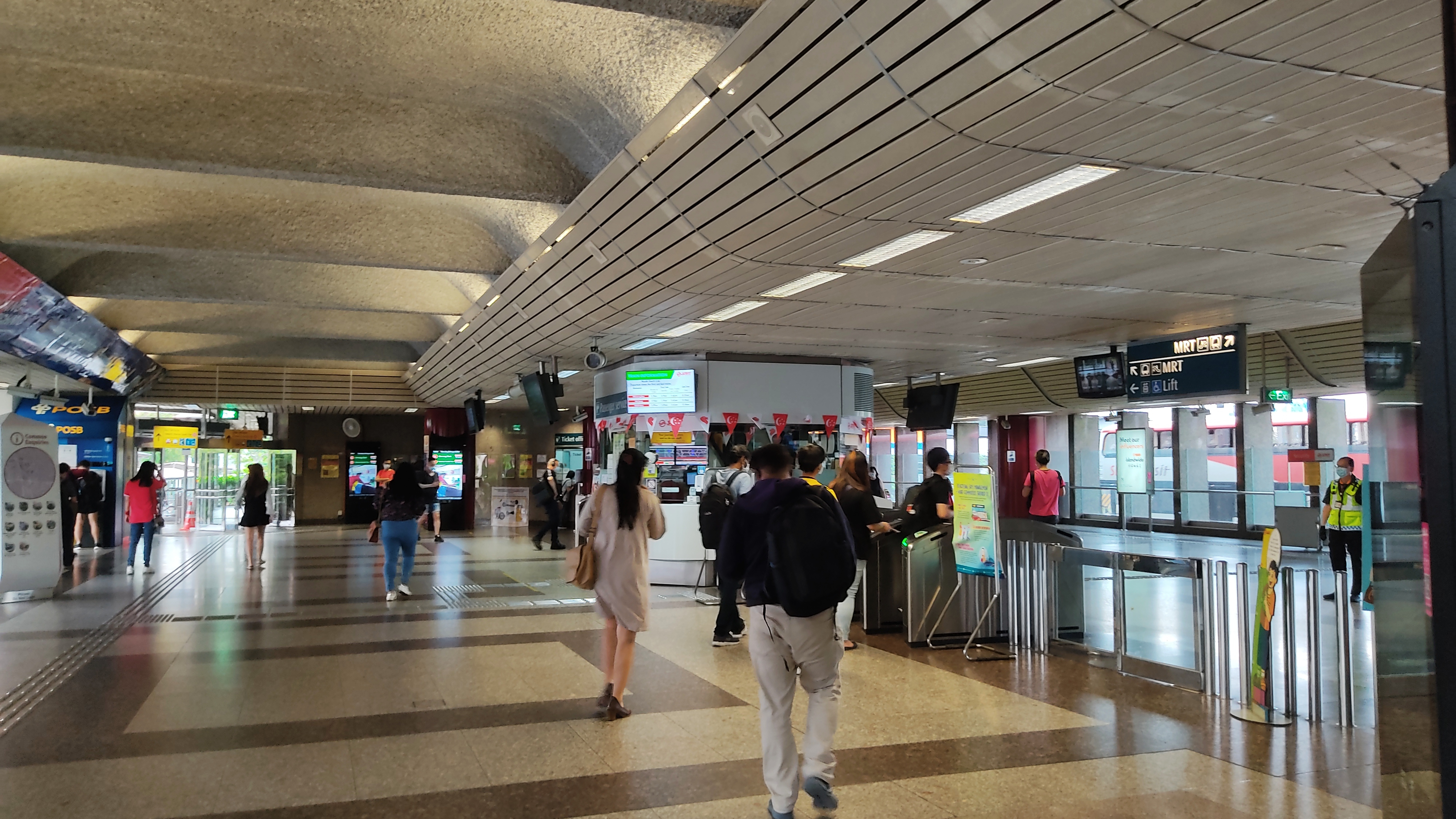
Yio Chu Kang MRT concourse

=== Location ===
The station is located on a plot of land adjacent to Ang Mo Kio Avenues 6, 8 and 9. It is located near landmarks such as Anderson Serangoon Junior College, Nanyang Polytechnic, Yio Chu Kang Stadium and Presbyterian High School.

=== Services ===
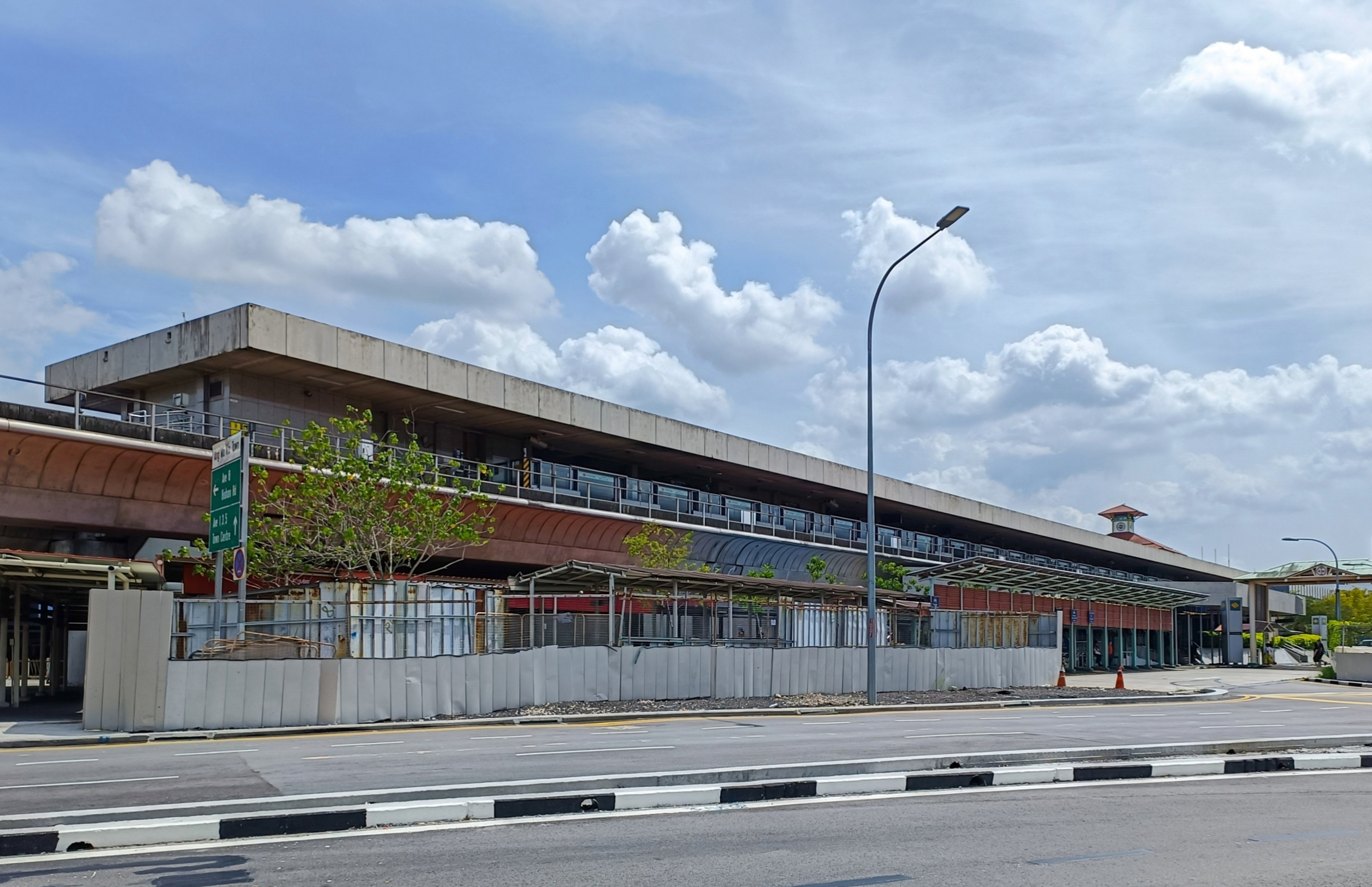
Station exterior.

The station is served by the North–South Line, between Khatib and Ang Mo Kio, and has the station code NS15 (formerly N10) on official maps. Trains run at 2 to 5 minute intervals during peak hours, and at 5 minute intervals at other times.

=== Station design ===
The station was designed by Mott, Hay and Anderson, and it consists of a ticketing concourse on the ground floor and the station platforms on the upper level. The ticketing concourse is encircled by glass walls, while the platforms are open to the surroundings. These features, along with slim columns clad in tiles, are intended to give the station a bright and graceful look.
