= Ang Mo Kio Town Garden West =

Park in Ang Mo Kio

Coordinates: 1.3743688°N 103.8434332°E

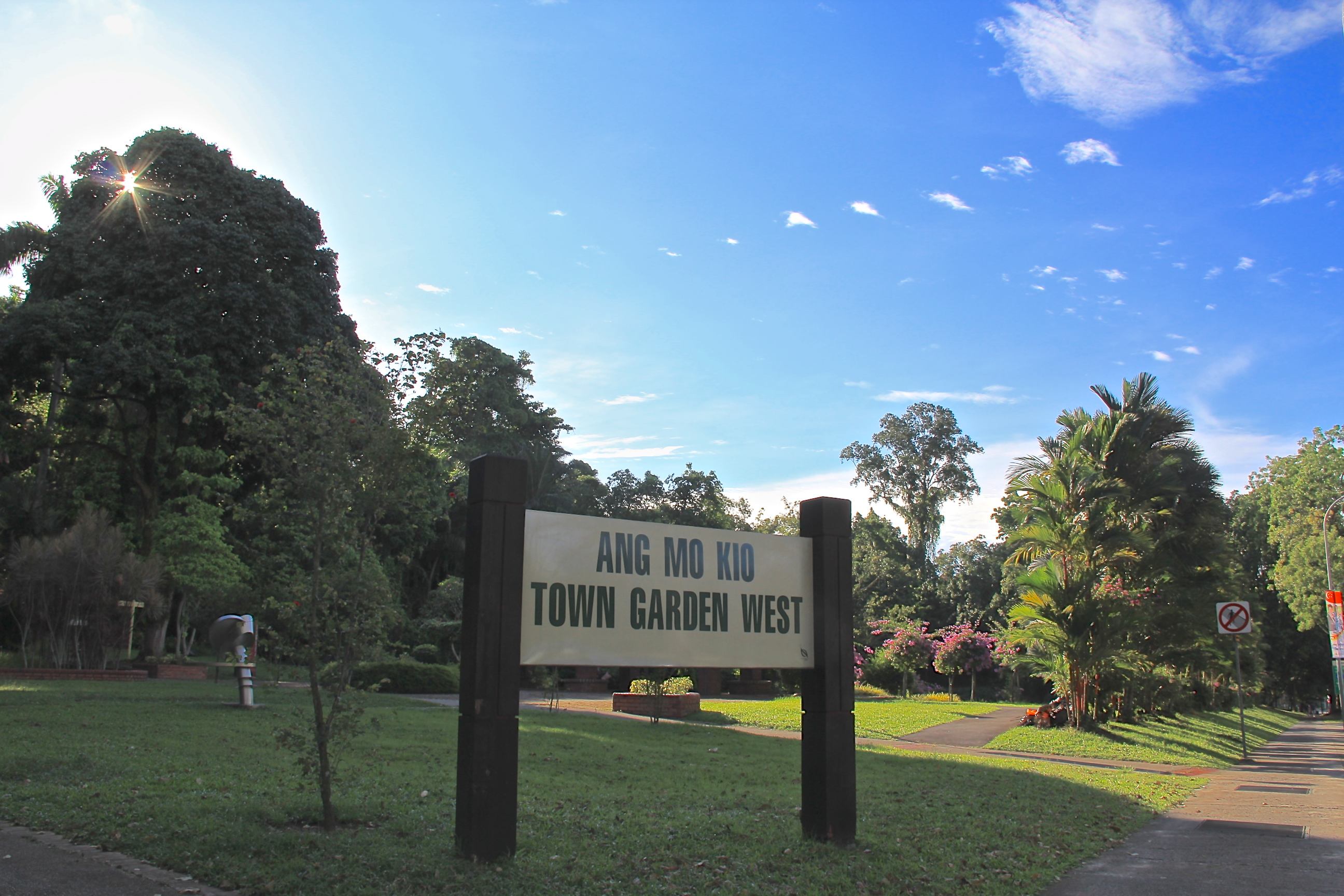
Ang Mo Kio Town Garden West

Ang Mo Kio Town Garden West is a community park that is situated opposite Ang Mo Kio Library, along Ang Mo Kio Avenue 6.

The park is popular for recreational activities including jogging and a playground, and there is a McDonald's restaurant located at the western side of the park and features a drive-thru facility. The park has been designated with the code 9V-0003 by the international Parks On The Air award program, and so is regularly 'activated' by Amateur Radio operators using portable equipment.

== History ==
The park was the second park to be developed for Ang Mo Kio, and was constructed over a 22 hectares (54 acres) hill. It was completed in 1983 at a cost of S$2.7 million, and initially featured an observatory terrace, an outdoor stage and play areas for children.

== See also ==
- Ang Mo Kio Town Garden East
- List of parks in Singapore
