= Parks on the Air =

Amateur radio operating award program

- Abbreviation: POTA
- Formation: January 5, 2018; 8 years ago
- Type: Nonprofit
- Registration no.: 82-3908364
- Purpose: Radiosport
- Headquarters: Severna Park, Maryland
- Website: parksontheair.com

Parks on the Air (POTA) is an international radiosport award program that encourages licensed amateur radio operators to operate portable equipment in a variety of parks and public lands. The goal of the program is enjoyment of amateur radio in the outdoors while also promoting emergency awareness and communications preparation. Operators are expected to always respect other park users and local regulations. POTA issues awards to participants based on a wide range of criteria including the total number of radio contacts made, number made on each amateur radio band, and for different modes of communication including voice, Morse code or FT8.

== History ==
Parks on the Air (POTA), similar in style to the Summits on the Air (SOTA) program created in the UK in 2002, has its roots in the World Wide Flora and Fauna (WWFF) program, which began in 2012 to encourage amateur radio operators to operate portable from protected nature areas. The United States branch of WWFF was known as KFF (K for USA in the WWFF system). Initially, Jason Johnston (W3AAX) served as the national coordinator for KFF, overseeing the program's activities in the United States.

However, the landscape of park-based amateur radio activities began to change. In 2016, the ARRL (American Radio Relay League) ran a one-year event called National Parks on the Air (NPOTA), which gained significant popularity. Following the success of NPOTA, there was a desire to continue a similar program. This led to the formation of Parks on the Air (POTA) as a separate entity from WWFF-KFF. The split became evident when park designations began to diverge, starting from KFF-4447, marking the point where POTA and WWFF-KFF began to operate as distinct programs. POTA has since grown into a wildly successful program with over 49,000 active hunters with 10 or more parks (27 June 2025) and 29,000 activators (27 June 2025), promoting portable operations from parks and protected areas worldwide.

A nonprofit organization was founded in 2018 to continue POTA permanently. Since then it has been a popular method of community and student outreach, with events taking place both in parks and sometimes at other public events. The organization worked to expand worldwide and participation now occurs around the clock and around the world, in locations as diverse as the Caribbean, India, China and Europe. Park locations range from large national parks covering many square miles to small urban locations and islands.

In early 2024, POTA updated its reference codes and other data systems to match the ISO standard. For example, park K-0001 became US-0001; I-0001 became IT-0001. Also, countries' territories would be designated to match their DXCC island entities. For example, park K-0110 in Guam became GU-0001.

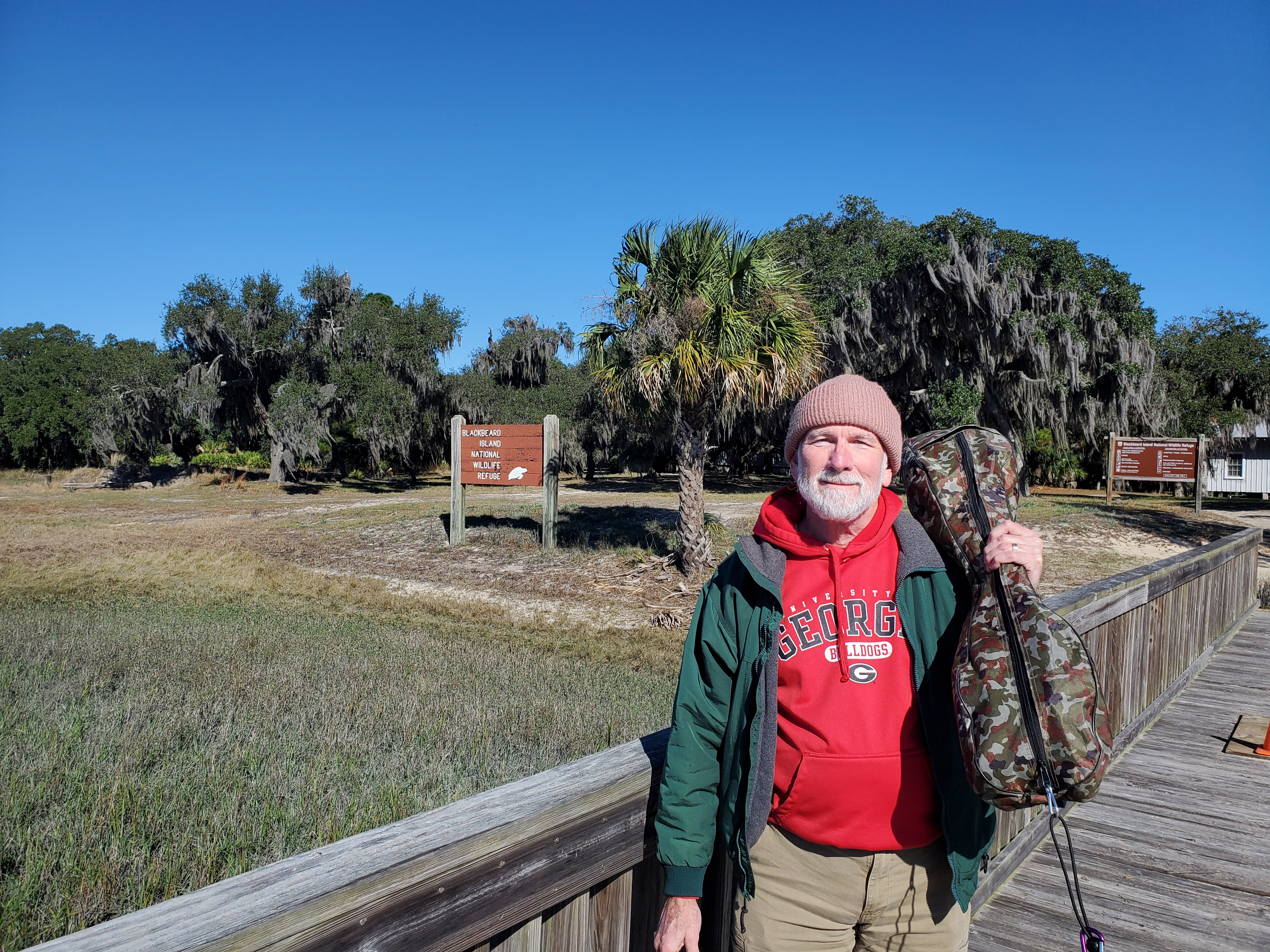
Preparing to activate Park US-0260 Blackbeard Island NWR walkway

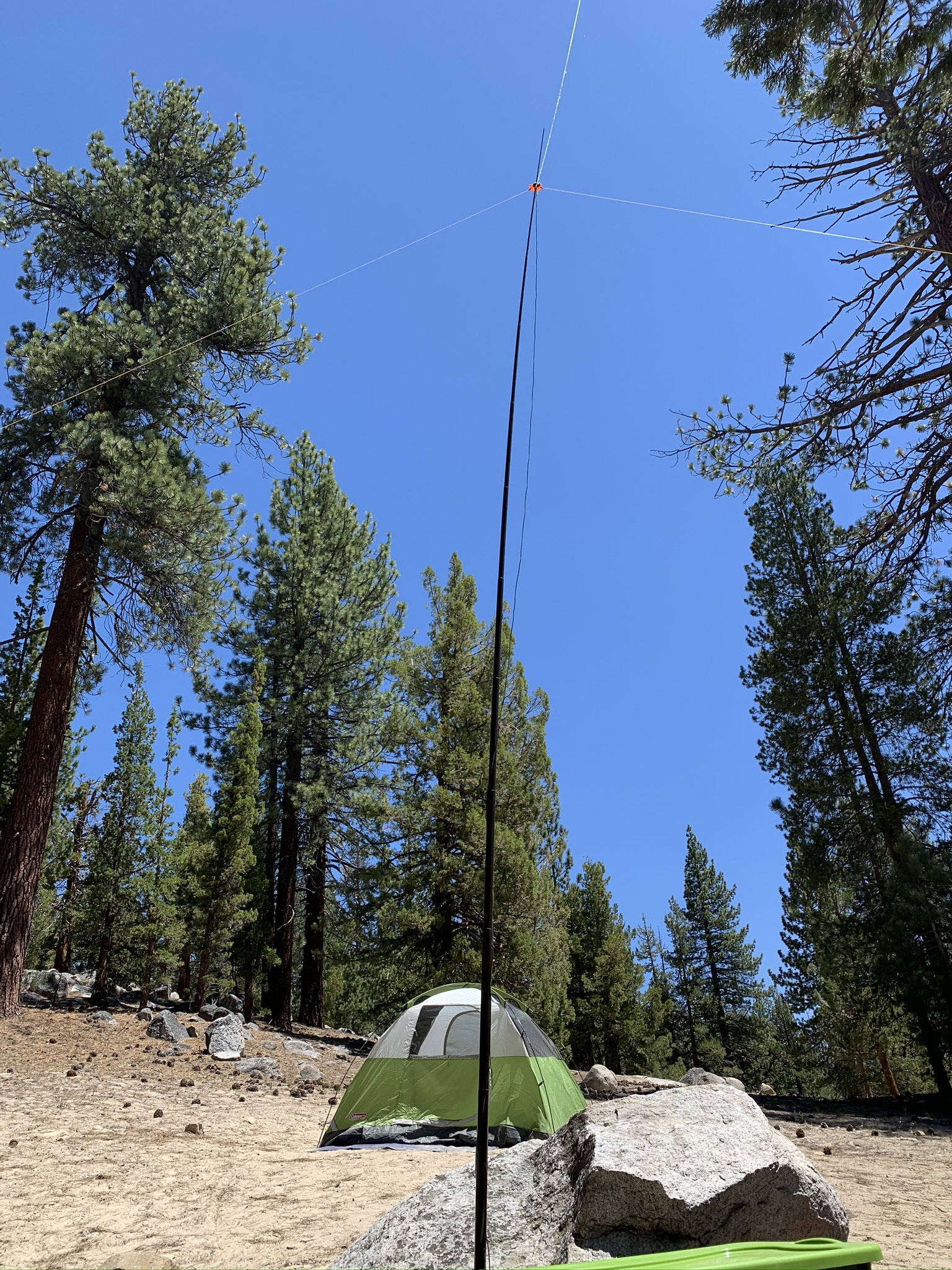
Portable amateur radio station during a POTA activation

== Participation ==
Amateur radio operators who set up a temporary station at a park are known as activators, while others who 'spot' and complete contacts with them are called hunters. Activations can take place on the initiative of an individual operator, or as part of organized group events such as Field Days.

Equipment used is typically small, battery operated, and may have been constructed by the operator themselves. The radio may be hand-held, carried in a backpack or a 'go box', or it could be mounted in a vehicle, as permitted by the park operator. Antennas may be small enough to form part of a hand-held unit for VHF and UHF operations, or be ground-spike or tripod-mounted temporary whips or loops for longer radio wavelengths. Where permitted by local regulations, kites, trees or lightweight masts and fishing poles are sometimes used to suspend wire antennas as high as possible to optimise performance. In this way, with patience, skill, and good luck with propagation conditions, contacts can sometimes be made worldwide using radios little larger than a pack of playing cards, although some activators prefer to use higher power, more sophisticated and larger equipment.

Activators can signal their intent to be on the air in advance using the POTA website, so that hunters are ready for them. Activators log all the contacts they make and upload them to the POTA website, which then allocates the rewards and shows league tables for everyone involved. A successful activation requires a minimum of 10 contacts (QSOs) from a park in the designated list within a single UTC day (Zulu day).
