= Ang Mo Kio MRT station =

Mass rapid transit station in Singapore

Ang Mo Kio NS16 CR11 宏茂桥 அங் மோ கியோ
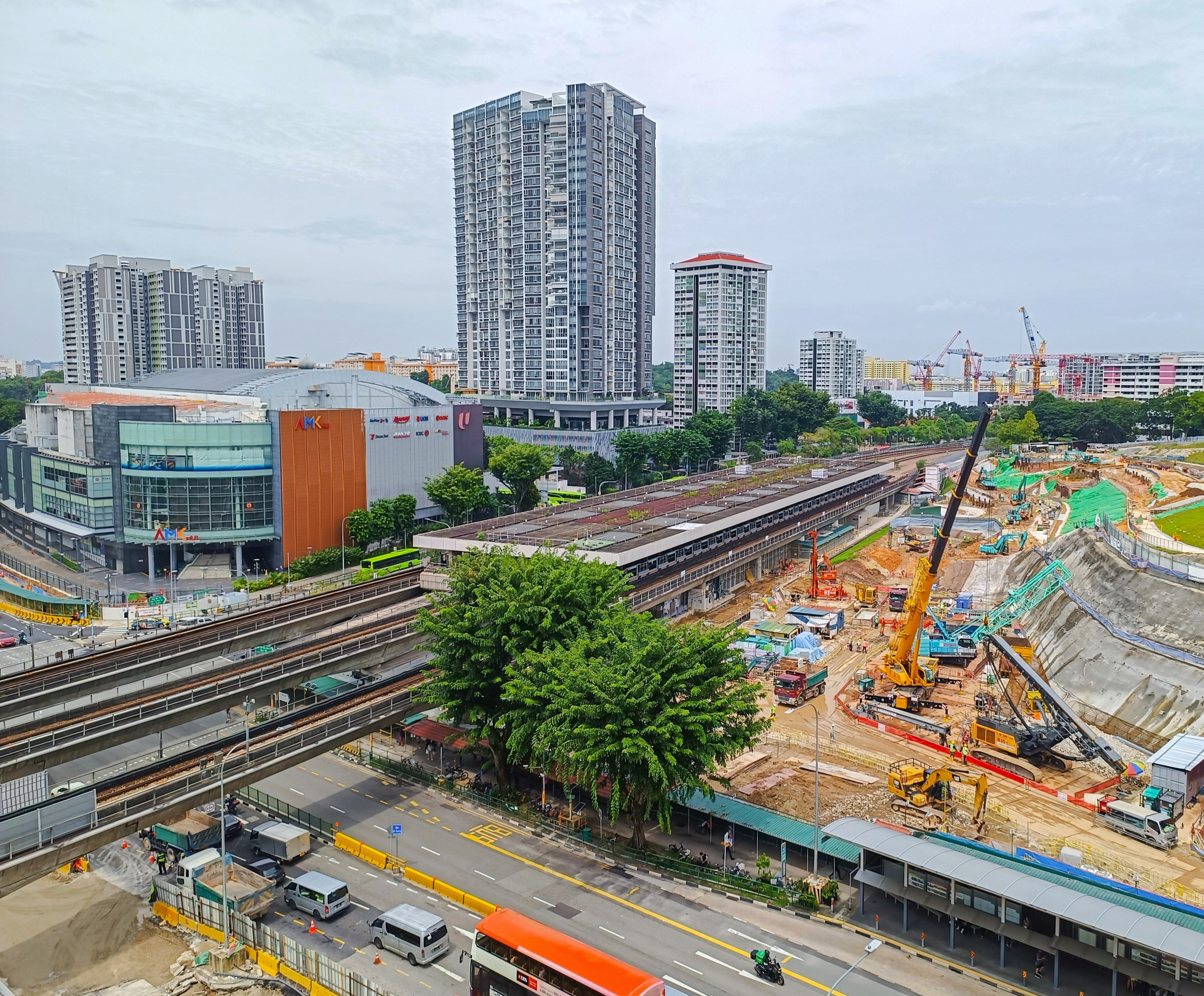
- Exterior of the NSL station with the CRL construction site

General information
- Location: 2450 Ang Mo Kio Avenue 8, Singapore 569811 (NSL); 50 Ang Mo Kio Avenue 3, Singapore 569942 (CRL)
- Coordinates: 01°22′12.06″N 103°50′58.02″E
- System: Mass Rapid Transit (MRT) station
- Owner: Land Transport Authority
- Operator: SMRT Trains (North–South Line)
- Line: North–South Line Cross Island Line
- Platforms: 4 (2 island platforms) + 2 (1 island platform) (U/C)
- Tracks: 3 + 2 (U/C)
- Connections: Ang Mo Kio, Taxi

Construction
- Structure type: Elevated (NSL); Underground (CRL)
- Platform levels: 1 + 1 (U/C)
- Parking: Yes (AMK Hub)
- Cycle facilities: Yes (opposite AMK Hub)
- Accessible: Yes

Other information
- Station code: AMK

History
- Opened: 7 November 1987; 38 years ago (North–South Line)
- Opening: 2030; 4 years' time (Cross Island Line)

Passengers
- June 2024: 39,720 per day

Services
| Preceding station | Mass Rapid Transit | Following station |
|---|---|---|
| Yio Chu Kang towards Jurong East | North–South Line | Bishan towards Marina South Pier |
| Tavistock towards Aviation Park | Cross Island Line Future service | Teck Ghee towards Bright Hill |
Track layout
Location
- Location within Singapore Rail

Ang Mo Kio MRT station is an above-ground Mass Rapid Transit (MRT) station on the North–South Line in Ang Mo Kio, Singapore.

Located at the junction of Ang Mo Kio Avenue 3 and Ang Mo Kio Avenue 8, beside Ang Mo Kio Town Garden East, the station is connected to AMK Hub, Ang Mo Kio Bus Interchange and the Ang Mo Kio Town Centre via an underground walkway.

Opened on 7 November 1987, Ang Mo Kio station is one of the five stations that collectively make up Singapore's oldest MRT stations. This station will become an interchange station along the Cross Island Line in 2030.

== History ==
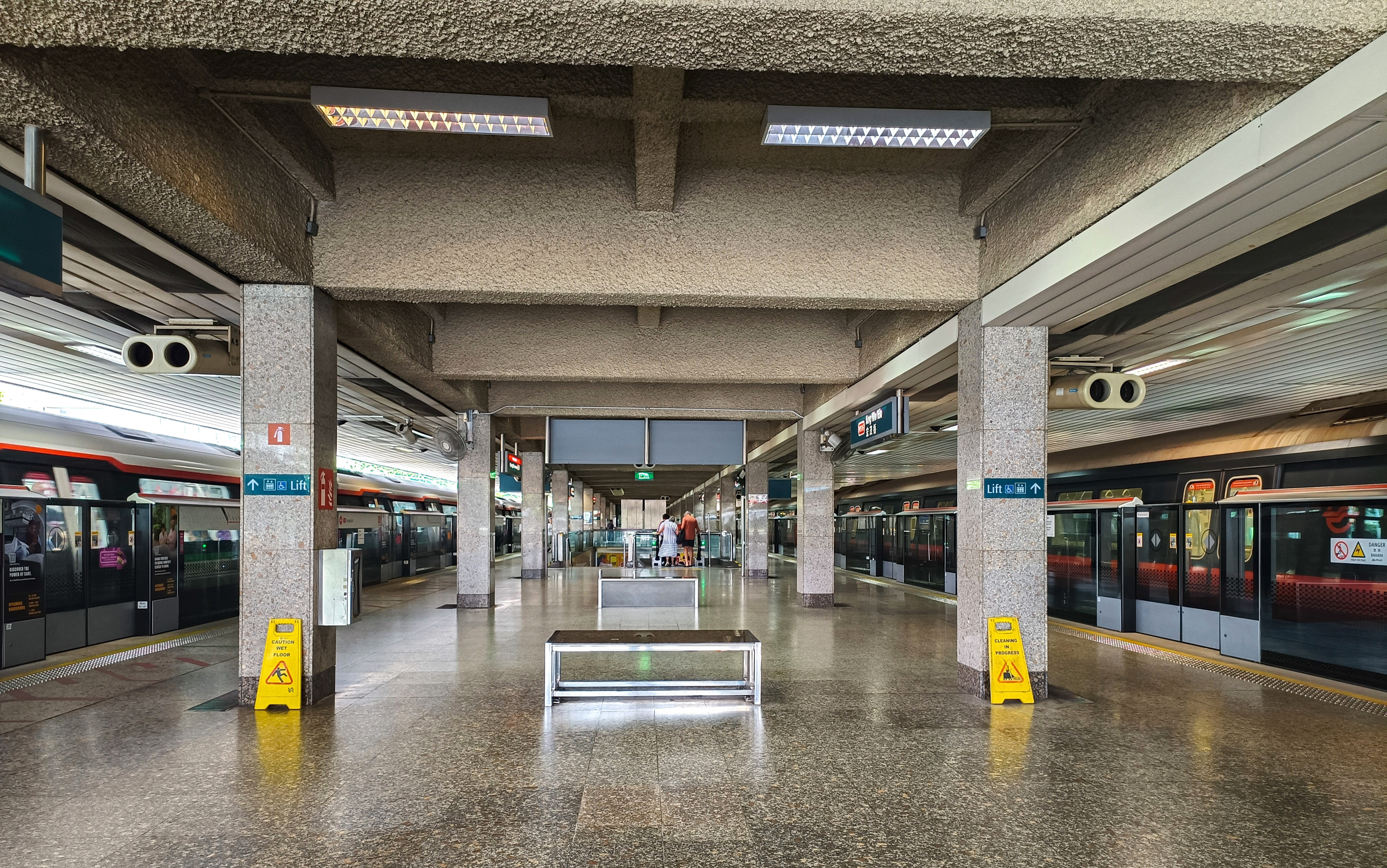
Platform of Ang Mo Kio station

In June 1983, the terminus of the North–South Line was announced to have been extended from Ang Mo Kio station to Yio Chu Kang.

On 12 June 1984, the contract was shortlisted for the construction of a viaduct from San Teng MRT station to Yio Chu Kang, together with Ang Mo Kio and Yio Chu Kang stations under Contract 102. This contract also specified that the stretch of Ang Mo Kio Street 53 all the way to Ang Mo Kio Avenue 8 would have to be permanently closed in 1985 and levelled, so that the railway could be laid on the ground level.

Ang Mo Kio was the second station on the North South line to receive MJ Air Tech high-volume low-speed fans. The fans were placed into service on 30 June 2012, along with those installed at Jurong East.

Installation of noise barriers from Ang Mo Kio Avenue 3 to Ang Mo Kio Avenue 5 is completed.

=== Cross Island Line Interchange ===
On 25 January 2019, LTA announced that Ang Mo Kio station would be part of the proposed Cross Island line (CRL). The station will be constructed as part of Phase 1, consisting of 12 stations between Aviation Park and Bright Hill, and is expected to be completed in 2030. A second phase from Bright Hill to Jurong Lake District is targeted to open in 2032.

A contract for the design and construction of Ang Mo Kio CRL Station and associated tunnels was awarded to Gammon Construction and Engineering Pte. Ltd – Bachy Soletanche Singapore Pte. Ltd. Joint Venture on 20 July 2021 at a sum of S$644 million. Construction will start in the fourth quarter of 2021, with completion in 2030.

Initially expected to open in 2029, the restrictions on the construction due to the COVID-19 pandemic has led to delays in the CRL line completion, and the date was pushed to 2030.

== Incidents ==
On 3 April 2011, a 14-year-old Thai citizen lost both her legs after she fell onto the tracks of Ang Mo Kio station and was hit by a train. She left Singapore on 13 June that year after recuperating in hospital. SMRT had reportedly offered the family S$5,000 as compensation. The victim's father rejected the compensation as her prosthetic legs would cost around S$100,000 and require replacement every three to five years. Her father sued SMRT for S$3.4 million the amount equivalent to the price for the 20 pairs of prosthetic legs that Peneakchansak will need in her lifetime.

On 20 June 2011, SMRT clarified that the money offered to Peneakchansak was a gesture of goodwill and not compensation. The transport company said compensation would only be made after investigations had concluded. SMRT also said that the S$10,000 offered to her family to travel to Singapore when she was still in hospital was also a gesture of goodwill. In its defence papers on 1 September that year, the SMRT reiterates that all the safety warnings and precautions – such as the yellow lines – were in place and that the distance which the train travelled after the driver slammed on the brakes were within "safety specifications" and argues that Peneakchansak's "negligence" contributed to her falling "onto the tracks at the MRT station on her own accord". It also claimed that the girl was "aware of the danger of the oncoming trains and that by standing behind the yellow safety line until the train had stopped", she would have been reasonably safe from falling onto the tracks and pointed out that the girl had failed to keep a proper lookout for the oncoming train and take reasonable care of her own well-being despite knowing the risks of falling. It adds that she had failed to stand behind the yellow safety line until the train had stopped despite clear warning signs displayed at the MRT station.

Ang Hin Kee, MP for Ang Mo Kio GRC announced that Ang Mo Kio station would be installed with the half-height platform screen doors on the platform by June, earlier than scheduled. Although it was announced to be completed by that month, it was delayed till 2 December that year before operations began.

== Station details ==
Ang Mo Kio is between Bishan and Yio Chu Kang stations on the North–South Line. The station code is NS16 (formerly N9), and when the Cross Island Line station opens, it will also have a station code of CR11.

The North–South Line station has four platforms serving three tracks, unlike the rest of the stations on the line. Two of the three tracks are used for train movements to and from Bishan Depot.
