= Lorong Chuan =

- Subzone of Serangoon Planning Area

Name transcription(s)
  - Chinese: 罗弄泉
  - Malay: Lorong Chuan
  - Tamil: லோரோங் சுவான்
- Location of Lorong Chuan within Singapore
- Coordinates: 1°21′13″N 103°51′51″E
- Country: Singapore
- Region: North-East Region
- Planning Area: Serangoon

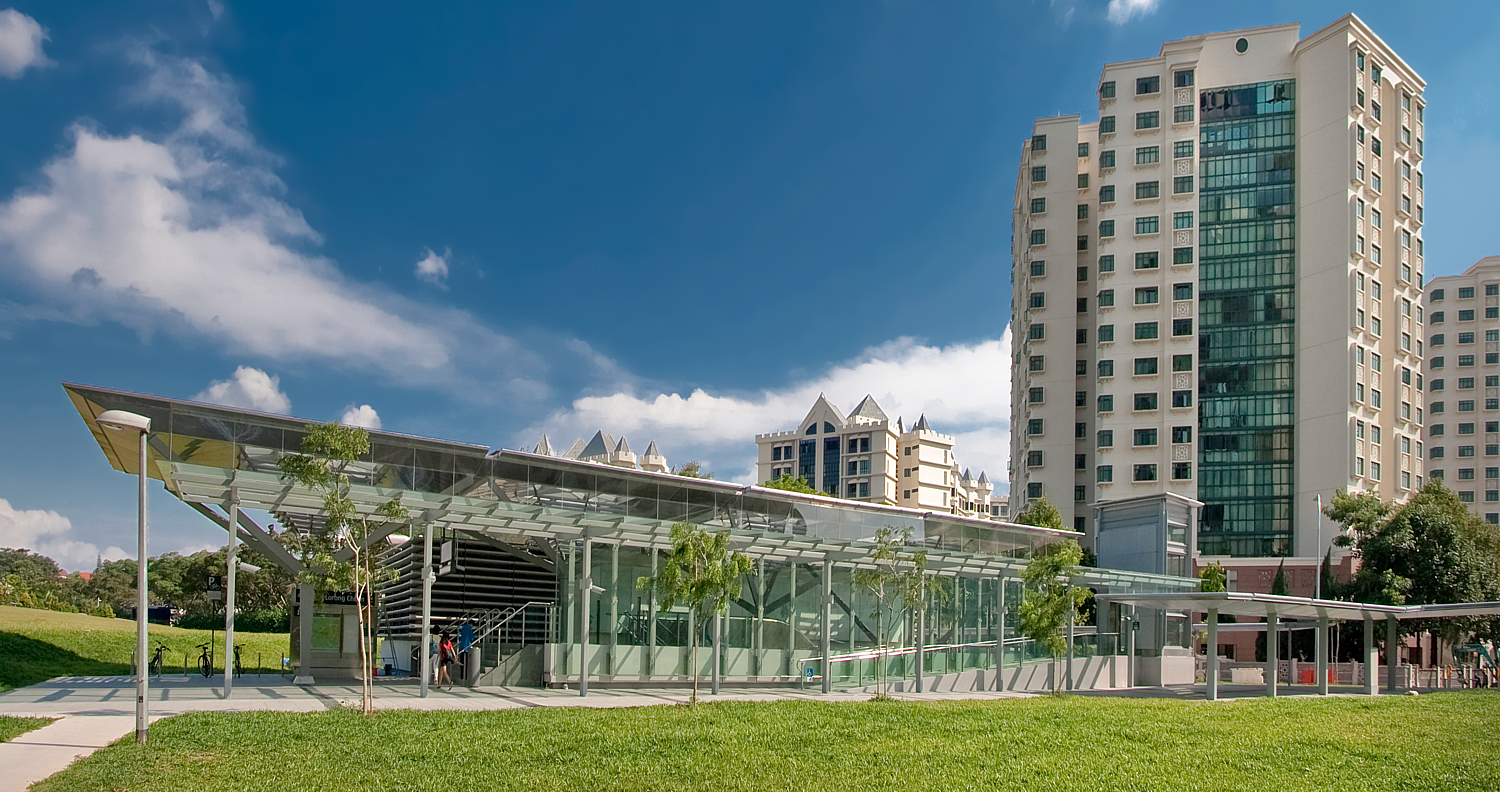
Exterior of Lorong Chuan MRT station

Lorong Chuan is a subzone and a precinct located in the town of Serangoon in the North-East Region of Singapore.

The road which the precinct is named after, links the Central Expressway to Serangoon Garden Way in Serangoon Gardens. It is in the north-eastern region of Singapore. The area around the street is named after this road. There are both public and private housing flanking the street.

It is now served by the Lorong Chuan MRT station on the Circle MRT line. Several bus routes plies through Lorong Chuan vicinity - these include 45, 58, 73, 105, 159, 534 and 568 of which it passes through Lorong Chuan.

== History and etymology ==
Construction on the road started in 1963 and first opened sometime in 1964–65. The area used to contain farmland and kampungs. "Lorong" is the Malay word for a lane or alley, while "Chuan" means "Fountain" in Hokkien, an auspicious name referring to wealth and prosperity.

== Amenities and landmarks ==
=== Lorong Chuan Bridge ===
The iconic Lorong Chuan Bridge is one of the oldest pedestrian bridges in Singapore. Built in 1975, it connects the estates along Li Hwan Drive across Ang Mo Kio Avenue 1 to Lorong Chuan estate. The bridge design resembles a long container box with rows of hexagonal windows at both sides.

=== Other landmarks ===
- Chomp Chomp Food Centre
- New Tech Park
- NTP+ Mall, the new and smallest shopping mall at New Tech Park being opened in April 2021.
- Serangoon Garden Market and Food Centre

== Educational institutions ==
- Nanyang Junior College
- St. Gabriel's Primary School
- Yangzheng Primary School
- Zhonghua Secondary School
- Australian International School Singapore
