= Serangoon Garden =

Serangoon Gardens
- Subzone of Serangoon Planning Area & Housing Estate

Name transcription(s)
  - Chinese: 红砂厘
  - Pinyin: Shílónggānghuāyuán
  - Malay: Taman Serangoon
  - Tamil: சிரங்கூன் பூங்கா
- Serangoon Garden at dusk in 2005
- Country: Singapore
- Planning Area: Serangoon

Serangoon Garden Estate is a residential estate in the Serangoon district of the North-East Region of Singapore.

It is also commonly known as "Ang Sar Lee" (红砂厘) for historical reasons, referring to red zinc roofs of the houses in the estate.

== History ==
Before the 1950s, the area that would become Serangoon Gardens was home to rubber plantations that would eventually be replaced by vegetable farms and flower gardens, leading to it being named as Serangoon Gardens. Serangoon Garden is one of the oldest estates on the island, and was built during the 1950s. It was developed by British private developer Steven Charles Macey, who originally set aside land to build a recreational sports club for the local residents, many of whom were British servicemen and their families. The estate was upgraded in 2001 as part of the Singapore Government's plan to improve the older private housing estates in Singapore. Open roadside drains were covered up. Streetlights and road signs were replaced, and the estate's parks were also upgraded.

Serangoon Garden Circus was used as one of the locations for the country-wide millennium celebrations.

=== Electoral boundaries ===
Until 1988, Serangoon Gardens was a single seat constituency. When the group representation constituency was introduced, Serangoon Gardens became part of the GRC. Since then, it has been part of the Aljunied GRC.

== Housing ==
Serangoon Gardens is generally a private housing estate. There are a variety of types of housing, including terrace homes, semi-detached and bungalows. This area is popular with affluent Singaporeans, with its close proximity to amenities and generally prestigious schools.

== Attractions ==
The food and beverage outlets are located in the estate's central area. Serangoon Garden Circus is at the centre of the estate. In this vicinity, there are cafés, restaurants, coffee shops, fast food restaurants and a shopping mall.

All the roads radiate from the circus, and the houses are located within walking distance. The estate has a tennis and squash centre at Burghley Drive. At Kensington Park Road, there is a country club known as Serangoon Gardens Country Club. Although the Country Club serves its in-house members, members of the public can also enjoy delicious food such as cantonese cuisine - Swatow Garden - which serves popular Hong Kong Dim Sum and dishes.

== Education ==
The International French School of Singapore is in Serangoon Gardens. A French community developed around the school. This community had developed by 2010.

== Amenities ==
Situated behind Maju Avenue is Paramount Building which was developed as Serangoon Garden Village in 2001. A new small shopping mall called MyVillage has opened in its place with NTUC FairPrice Finest and a branch of DBS Bank as its anchor tenants.

== Transport ==
=== Public transport ===
The estate is served by public buses. In addition, on weekday mornings from 7.30 am to 9 am, licensed private bus operators operate an express service plying between Serangoon Gardens and the city centre. The nearest MRT stations are Lorong Chuan MRT station on the Circle Line, and Serangoon MRT station on the North East Line and Circle Line. The upcoming Tavistock MRT station on the Cross Island Line will provide a direct rail connection for residents in the northern part of the estate.

=== Roads ===
There is 1 main road leading into the estate called Serangoon Garden Way.

== See also ==
- Lorong Chuan
