= CR9 =

CR9 may refer to:

- CR9, a postcode district in the CR postcode area
- Cristiano Ronaldo, Portuguese footballer who is currently playing at Al Nassr FC, referencing his first season at Real Madrid.
- The CRJ-900, a regional airliner based on the successful Bombardier CRJ200
- County Route 9; see List of highways numbered 9
- Serangoon North MRT station, Singapore, MRT station code
