= Serangoon =

Planning Area and HDB Town in North-East Region, Singapore

- Planning Area and HDB Town

Other transcription(s)
  - Malay: Serangoon (Rumi) سرڠݢون (Jawi)
  - Chinese: 实龙岗 (Simplified) 實龍崗 (Traditional); Shílónggǎng (Pinyin); Si̍t-lêng-kong (Hokkien POJ)
  - Tamil: சிராங்கூன் Cirāṅkūṉ (Transliteration)
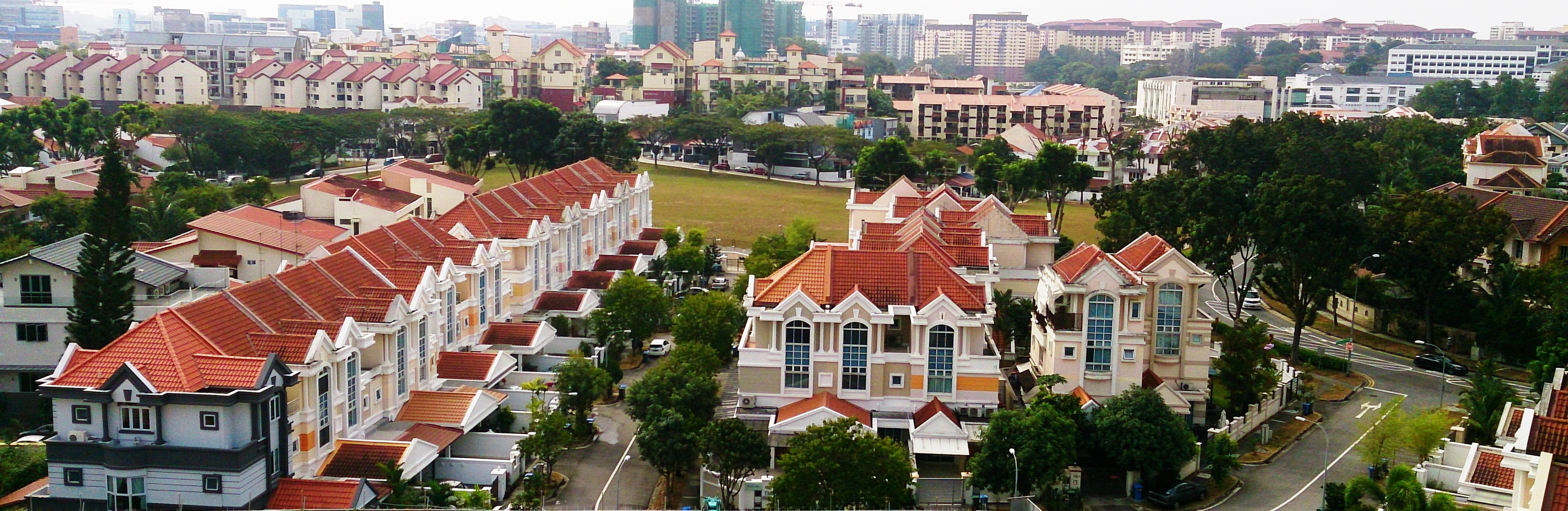
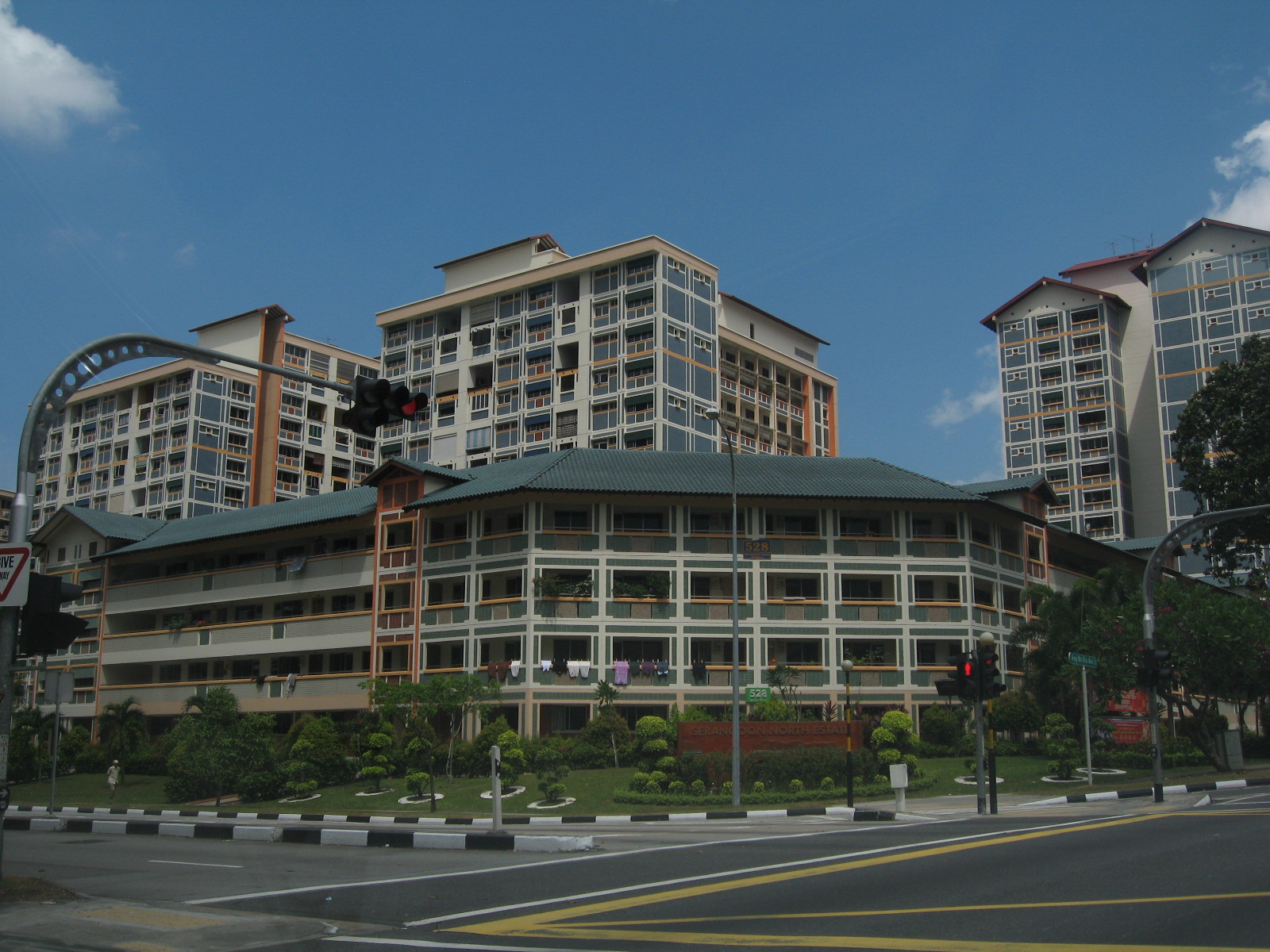
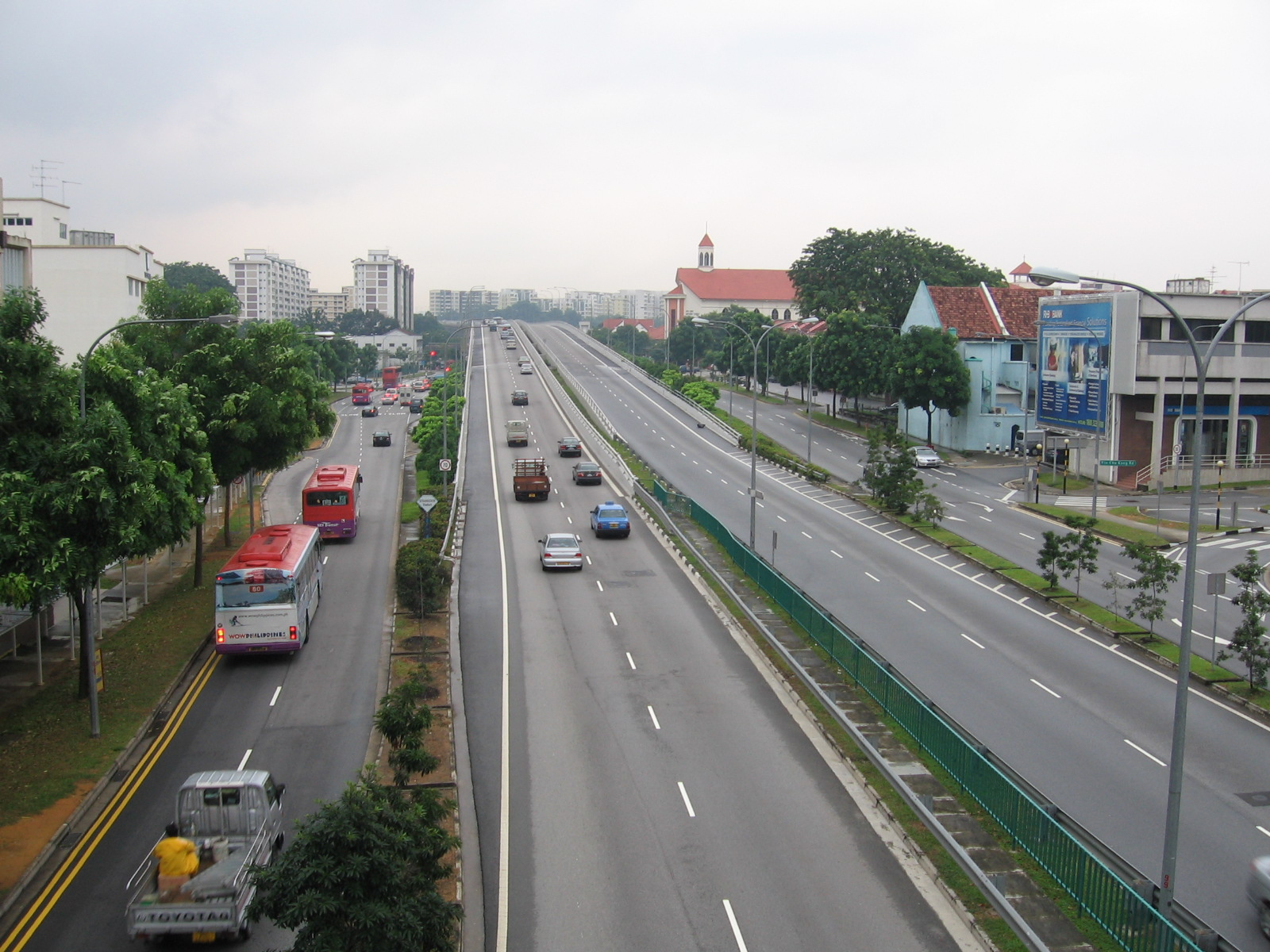
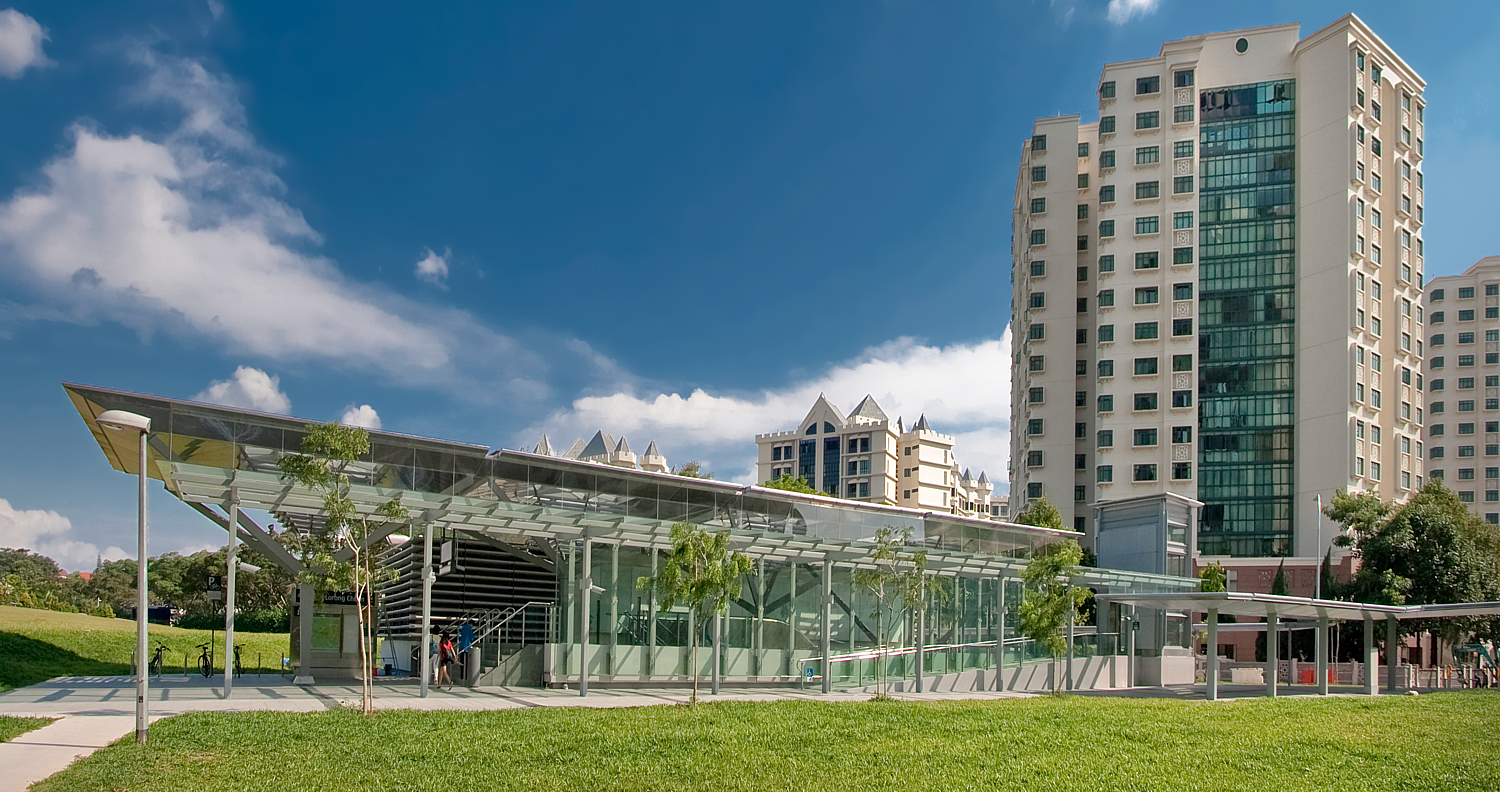
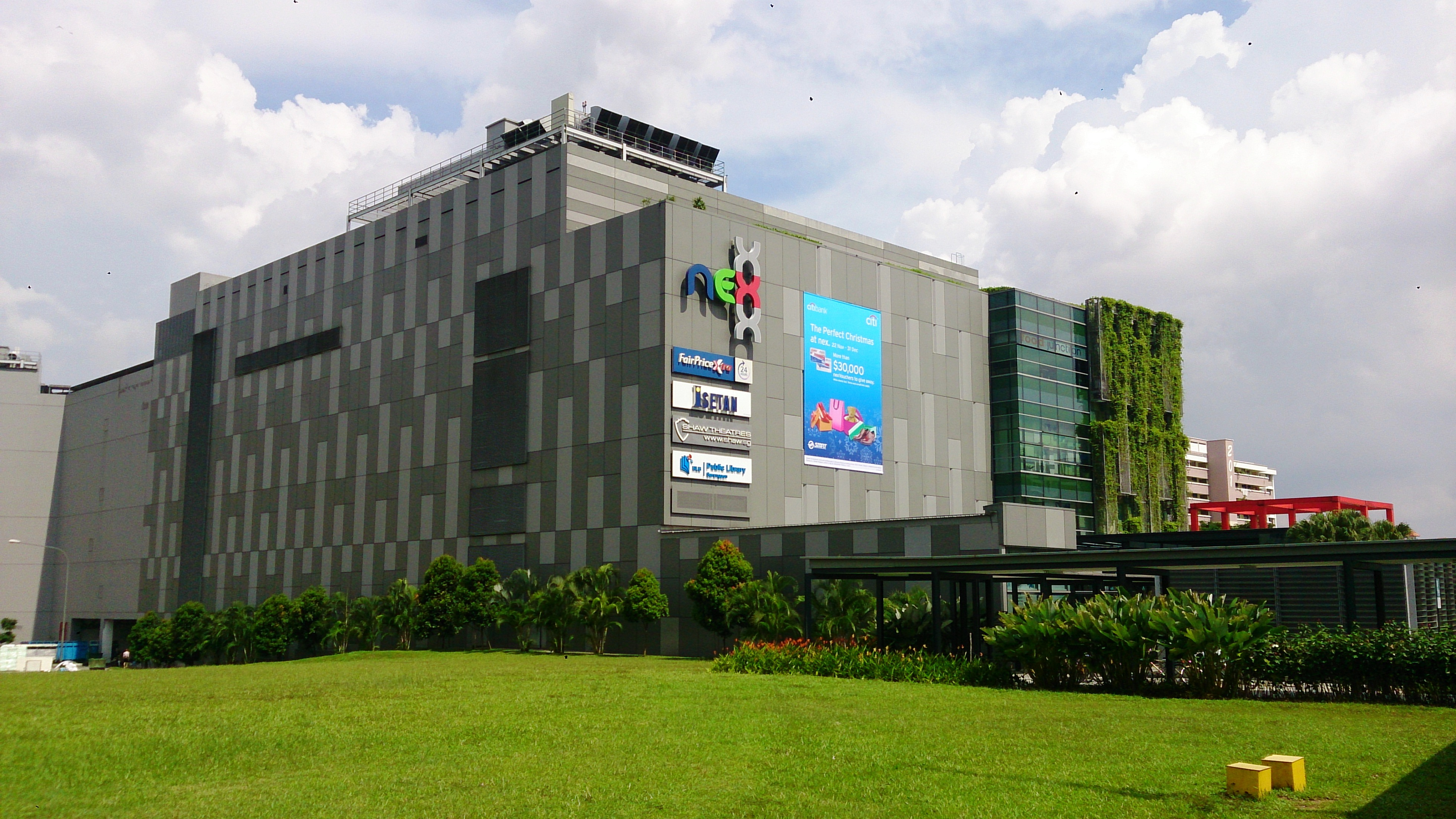
- From top left to right: Terraced housing in Serangoon, HDB flats in Serangoon North, Serangoon Viaduct, Lorong Chuan MRT station, Nex

- Location of Serangoon in Singapore

- Location of Serangoon within Singapore
- Coordinates: 01°21′49″N 103°52′03″E
- Country: Singapore
- Region: North-East Region
- CDCs: Central Singapore CDC; South East CDC
- Town councils: Ang Mo Kio Town Council; Aljunied-Hougang Town Council; Marine Parade Town Council
- Constituencies: Aljunied GRC; Ang Mo Kio GRC; Marine Parade–Braddell Heights GRC

Government
  - Mayors: Central Singapore CDC: Denise Phua; South East CDC: Dinesh Vasu Dash
  - Members of Parliament: Aljunied GRC: Kenneth Tiong; Ang Mo Kio GRC: Jasmin Lau; Marine Parade–Braddell Heights GRC: Seah Kian Peng

Area
  - Total: 10.1 km^{2} (3.9 sq mi)
  - Residential: 1.63 km^{2} (0.63 sq mi)

Population (2026)
  - Total: 115,270
  - Density: 11,400/km^{2} (29,600/sq mi)
- Postal districts: 19, 28
- Dwelling units: 21,293
- Projected ultimate: 30,000

Serangoon (IPA: /səˈræŋɡuːn/ sə-RANG-goon) is a planning area and residential town located in the North-East Region of Singapore.

Serangoon is bordered by these planning areas – Sengkang to the north, Hougang to the east, Ang Mo Kio and Bishan to the west, as well as Toa Payoh to the south. Serangoon planning area has a total of seven subzones: Serangoon Central, Lorong Chuan, Upper Paya Lebar, Serangoon Garden, Serangoon North, Seletar Hills and Serangoon North Industrial Estate.

== Etymology ==
There have been two possible origins for the name Serangoon. One origin comes from combining the Malay word "Ranggong" for a bird that was commonly seen around the Serangoon river, and the word "satu", which was then abbreviated to "sa", leading to "Saranggong". Alternatively, the name could have came from "di-serang dengan gong", a Malay phrase meaning "to surround with gongs", referring to the use of gongs to scare away animals from the forests of Serangoon.

== History ==
Serangoon was established some time in the mid 19th century, as a location for fruit, spice and rubber plantations. This would lead to several roads being named after fruits, like "Lorong Lew Lian" or "Lorong Ong Lye".

By 1828, Serangoon Road would be constructed, linking settlements in present day Little India with Serangoon Harbour.

In 1972, Chomp Chomp Food Centre was built to house hawkers in the area.

In 2003, the North East Line's Serangoon station was constructed.

== Amenities ==
=== Shopping Malls ===
- Nex
- myVillage

== Transportation ==
The original Serangoon bus interchange was opened on 13 March 1988 along Serangoon Central. It later relocated to nex on 3 September 2011.

=== Rail network ===
A large part of the North East Line on the Mass Rapid Transit (MRT) system runs parallel to Serangoon and Upper Serangoon Road, specifically the line between Little India and Kovan stations. Stations located in Serangoon include:

- CC12 Bartley
- NE12 CC13 Serangoon
- CC14 Lorong Chuan

Two stations on the Cross Island Line are also under construction, slated to be completed by 2030. The stations are:

- CR9 Serangoon North
- CR10 Tavistock

In addition, the under planning Seletar Line will serve the Serangoon North area, slated to open from the 2040s.

=== Road network ===
Upper Serangoon Road runs northeast from the junction with the Pan Island Expressway (PIE), MacPherson Road and Bendemeer Road. As part of the North East Line construction works, a road viaduct over Upper Serangoon Road was built from the junction with Braddell Road and Bartley Road, to just after the junction with Yio Chu Kang Road.

The Central Expressway (CTE) to the west provides a link to Seletar Airport, Toa Payoh and the Central Area.

== Education ==
As of 2026, this area has a total of 5 primary schools, 4 secondary schools and Nanyang Junior College.

=== Primary schools ===
- CHIJ Our Lady of Good Counsel
- Rosyth School
- St Gabriel's Primary School
- Yangzheng Primary School
- Zhonghua Primary School

=== Secondary schools ===
- Peicai Secondary School
- Serangoon Garden Secondary School
- St Gabriel's Secondary School
- Zhonghua Secondary School

=== Others ===
- Nanyang Junior College

== Politics ==
Serangoon have been served by three different MPs under three constituencies. Workers' Party MP Kenneth Tiong serves the namesake Serangoon division in Aljunied GRC, comprising Neighbourhoods 1 and 2 and the Serangoon Garden sub-district; Speaker of the Parliament Seah Kian Peng serves the Braddell Heights division in Marine Parade–Braddell Heights GRC, which administers Neighbourhoods 2, 3 and 4, Central Serangoon, and the sub-districts of Bartley and Lorong Chuan; Acting Cabinet Minister Jasmin Lau serves the Seletar–Serangoon division in Ang Mo Kio GRC which oversees Neighbourhood 5 and most of the western Serangoon.

== See also ==
- Serangoon North
- Serangoon Garden
- Nex

== Gallery ==
Panoramic view of the Serangoon and Bishan area, as seen from Ang Mo Kio

== Sources ==
- Victor R Savage, Brenda S A Yeoh (2003), Toponymics – A Study of Singapore Street Names, Eastern Universities Press, ISBN 981-210-205-1
