= Teck Ghee MRT station =

Future Mass Rapid Transit station in Singapore

Teck Ghee CR12 德义 டெக் கீ
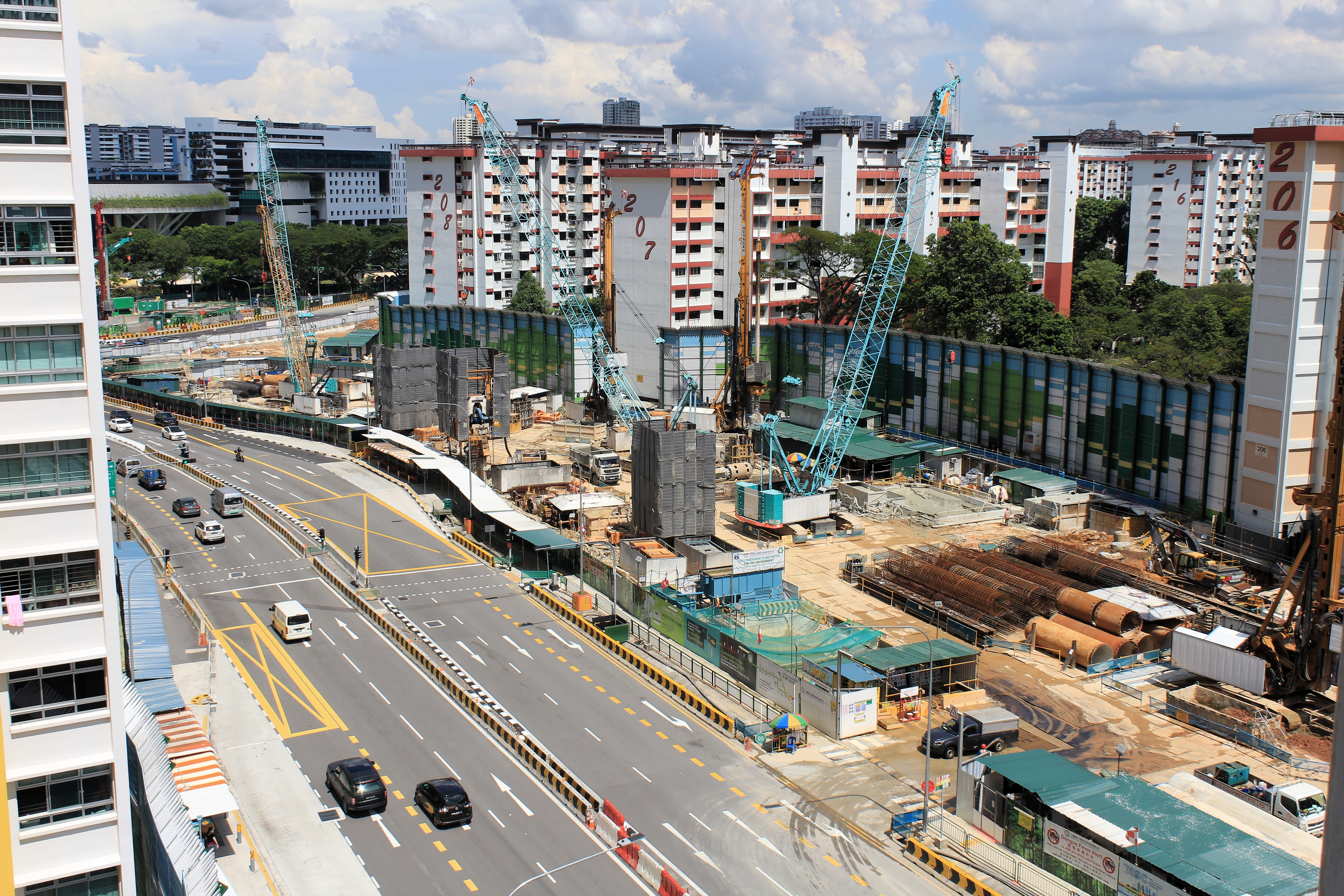
- Teck Ghee MRT station site

General information
- Location: 3500 Ang Mo Kio Avenue 6, Singapore 569909
- Coordinates: 01°21′56″N 103°50′37″E
- System: Future Mass Rapid Transit (MRT) station
- Owner: Land Transport Authority
- Line: Cross Island Line
- Platforms: 2 (1 island platform)
- Tracks: 2
- Connections: Bus, Taxi

Construction
- Structure type: Underground
- Accessible: Yes

Other information
- Station code: TGE

History
- Opening: 2030; 4 years' time

Services
Preceding station	Mass Rapid Transit	Following station
Ang Mo Kio towards Aviation Park	Cross Island Line Future service	Bright Hill Terminus
Location
- Location within Singapore Rail

Teck Ghee MRT station is a future underground Mass Rapid Transit station on the Cross Island Line located on the boundary of Ang Mo Kio and Bishan planning areas, Singapore. It will be located underneath Ang Mo Kio Avenue 6, between the junctions of Ang Mo Kio Street 31 and Ang Mo Kio Avenue 1.

The station is in the vicinity of residential estates in Ang Mo Kio and Bishan North, and community amenities such as Bishan–Ang Mo Kio Park and Ang Mo Kio Secondary School.

== History ==
On 25 January 2019, LTA announced that Teck Ghee station would be part of the proposed Cross Island Line (CRL). The station will be constructed as part of Phase 1, consisting of 12 stations between Aviation Park and Bright Hill, and is expected to be completed in 2030.

Contract N109A, which encompasses the design and construction of Teck Ghee station box, was awarded to Shanghai Tunnel Engineering Co (Singapore) at a sum of S$615.9 million in January 2019. The contract also includes the design and construction of a section of the North South Corridor tunnel between Sin Ming Avenue and Ang Mo Kio Avenue 3, and relevant commuter facilities. As Teck Ghee station will be superimposed with the North South Corridor and surface road, the station box will be constructed initially, and a subsequent contract will be awarded to complete the station.

Initially expected to open in 2029, the restrictions on construction works due to the COVID-19 pandemic led to a delay of the opening to 2030.
