= Australian International School Singapore =

Location
- 1 Lorong Chuan; Singapore 556818; Singapore; 1°20.740′N 103°51.630′E

Information
- School type: Private international school
- Established: 1993; 33 years ago
- Founder: Coral Dixon
- School district: Singapore
- Oversight: Cognita
- Head of school: Steve Lupton
- Gender: mixed
- Age range: 18 months - 18 years
- Enrolment: 2,500; Over 50 nationalities, with 50% from Australia and New Zealand
- Average class size: 25
- Classes offered: Pre-school; K-12
- Hours in school day: 7
- Campus: Urban
- Campus size: 1,000–1,300 square metres (11,000–14,000 sq ft)
- Houses: Lachan (Devils), Derwent (Storm), Murray (Lions) and Fitzroy (Dragons)
- Song: Reach for the stars
- Mascot: AIS Sharks
- Nickname: AIS
- Accreditations: IGCSE; International Baccalaureate World School; NSW HSC; Australian Curriculum; Western Association of Schools and Colleges,(WASC)
- Affiliations: International Baccalaureate Organization; NSW Board of Studies, Teaching and Educational Standards; Council of International Schools; University of Cambridge IGCSE; Association of International Schools; Western Association of Schools and Colleges,(WASC); EduTrust Singapore
- Website: https://www.ais.com.sg/

The Australian International School (AIS), located in Singapore, is a co-educational international school that offers a combination of the International Baccalaureate (IB), International General Certificate of Secondary Education (IGCSE), and Australian curricula. The school provides two diploma options for senior students: the International Baccalaureate Diploma Programme (IBDP) and the Higher School Certificate (HSC). The school caters to students from 18 months old through to Year 12 across three sub-schools.

All three sub-schools are located on a single campus at 1 Lorong Chuan, Singapore. The campus, which spans over one kilometre in length, is situated near the Lorong Chuan MRT station and is accessible by foot, bus, or car.

== Notable former pupils ==
- Tippah Dwan, netball player
- Callina Liang, actress
- Troy Hunt, web security consultant
- Tunku Ismail Idris, Crown Prince of Johor
