= Tavistock MRT station =

Future Mass Rapid Transit station in Singapore

Tavistock CR10 达维士笃 தெவிஸ்தொக்
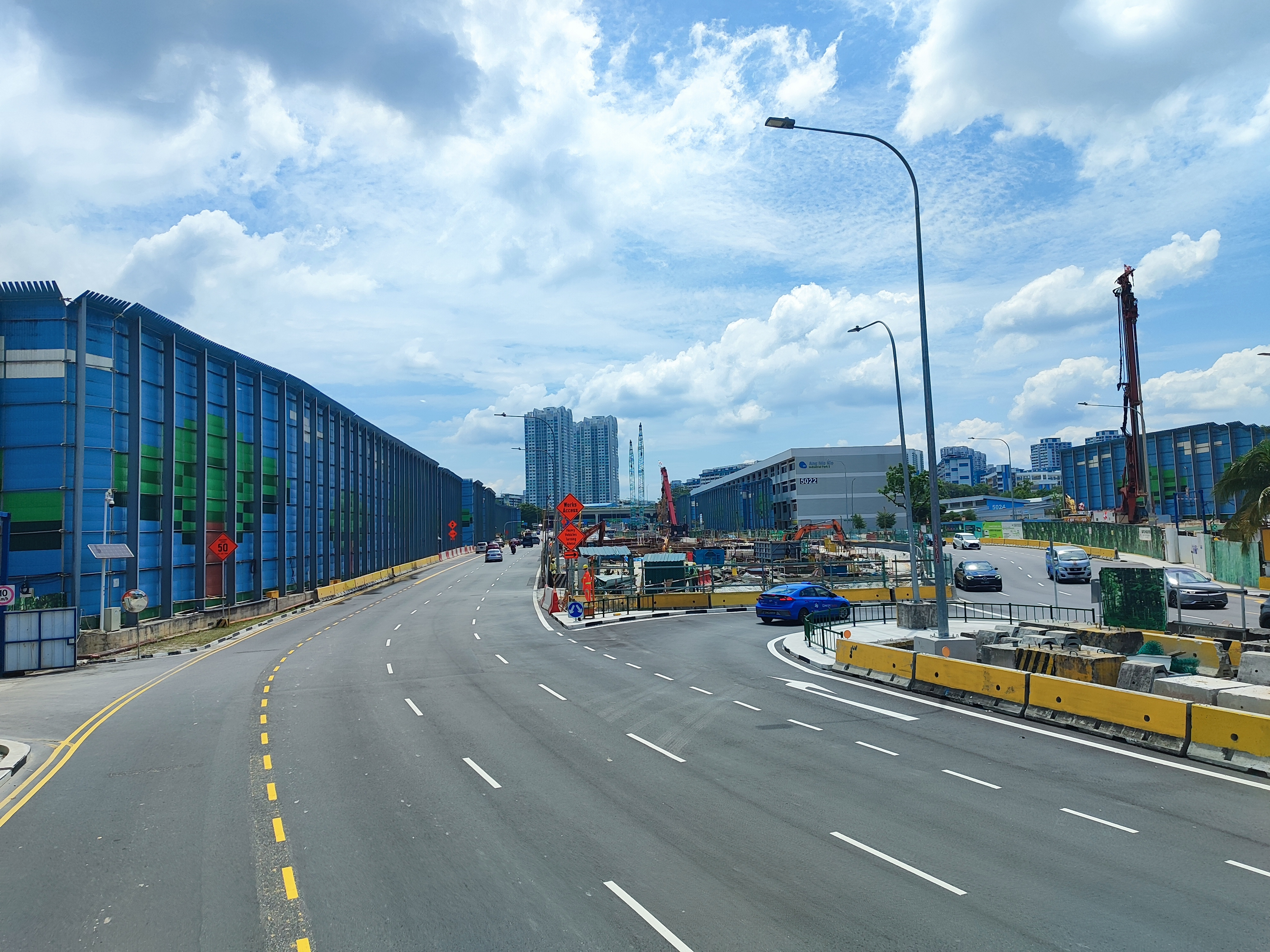
- Tavistock MRT station site

General information
- Coordinates: 01°22′12″N 103°51′48″E
- System: Future Mass Rapid Transit (MRT) station
- Owner: Land Transport Authority
- Line: Cross Island Line
- Platforms: 2 (1 island platform)
- Tracks: 2
- Connections: Bus, Taxi

Construction
- Structure type: Underground
- Accessible: Yes

Other information
- Station code: TVK

History
- Opening: 2030; 4 years' time

Services
Preceding station	Mass Rapid Transit	Following station
Serangoon North towards Aviation Park	Cross Island Line Future service	Ang Mo Kio towards Bright Hill
Location
- Location within Singapore Rail

Tavistock MRT station is a future underground Mass Rapid Transit station on the Cross Island Line located in Serangoon planning area, Singapore.

It will be located underneath Ang Mo Kio Avenue 3, at the junction of Tavistock Avenue and Ang Mo Kio Industrial Park 2 as well as being in the vicinity of industries at Ang Mo Kio Industrial Park 2, residential developments around Tavistock, and community amenities such as Chen Su Lan Methodist Children's Home, Ling Kwang Home, Cheshire Home, Serangoon Gardens Food Centre and the French School of Singapore (Lycée Français de Singapour).

== History ==
On 25 January 2019, the Land Transport Authority (LTA) announced that Tavistock station would be part of the proposed Cross Island Line (CRL). The station will be constructed as part of Phase 1, which will consist of 12 stations from the Aviation Park to Bright Hill stations. It was expected to be completed in 2029. However, the restrictions imposed on construction works due to the COVID-19 pandemic led to delays and the CRL1 completion date was pushed by one year to 2030. A second stage from Bright Hill to Jurong Lake District stations is targeted to open in 2032.

On 13 January 2022, the LTA awarded Contract CR115 to Sato Kogyo (S) at S$407 million (US$298.3 million). The contract involves the design and construction of the station and associated tunnels. Construction works for the station and tunnels are scheduled to begin in the first quarter of 2022, and expected to be completed by 2030. Due to the station's location in a built-up area, the launch shaft for the tunnel boring machine will be at a distance from the station site. Tunnelling through old alluvium soil, the boring machine has to be closely monitored for wear and tear.
