= Zhonghua Secondary School =

- 中华中学; Sekolah Menengah Zhonghua

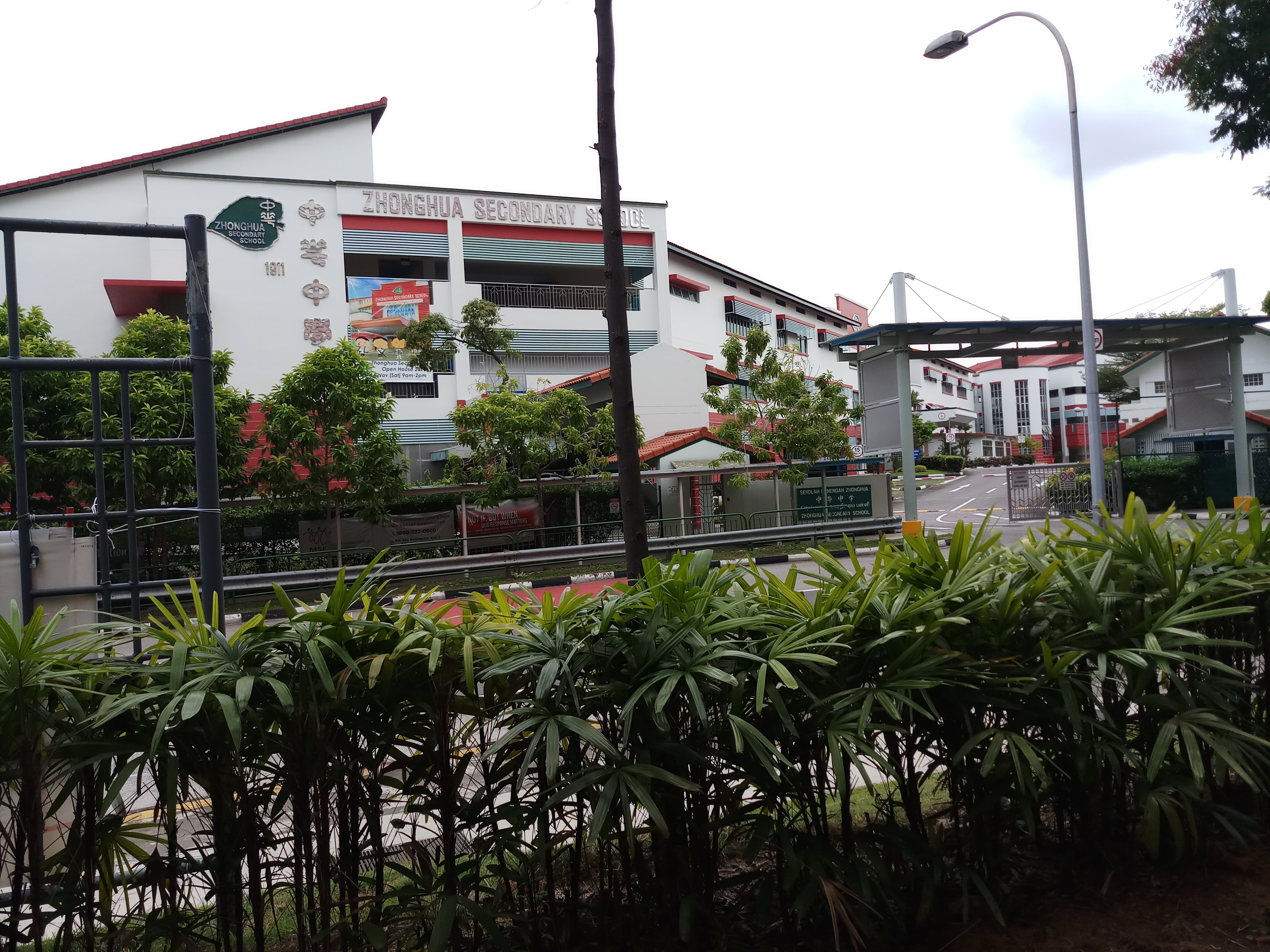

Location
- 13 Serangoon Avenue 3 Serangoon, 556123; Singapore; 1.3494°N 103.8693°E

Information
- Type: Autonomous
- Motto: 禮義廉恥 (Courteous, Righteous, Edified, Dignified)
- Established: 1911
- Session: Single-Session
- School code: 3240
- Principal: Tan Kim Koon
- Gender: Co-educational
- Enrolment: approx. 1,200
- Colour: Green White
- Website: www.zhonghuasec.moe.edu.sg

Zhonghua Secondary School (ZHSS) is a co-educational government autonomous secondary school in Serangoon, Singapore. Zhonghua Secondary School was founded in 1911 as Chung Hwa Girls' High School. It became aco-educational institution in 1984. The school has retained its Chinese heritage, despite transforming into an English-medium government school in 1990.

== History ==
=== Chung Hwa Girls' High School (1911 - 1984) ===
Zhonghua Secondary School was established on 15 September 1911 as a Chinese-medium girls' school in response to Sun Yat-sen's suggestion for schools to be established for girls. It was the first Chinese-medium girls' school in Singapore, founded by Tay Peng Teng, Puan Yeow Pong and the Chinese community. The school initially operated at the site at Mohamad Sultan Road.

In 1925, it moved to Niven Road and was formally named Chung Hwa Girls' School, providing both elementary and high school education. Lessons were disrupted with the Japanese occupation of Singapore in 1942. In the initial years of resuming education, lessons for high school section were conducted at Nan Chiau Girls' High School in River Valley for between 1947 and early 1951 as a deliberate measure to ease overpopulation. In 1951, the high school section was separated from the elementary school section to cope with increased enrolment, and was renamed as Chung Hwa Girls' High School. A new campus along Bartley Road was officially launched in the same year. The school became government-aided in 1957.

In 1978, Chung Hwa Girls' High was initially included in the list of 12 newly accorded Special Assistance Plan schools. However, Chung Hwa Girls' High School was dropped from the list with the amendments made by the Ministry of Education over the surplus of school places, which left the scheme to proceed with only nine schools.

Chung Hwa Girls' High School faced a massive decline in enrolment towards the end of the 1970s, as English-medium integrated schools gained prevalence. In 1980, English-medium classes were introduced. A deliberate decision was made to allow enrolment of male students from January 1984 and to incorporate into a government school, which transferred the supervision of all aspects of the institution to the state. Following the changes, the school was renamed as "Chung Hwa High School".

=== Transitioning into a modern institution ===
In 1987, the school moved to Serangoon New Town along Serangoon Avenue 4 and was formally renamed as Zhonghua Secondary School to reflect its status as a government school. Zhonghua Secondary School was accorded autonomous status in 1996. In December 1999, the school commenced operation at a new school complex along Serangoon Avenue 3 costing an estimated S$23 million. In August 2005, the Centre for Excellence (COE) for Visual Arts is opened in the school. A multi-purpose sports complex was added to the campus in 2008.

== Identity and culture ==
=== Crest ===
The crest of Zhonghua Secondary School underwent changes after the change from a girls' school to a co-educational school in 1984, and a subsequent rename in 1987. The full name of the school originally superimposed on the crest was dropped, using instead the shortened name of the school. The English name of the school was added to the crest since 1987. The current crest features the name of the school written in Traditional Chinese characters over a begonia leaf background. The colour green signifies freshness, youth, growth, life, vitality and resilience. The colour white is the emblem of purity, virtue and brightness. Students are encouraged to represent qualities of the Begonia leaf, in particular - to be steadfast, strong, determined and decisive. Students are also encouraged to cultivate qualities such as excellence, endurance, hope and goodness. The shape of the leaf resembles the geographical features of mainland China, which reflects the heritage of the school as an institution set up by Chinese nationalists during the revolution period.

=== Uniform ===
The uniform of Zhonghua Secondary School was a modified and modernised variation of its original uniform. Formerly, girls wore white shirts with below-the-knee pleated skirts while boys wore a full white uniform, with the metal school badge pinned on at the left chest level. The uniform was redesigned in 2002 following strong advocations by the student body, with major changes to the girl's uniform.

Currently, girls wear white shirts with the school logo sewn at the left chest level, complemented by a green skirt. The full white uniform for boys was retained, featuring a white shirt with white shorts for lower secondary levels and white long pants for upper secondary levels.

== Academic information ==
Being a government secondary school, Zhonghua Secondary School offers three academic streams, namely the four-year Express course, as well as the Normal Course, comprising Normal (Academic) and Normal (Technical) academic tracks.

=== O Level Express Course ===
The Express Course is a nationwide four-year programme that leads up to the Singapore-Cambridge GCE Ordinary Level examination.

=== Normal Course ===
The Normal Course is a nationwide 4-year programme leading to the Singapore-Cambridge GCE Normal Level examination, which runs either the Normal (Academic) curriculum or Normal (Technical) curriculum, abbreviated as N(A) and N(T) respectively.

==== Normal (Academic) Course ====
A 5th year leading to the Singapore-Cambridge GCE Ordinary Level examination is available to N(A) students who perform well in their Singapore-Cambridge GCE Normal Level examination. Students can move from one course to another based on their performance and the assessment of the school principal and teachers.

==== Normal (Technical) Course ====
The Normal (Technical) course prepares students for a technical-vocational education at the Institute of Technical Education. Students will offer 5-7 subjects in the Singapore-Cambridge GCE Normal Level examination. The curriculum is tailored towards strengthening students' proficiency in English and Mathematics. Students take English Language, Mathematics, Basic Mother Tongue and Computer Applications as compulsory subjects.

== Notable alumni ==
- Royston Tan: Film director
- Amos Yee: Singaporean sex offender and former child actor
- Lee Yi Peng: Eldest son of third and former prime minister of Singapore, Lee Hsien Loong.
