= Serangoon North MRT station =

Future Mass Rapid Transit station in Singapore

Serangoon North CR9 实龙岗北 சிராங்கூன் நார்த்
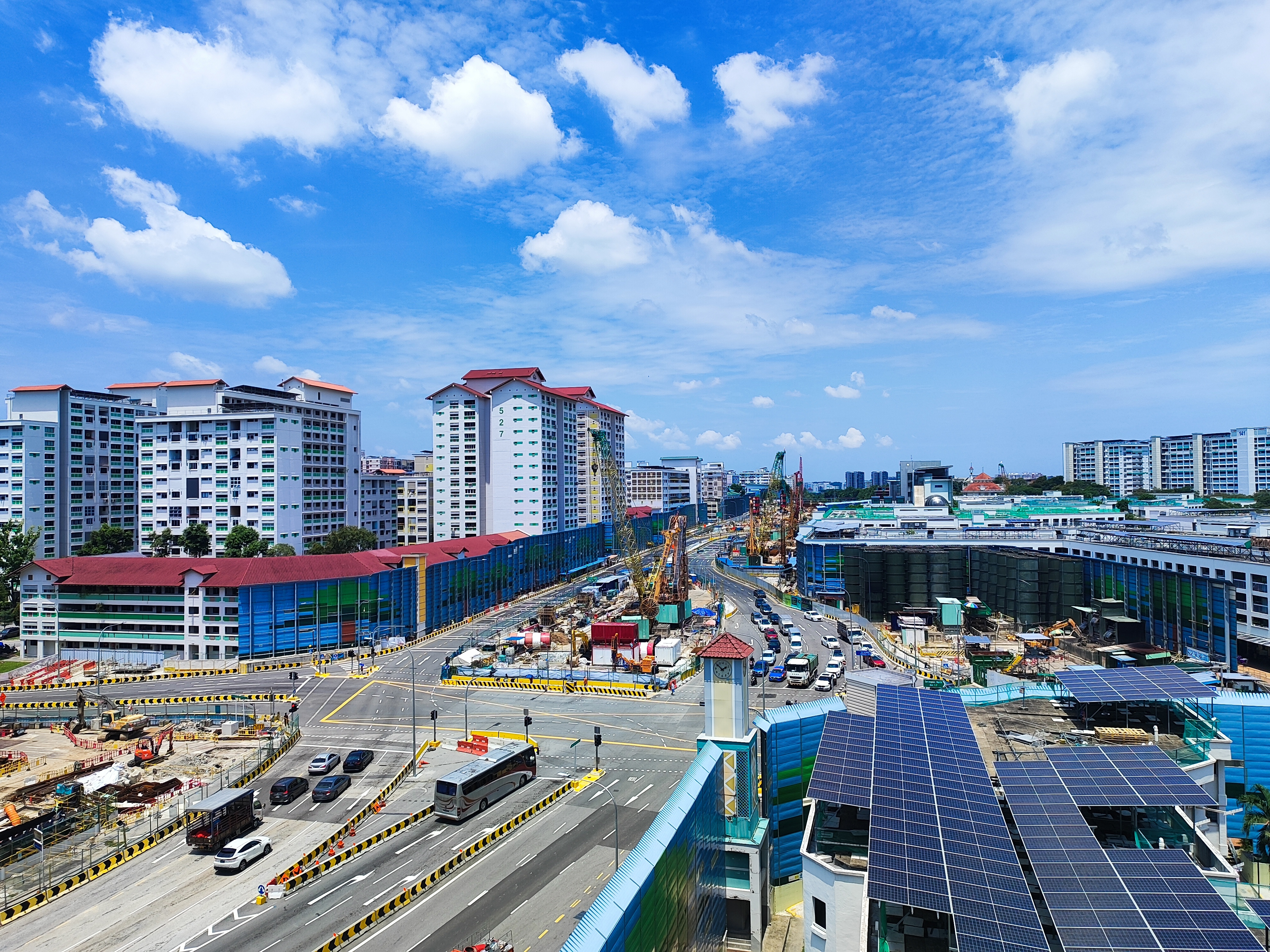
- Serangoon North MRT station site in September 2025

General information
- Coordinates: 01°22′14″N 103°52′25″E
- System: Future Mass Rapid Transit (MRT) station
- Owner: Land Transport Authority
- Line: Cross Island Line
- Platforms: 2 (2 side platforms)
- Tracks: 3 (Including 1 siding)
- Connections: Bus, Taxi

Construction
- Structure type: Underground
- Accessible: Yes

Other information
- Station code: SRN

History
- Opening: 2030; 4 years' time

Services
Preceding station	Mass Rapid Transit	Following station
Hougang towards Aviation Park	Cross Island Line Future service	Tavistock towards Bright Hill
Track layout
Location
- Location within Singapore Rail

Serangoon North MRT station is a future underground Mass Rapid Transit station on the Cross Island Line located on the boundary of Serangoon and Hougang planning areas, Singapore. It will be located underneath Ang Mo Kio Avenue 3, at the junctions of Serangoon North Avenue 1 and Serangoon North Avenue 3.

The station is in the vicinity of residential developments near Serangoon North, and community amenities such as The Serangoon Community Club, Hwi Yoh Community Centre, Rosyth School, Serangoon Garden Secondary School, Bowen Secondary School and various other places of worship such as Al-Istiqamah Mosque.

== History ==
On 25 January 2019, the Land Transport Authority (LTA) announced that Serangoon North station would be part of the proposed Cross Island Line (CRL). The station will be constructed as part of Phase 1, which will consist of 12 stations from the Aviation Park to Bright Hill stations. It was expected to be completed in 2029. However, the restrictions imposed on construction works due to the COVID-19 pandemic led to delays and the CRL1 completion date was pushed by one year to 2030.

On 13 January 2022, the LTA awarded Contract CR113 to Hock Lian Seng Infrastructure Pte. Ltd. at S$407 million (US$332.8 million). The contract involves the design and construction of the station and associated tunnels. The station will have an additional track for the withdrawal or parking of trains. Construction works for the station and tunnels are scheduled to begin in the first quarter of 2022, and are expected to be completed by 2030. The station is located near the vehicular interchange of Ang Mo Kio Avenue 3 and Yio Chu Kang Road, which had to be diverted through various phases to facilitate construction works. An underpass going under Yio Chu Kang Road will be mined instead of the cut-and-cover method, to minimise vehicular traffic at the Yio Chu Kang Road vehicular bridge.
