= Tampines =

- Planning area and regional centre

Other transcription(s)
  - Chinese: 淡滨尼 (Simplified) 淡濱尼 (Traditional); Dànbīnní (Pinyin) (pronounced [tân.pín.nǐ]); Tām-pin-nî (Hokkien POJ); Tăm-ping-nî (Teochew PUJ); Taam^{5} Ban^{1} Nei^{4} (Cantonese Jyutping)
  - Malay: Tampines / Tempinis (Rumi) تمڤينيس (Jawi)
  - Tamil: தெம்பினிஸ் / தெம்பனிஸ் Tempiṉis / Tempaṉis (Transliteration)
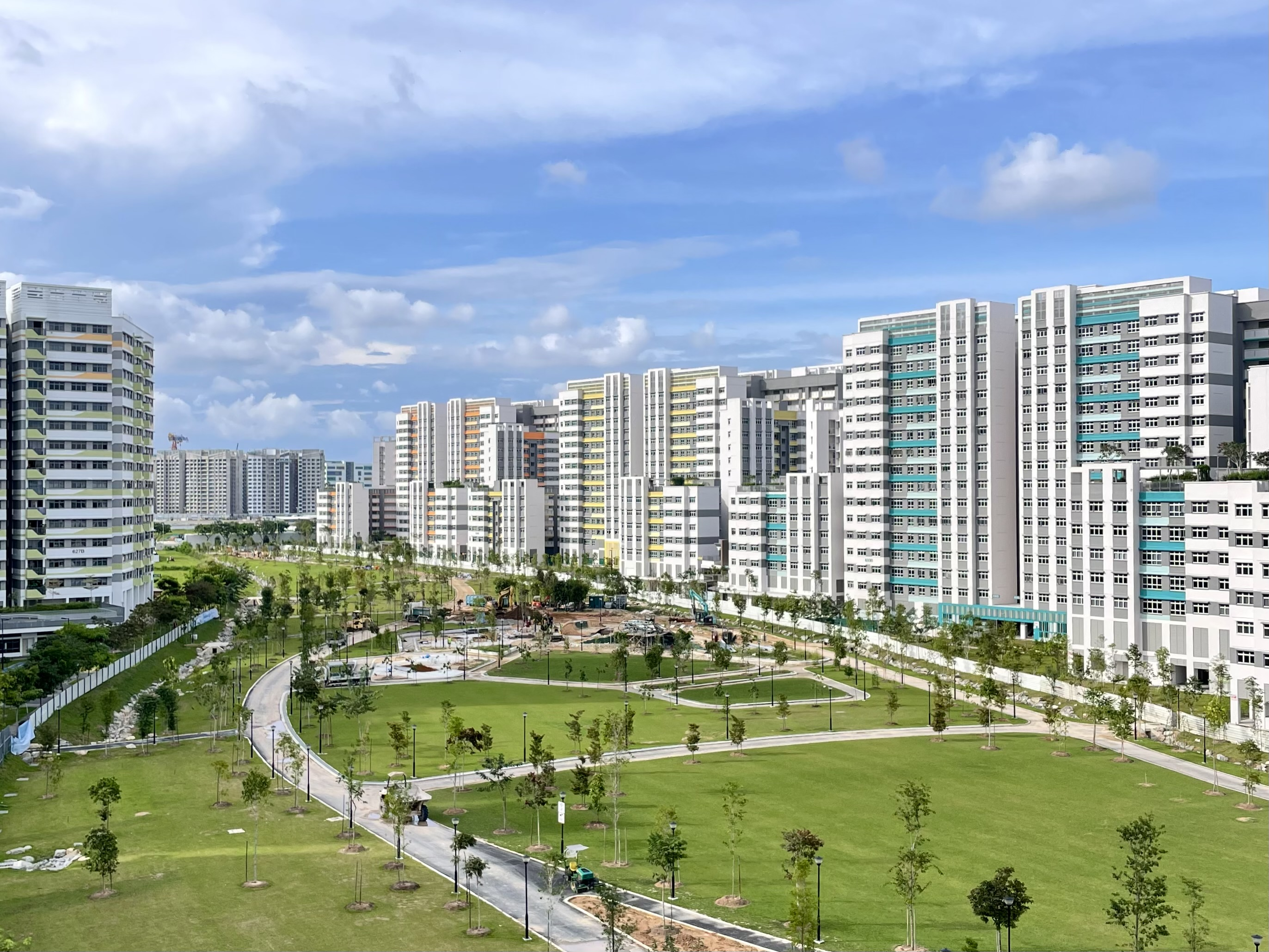
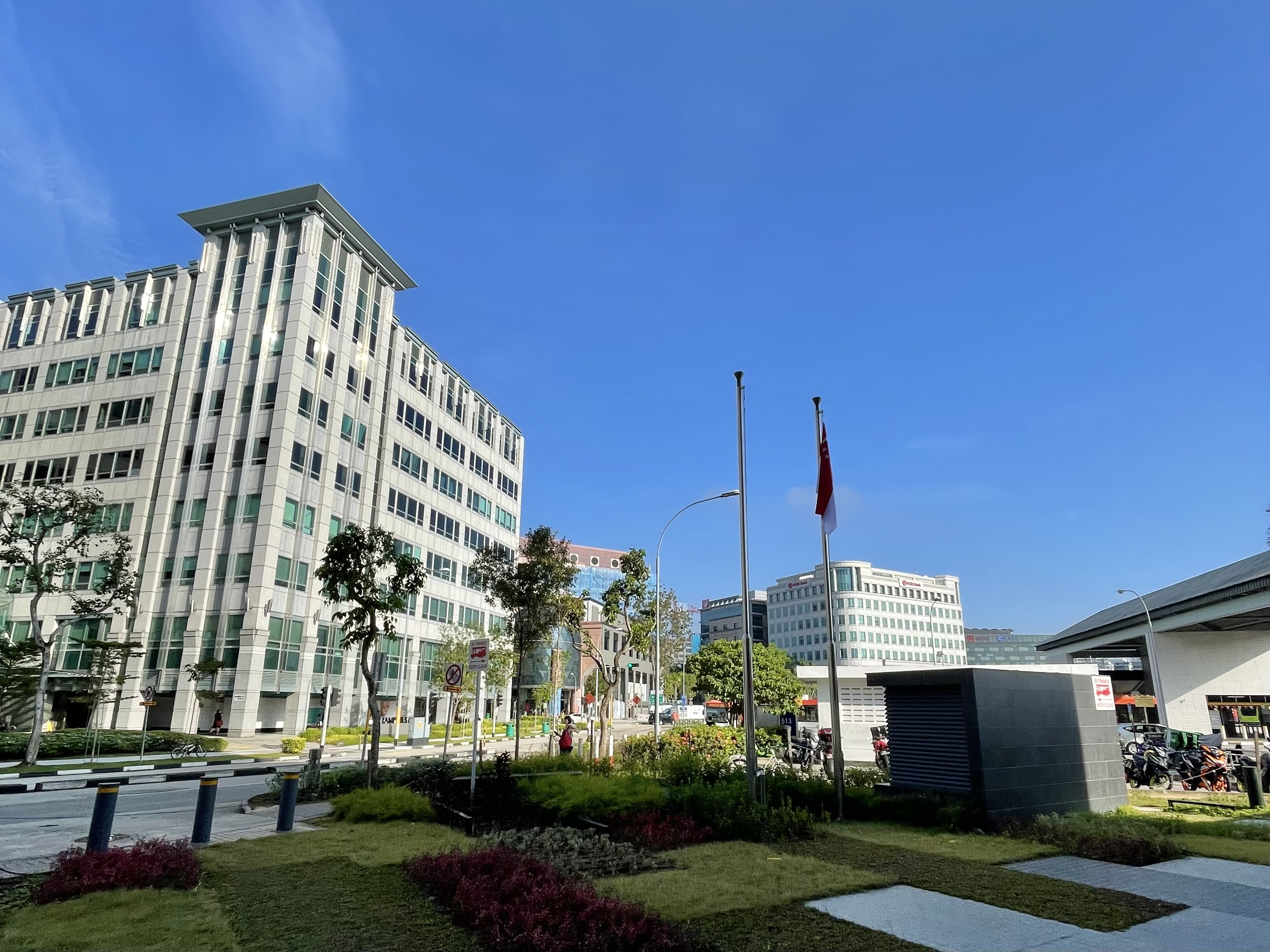
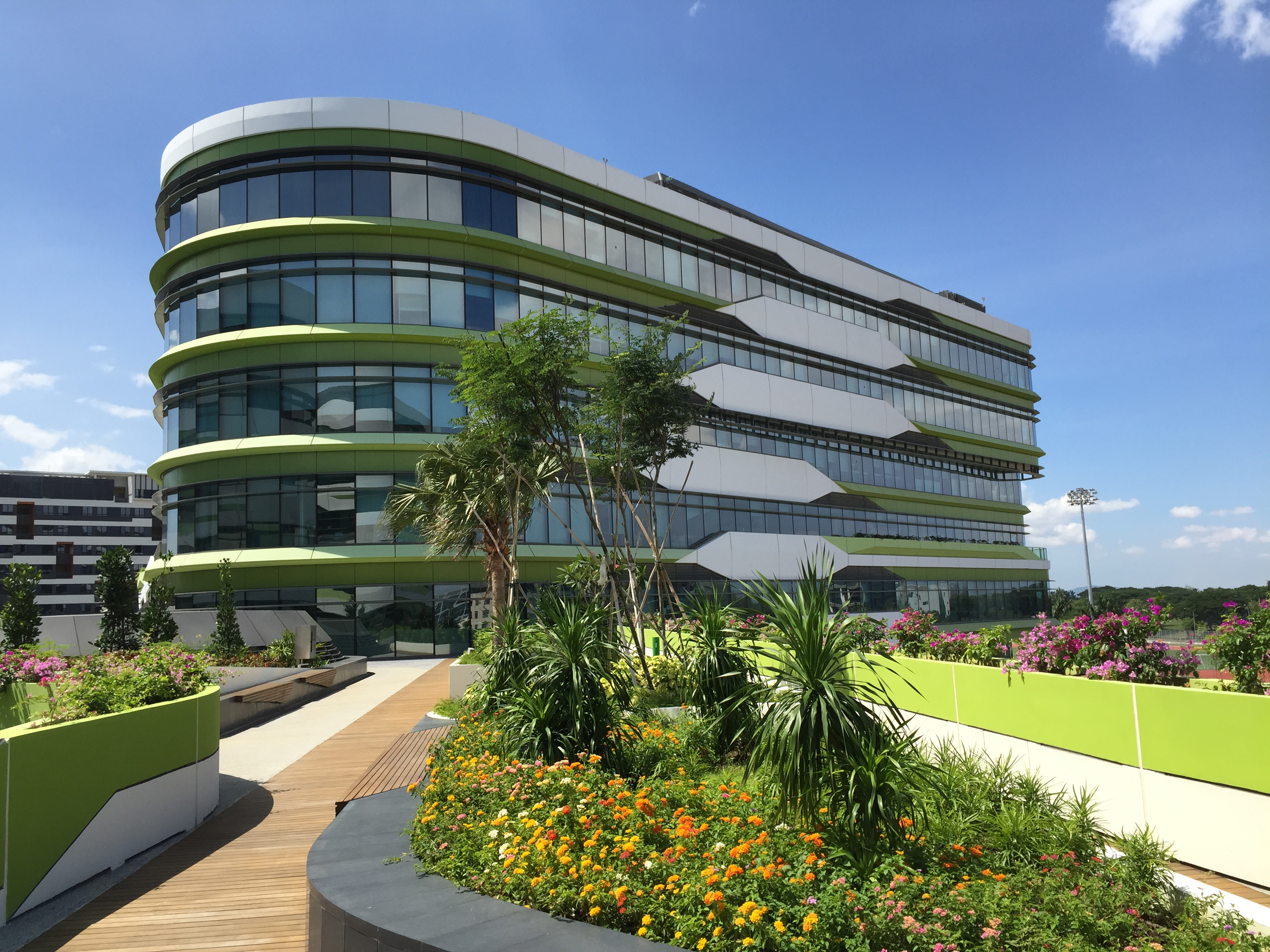
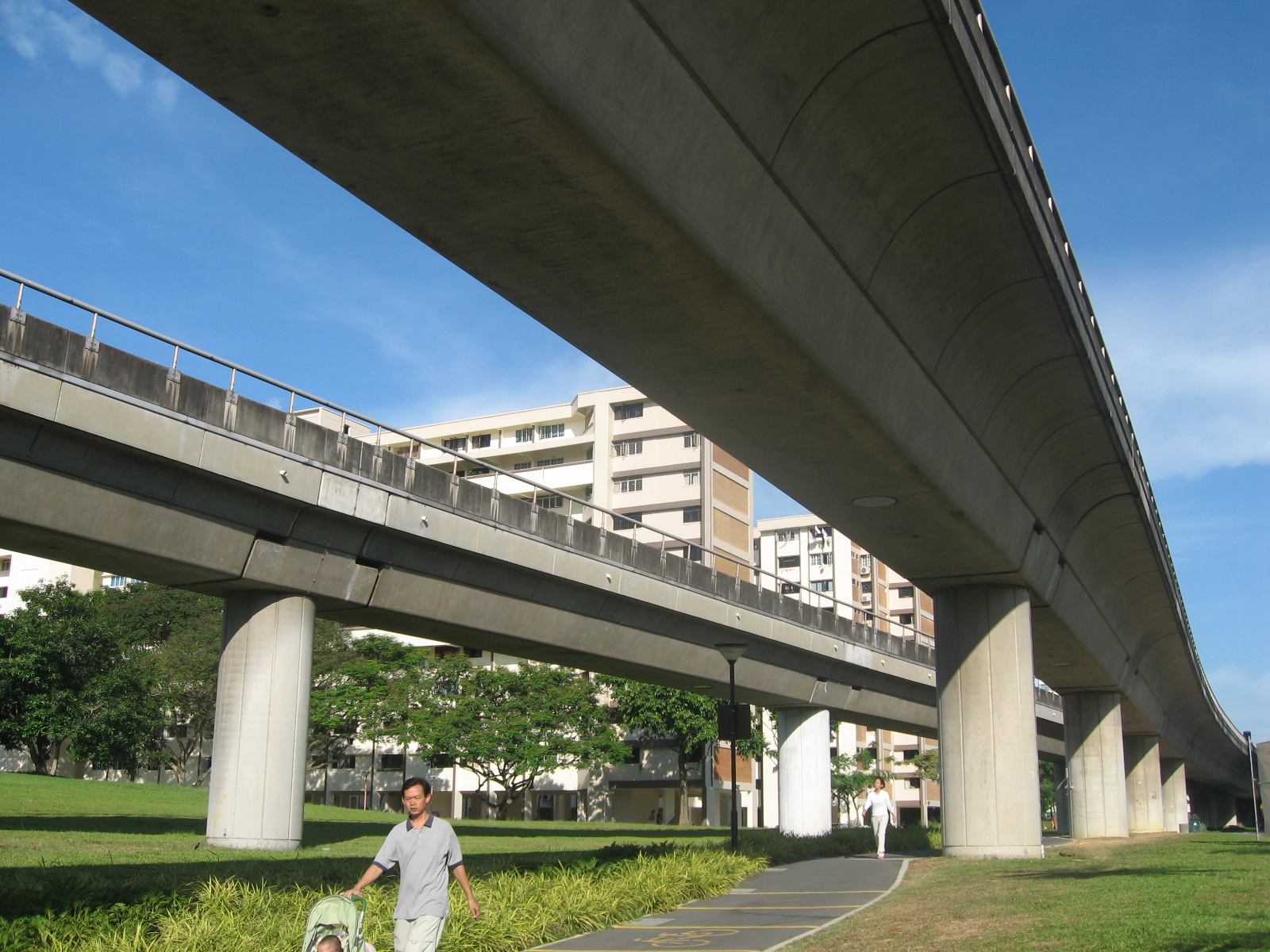
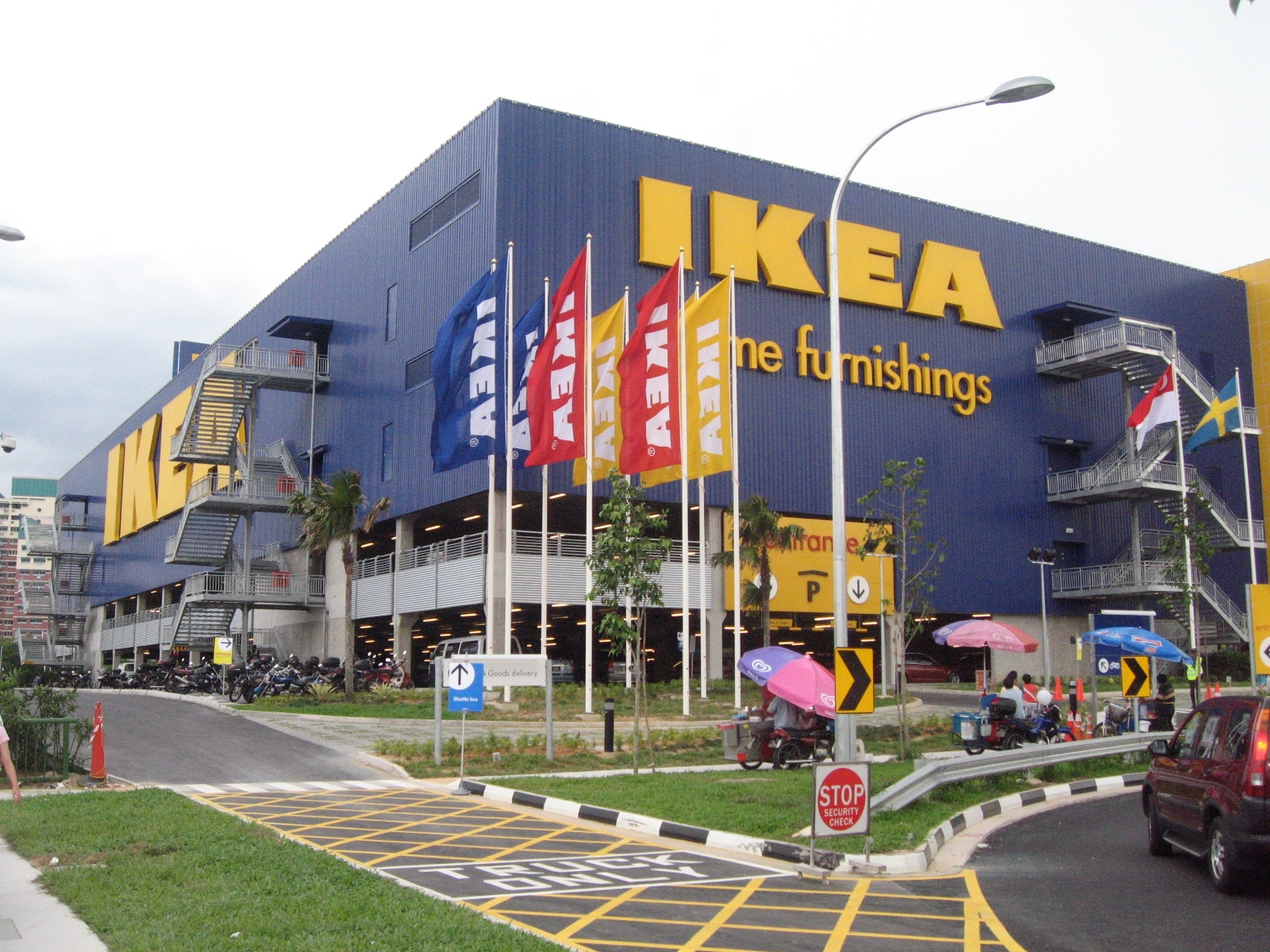
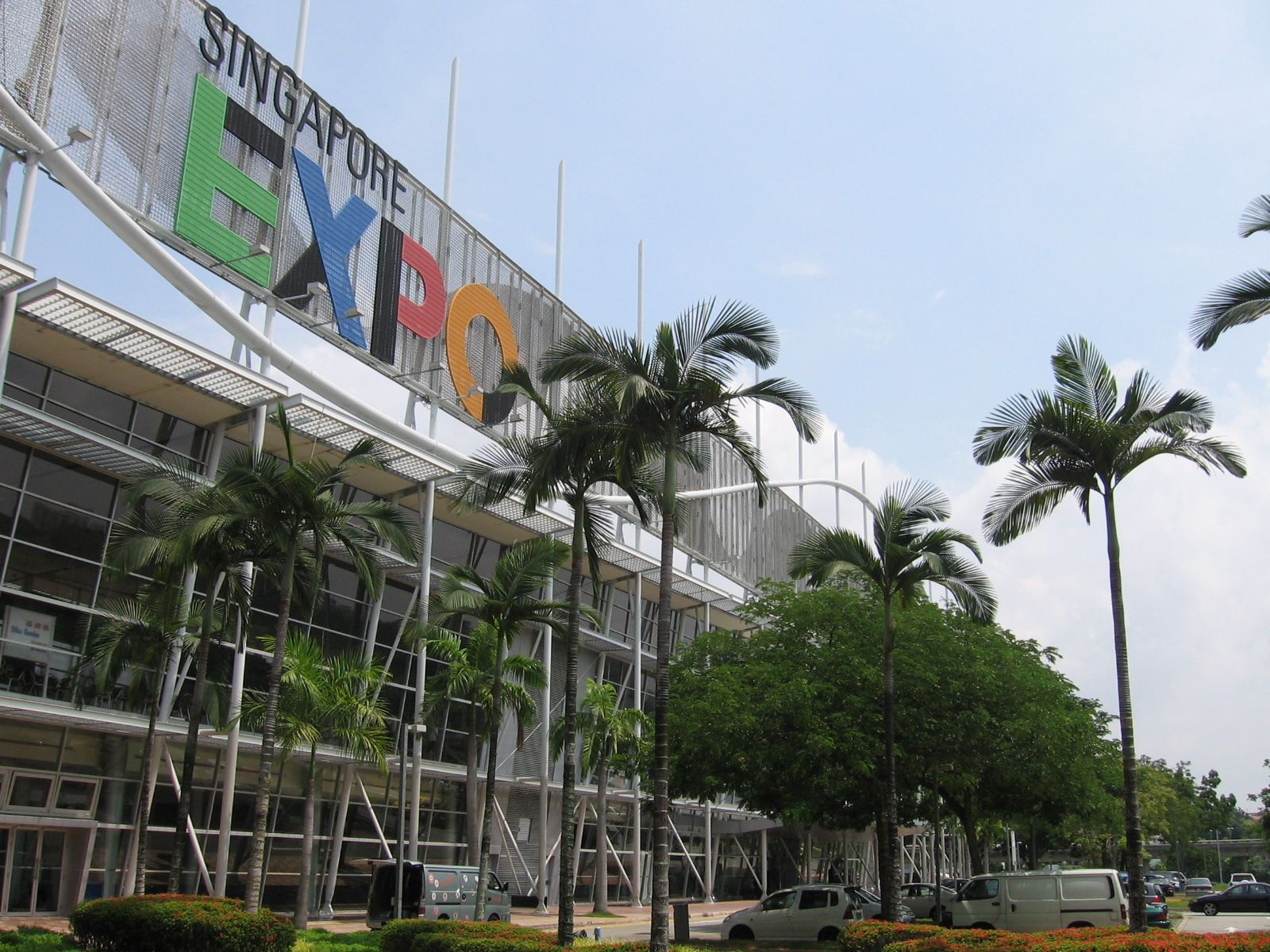
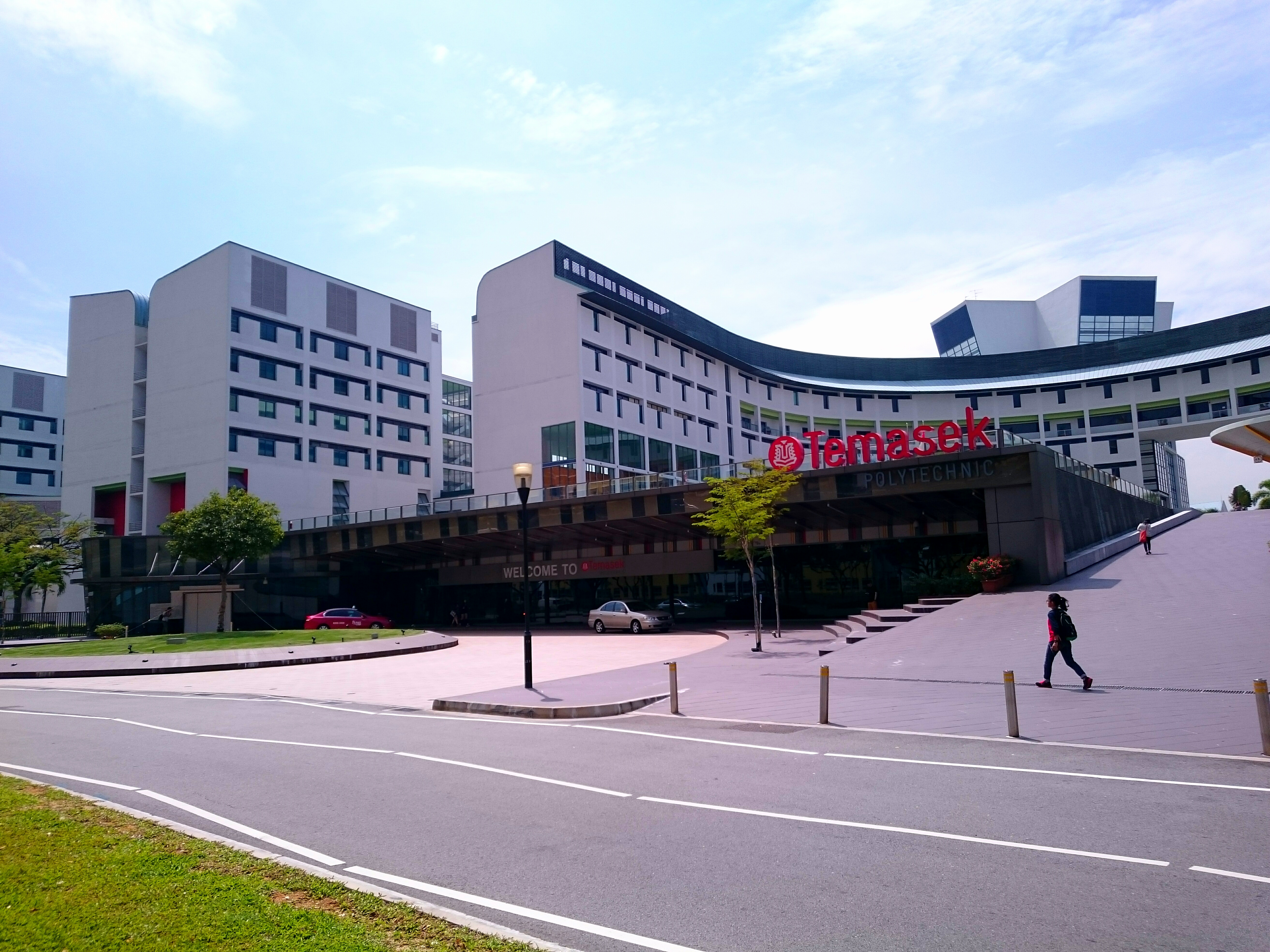
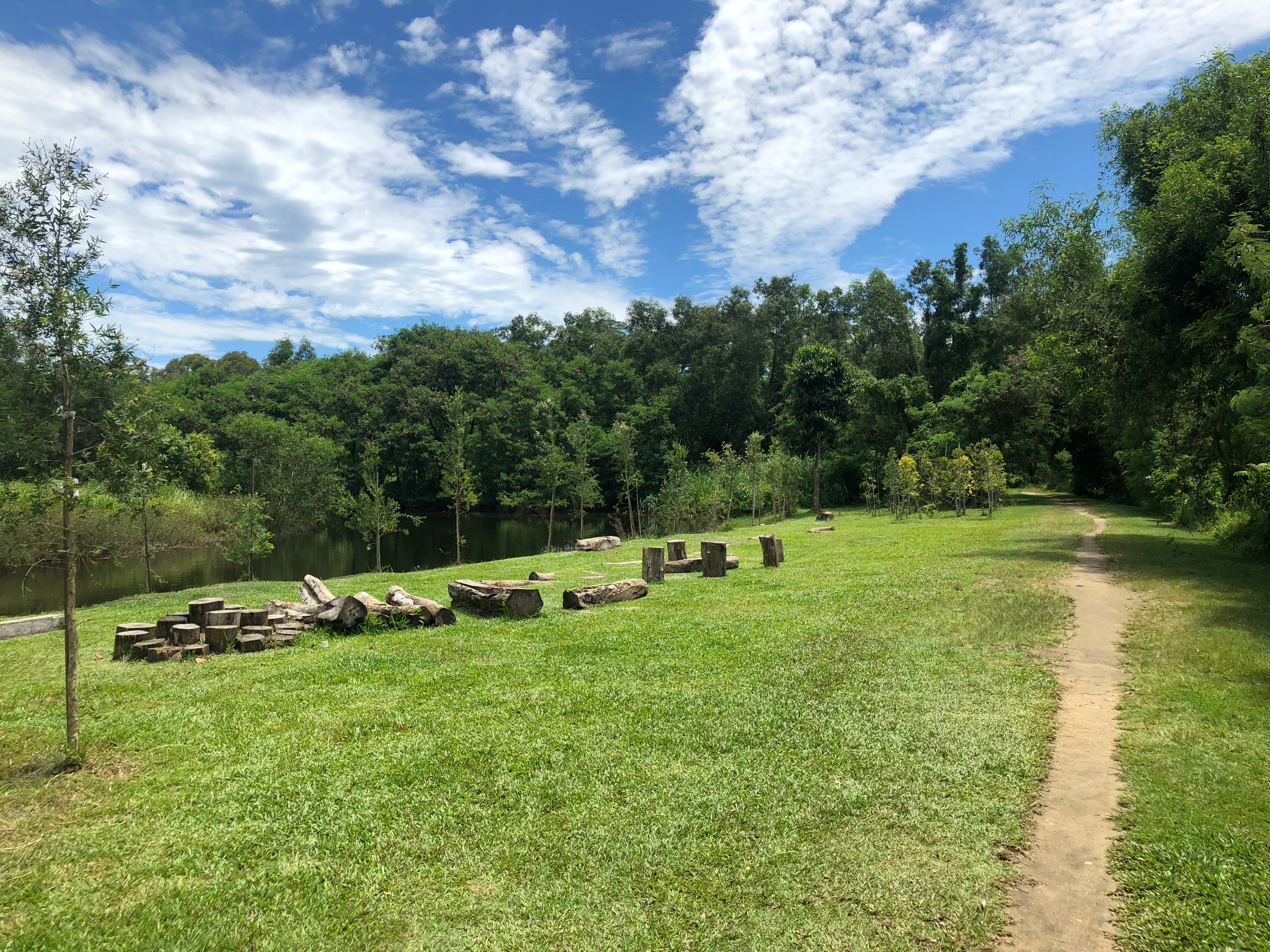
- Clockwise from top: Public housing in Tampines North, Singapore University of Technology and Design, IKEA megastore at Tampines Retail Park, Tampines Eco Green, Temasek Polytechnic, Singapore Expo, East–West Line viaduct, Commercial buildings in Tampines Central

- Location of Tampines in Singapore

- Location within Singapore Location within Southeast Asia
- Coordinates: 1°20′58.53″N 103°57′24.44″E
- Country: Singapore
- Region: East Region
- CDCs: North East; South East
- Town Councils: East Coast; Tampines
- Constituencies: East Coast GRC; Tampines GRC; Tampines Changkat SMC

Government
  - Mayors: North East CDC: Baey Yam Keng; South East CDC: Dinesh Vasu Dash
  - Members of Parliament: East Coast GRC: Jessica Tan; Tampines GRC: Baey Yam Keng; Charlene Chen; David Neo; Koh Poh Koon; Masagos Zulkifli; Tampines Changkat SMC: Desmond Choo

Area
  - Total: 20.80 km^{2} (8.03 sq mi)
  - Residential: 5.49 km^{2} (2.12 sq mi)

Population (2026)
  - Total: 296,060
  - Rank: 1st in Singapore
  - Density: 14,230/km^{2} (36,860/sq mi)
- Postal district: 16, 18
- Dwelling units: 73,968
- Projected ultimate: 110,000

Tampines (IPA: /ˈtæmpəniːs, -ɪn-/ TAM-pə-nees or TAM-pin-ees) is the regional centre of the East Region of Singapore. With a population of 290,090 across five subzones as of 2025, it is the most populous planning area in Singapore. Tampines is bordered by Bedok and Paya Lebar to the west, Pasir Ris to the north, Changi to the east, and the Straits of Singapore to the south. Located in the historical region of Tanah Merah, its terrain is flat as a result of sand quarrying during the 1960s.

Tampines is divided into five subzones: Tampines North, Tampines East, Tampines West, Simei, and Xilin. These subzones were established in the early 1990s for urban planning purposes and do not correspond to the three political constituencies in the area. The subzones are primarily residential, except Xilin, which contains commercial, industrial, and recreational developments. Xilin contains Singapore Expo, the country's largest convention centre, along with several golf courses.

Located approximately 12 km (7.5 miles) east of the city centre, Tampines was designated as Singapore's first regional centre under the 1991 Concept Plan to decentralise commercial activity outside the Central Area. Financial institutions and corporations, including OCBC and UOB, maintain back-office operations in the regional centre. According to the Urban Redevelopment Authority, the regional centre contains 200,000 m^{2} of office space and 112,000 m^{2} of retail space. Tampines also includes Changi Business Park, a 71,000 m^{2} commercial development that houses offices for multinational companies such as J.P. Morgan, Credit Suisse, IBM, and Standard Chartered. As of 2016, the planning area had 152,400 resident working persons.

Tampines New Town covers 1,200 hectares in the northern portion of the planning area, of which 549 hectares is dedicated to residential use. The town's boundaries, as defined by the Housing Development Board, exclude Xilin and the private housing estates of Simei. As of 2024, Tampines is the most populous HDB town in Singapore, with 242,610 residents living in public housing. Ongoing developments in Tampines North and Tampines West are projected to increase the total housing supply to 110,000 dwelling units. In 2021, a pilot project established a single dedicated contractor to manage municipal services across the town.

== Etymology ==
The name Tampines appears on the Jackson Plan map in 1828, one of the earliest detailed surveys of Singapore. The area was named after Sungei Tampines, a river flowing through its northern part, which derived its name from the tempinis trees (Malay for Sloetia elongata, pronounced [təmpinis]) that grew along its banks. The spelling "Tampines" is a British colonial-era anglicisation of the Malay name.

According to the National Heritage Board (NHB), the tempinis tree population became nearly extinct in Singapore due to unsustainable exploitation during early urban development. A replanting initiative was launched in 1995 to reintroduce the tree across various parts of Tampines.

== History ==
In the nineteenth century, Tampines was covered by forests, swamps, and sand quarries, with tempinis (also called Riau ironwood) trees growing in the area.

Tampines Road originated as a bridle path before being upgraded to a cart track in 1864. The road extended from the 6th milestone of Serangoon Road (present-day Kovan) to Changi Road in the east. Settlements established along this route included Kampong Teban, Teck Hock Village, Hun Yeang Village, and Kampong Tampines, where dwellings were predominantly constructed from zinc and attap.

=== Early 20th century ===
By the early 20th century, Tampines developed into a major plantation area for coconut palms, rubber, and fruit trees. Tempenis Para and Coconut Plantations Limited held over 3,000 acres of land in 1910, with a board of directors that included Tan Chay Yan and Lim Boon Keng. Other prominent plantation owners in the area included Khoo Hun Yeang and Lim Nee Soon. By 1932, plantations in the area included the Yeo Tek Ho, Yap, Thai Hin, Hun Yeang, and Loh Lam estates, along with holdings owned by Bukit Sembawang Estates Limited and the Singapore United Rubber Plantation. Tampines Road remained the primary access route through the area.

The region also supported livestock rearing and vegetable farming, and served as a military training area until approximately 1987.

=== World War II ===
During the Japanese occupation of Singapore, a tennis court in Tampines was used as a military screening centre where Japanese forces detained and interrogated over 300 men.

The detainees included 22 members of a single family associated with war hero Lim Bo Seng. Following a morning raid on their residence, the men were separated from the women, bound, and marched to the screening site. Nine of the detained family members were subsequently executed or disappeared.

=== Post-war period ===
Sand quarrying in Tampines began in 1912 and expanded during the 1960s due to demand for sand for urban redevelopment projects, with the area hosting over 20 sand quarries.

The industry caused environmental degradation, including silt and mud runoff into nearby waterways, landslides, localized flooding, and air pollution. The Singapore government introduced regulations for quarry operations in 1981.

All quarrying in Tampines ceased by 1991. Several former quarries were converted into commercial fishing ponds and recreational sites, while others were filled in during the construction of Tampines New Town. One quarry was developed into Bedok Reservoir, while another near Tampines Avenue 10 remained disused.

=== Late 20th century ===
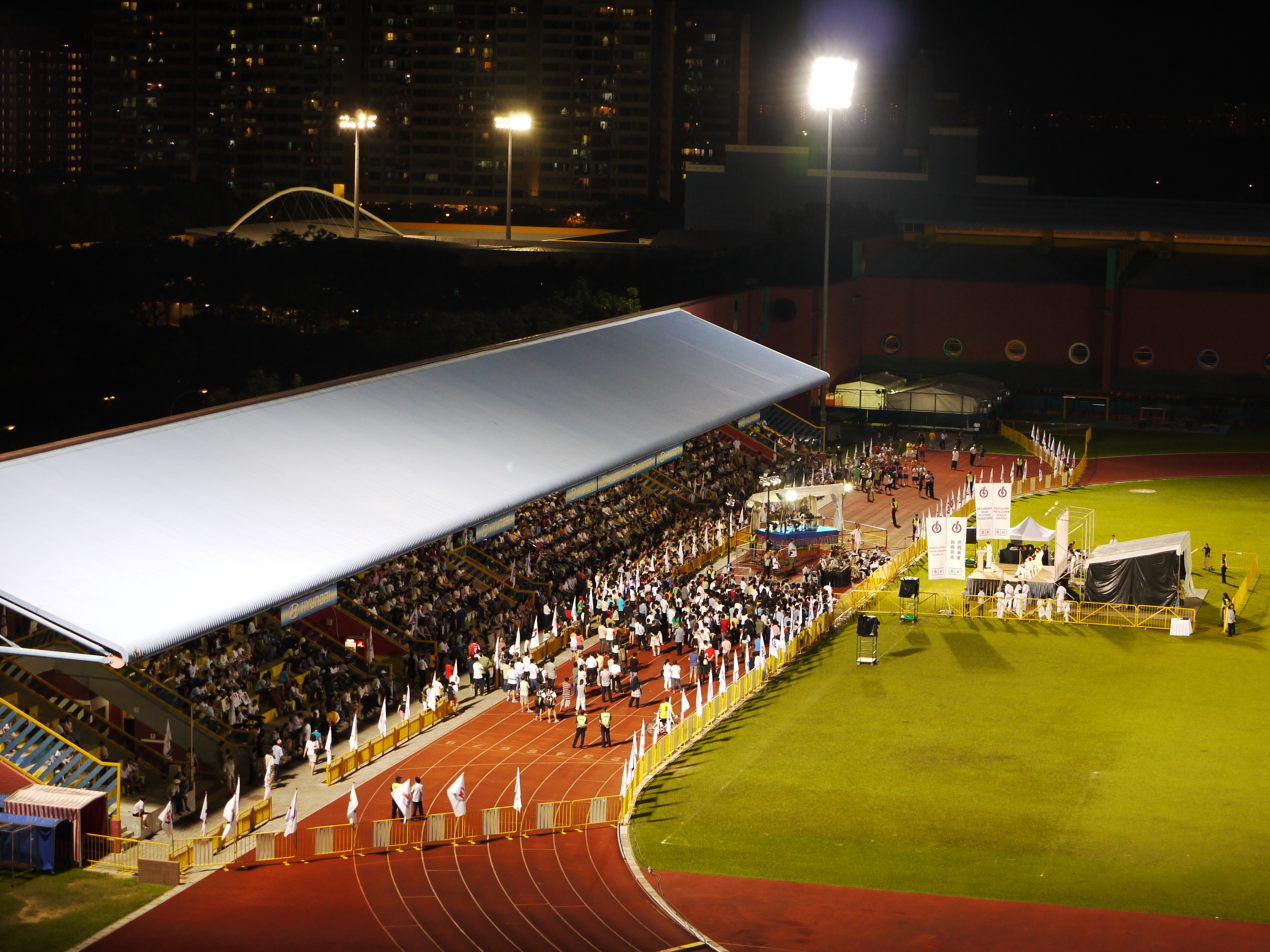
Old Tampines Stadium

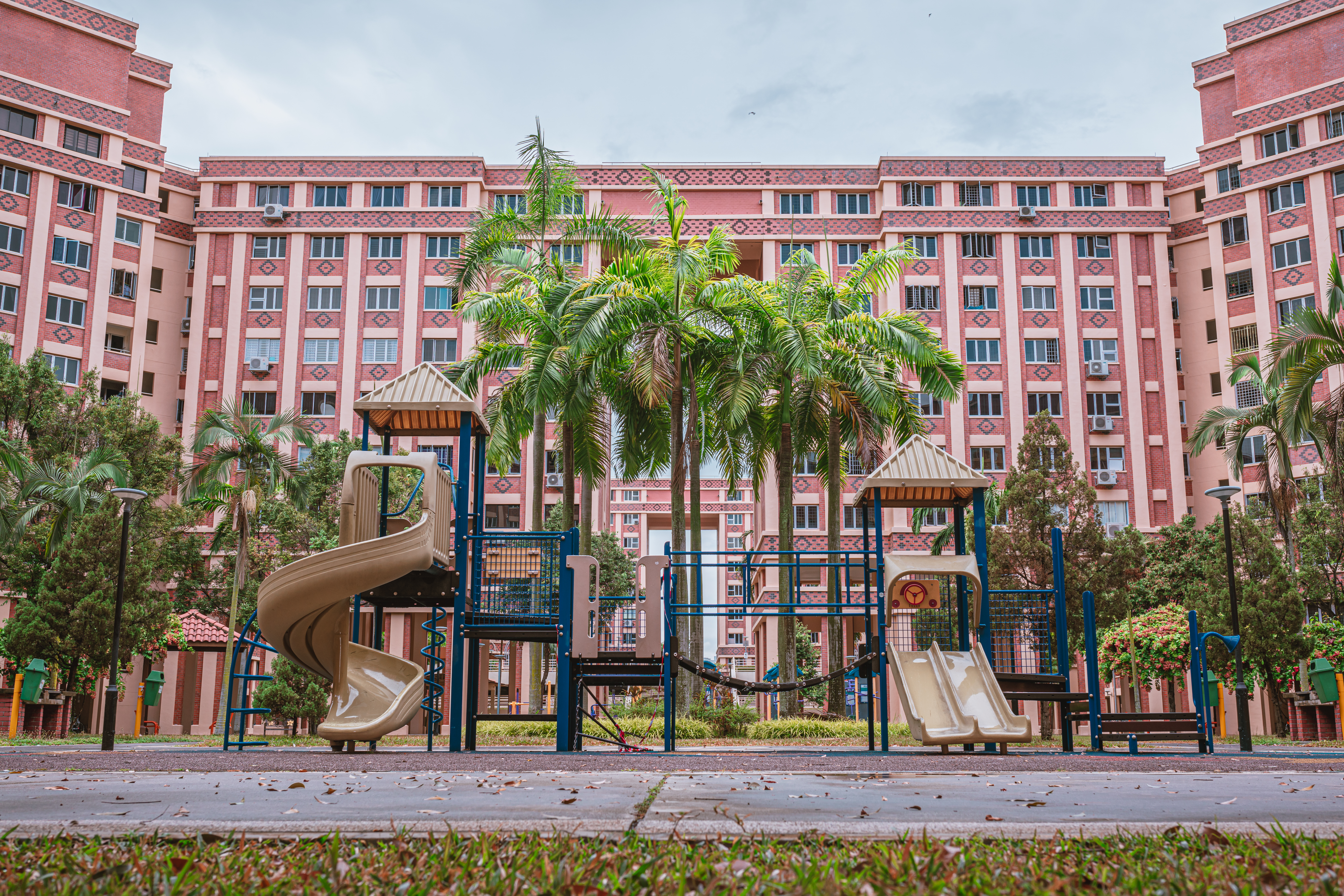
Public housing in Tampines

Development of Tampines New Town began in 1978. Initial construction focused on Neighbourhoods 1 and 2, which were completed between 1983 and 1987. Neighbourhoods 8 and 9 were built between 1985 and 1989. Neighbourhood 5 and the Tampines Town Centre were completed in 1989, while Neighbourhood 4 was completed alongside the Tampines North Division between 1986 and 1988. The estate was administratively organized into four divisions: Tampines East, Tampines West, Tampines North, and Tampines Changkat.

Early Mass Rapid Transit (MRT) planning documents designated the area as "Tampines North" and "Tampines South" before these station names were officially updated in 1985 to Tampines and Simei, respectively.

Prefabricated construction techniques were utilised during the development of the town, and architectural variations in block designs and color schemes were introduced. The Town Centre was laid out in an hourglass configuration. The Housing and Development Board (HDB) administered the town until 1991, when management responsibilities were transferred to the Tampines Town Council, composed of local residents and grassroot leaders.

On 5 October 1992, the Building and Social Housing Foundation of the United Nations presented the World Habitat Award to Tampines, selecting it as a representative example of Singapore's new towns for its urban settlement design.

Neighbourhoods 3 and 7 were completed in 1997, coinciding with an electoral boundary adjustment that established the Tampines Central division.

=== 21st century ===
Residential construction resumed around 2010 with the development of public housing and private residential projects in Tampines Central, including The Premiere @ Tampines, Tampines GreenLeaf, Centrale 8, Tampines Trilliant, Citylife @ Tampines, Tampines GreenTerrace, Arc @ Tampines, Q Bay Residences, and The Santorini.

Construction on Neighbourhood 6, designated as Tampines North, commenced following the launch of its initial Build-To-Order (BTO) project, Tampines GreenRidges, in November 2014 within the Park West District.

Housing and Urban Development Company (HUDC) estate Tampines Court, which had been privatized in 2002, was sold via en-bloc sale in July 2017, with residents vacating by December 2018.The site was subsequently redeveloped as the condominium Treasure at Tampines in 2023.

== Demographics ==
=== Population history ===
Resident Population 2000-2025
Year	Pop.	±% p.a.
2000	253,110	—
2005	250,850	−0.18%
2010	261,740	+0.85%
2015	261,230	−0.04%
2020	259,900	−0.10%
2025	290,090	+2.22%
2026	296,060	+2.06%

As of 2026, Tampines East is the most populous subzone in Tampines and Singapore, with 124,770 residents.

=== Age profile ===
The data below is from the population report published by the Singapore Department of Statistics as of June 2026.

Age Group (years)	Males	Females	Total Population	% of Total Population
0–4	7,740	7,130	14,870	5.02
5–9	7,850	7,490	15,340	5.18
10–14	7,180	6,630	13,810	4.66
15–19	6,810	6,180	12,990	4.39
20–24	6,700	6,570	13,270	4.48
25–29	9,150	9,180	18,330	6.19
30–34	13,340	14,240	27,580	9.32
35–39	13,330	13,640	26,970	9.11
40–44	10,250	10,870	21,120	7.13
45–49	8,940	9,550	18,490	6.25
50–54	8,210	8,980	17,190	5.81
55–59	8,170	9,750	17,920	6.05
60–64	9,790	11,230	21,020	7.10
65–69	10,070	11,140	21,210	7.16
70–74	8,150	8,610	16,760	5.66
75–79	5,110	5,550	10,660	3.60
80–84	1,830	2,430	4,260	1.44
85–89	1,030	1,760	2,790	0.94
90+	430	1,090	1,520	0.51

Age group (years)	Males	Females	Total population	% of total population
0–14	22,770	21,250	44,020	14.9
15–64	94,690	100,190	194,880	65.8
65+	26,620	30,580	57,200	19.3

Population pyramid of Tampines in 2026

The population distribution of Tampines in 2026 demonstrates an ageing structure. There is a higher population concentration among younger middle-aged groups, with males and females both peaking around the 30 to 34 age range at 4.51% and 4.81% of the population respectively.

The proportion of elderly residents above age 65, 19.3%, is similar to the national average of 19.5%. Notably, there is a higher proportion of children in Tampines (14.9%) as compared to the national average of 13.3%. This reflects a smaller share of the working-age population in Tampines

=== Household ===
Resident population by dwelling type in Tampines (2000−2026)
Year	HDB flats		Condominiums and other apartments		Landed properties	
Year	Pop.	Percentage	Pop.	Percentage	Pop.	Percentage
2000	239,350	94.6%	8,360	3.3%	4,560	1.8%
2005	228,240	91%	17,230	6.9%	4,470	1.8%
2010	236,000	90.2%	19,730	7.5%	4,690	1.8%
2015	231,850	88.8%	23,540	9%	4,630	1.8%
2020	226,370	87.1%	27,770	10.7%	4,480	1.7%
2025	246,930	85.1%	37,160	12.8%	4,340	1.5%
2026	250,900	84.7%	39,080	13.2%	4,280	1.4%

As of 2026, the proportion of residents residing in HDB flats (84.7%) in Tampines is higher than the national proportion of HDB dwellers (75.5%), reflecting a greater prevalence of public housing in the area.

Among the population, 112,160 residents, or 37.9% of the population, live in 4-Room HDB flats, making it the most common type of dwelling.

As of 2025, the average household size in Tampines is approximately 3.15, higher than the national average of 3.1. Among the 103,500 households in Tampines, the most common household size is three persons, representing 25.1% of total households. This is followed by a household size of two persons, representing 23.3% of all households.

Tampines has a home ownership rate of 94.3% as of 2025. This is higher than the national home ownership rate of 91.2%, reflecting a greater prevalence of homeowners in Tampines.

=== Ethnicity ===
Ethnic groups in Tampines (2000−2020)
Year	Chinese		Malays		Indians		Others	
Year	Pop.	Percentage	Pop.	Percentage	Pop.	Percentage	Pop.	Percentage
2000	176,021	69.5%	57,044	22.5%	15,513	6.1%	4,535	1.8%
2010	173,677	66.4%	57,584	22%	21,411	8.2%	9,071	3.5%
2015	175,470	67.2%	56,010	21.4%	21,560	8.3%	8,200	3.1%
2020	173,660	66.8%	56,570	21.8%	21,700	8.3%	7,970	3.1%
2025	191,600	66%	64,480	22.2%	24,580	8.5%	9,440	3.3%

Tampines is one of the most ethnically diverse planning areas in Singapore According to the 2025 General Household Survey, Tampines ranks second, after Woodlands, in terms of the largest Malay population among planning areas at 22.2% of its residents, compared to the national average of 13.5%.

=== Religion ===
Religious affiliation in Tampines (2025 est.)
1. Buddhism (30.0%)
2. Islam (24.2%)
3. No religion (23.1%)
4. Christianity (12.8%)
5. Taoism (5.70%)
6. Hinduism (3.80%)
7. Sikhism (0.20%)

Consistent with the rest of Singapore, the largest religion in Tampines is Buddhism, with 77,800 practising residents (30.0% of the population). The second most common group consists of residents practising Islam (62,800 residents, 24.2%), followed closely by those with no religion (59,800 residents, 23.1%). Christianity is practised by 33,300 residents (12.8%), including 15,200 Catholics (5.9%). Other religious affiliations include Taoism (14,800 residents, 5.7%), Hinduism (9,800 residents, 3.8%), and Sikhism (500 residents, 0.2%).

The proportion of residents practising Islam in Tampines (24.2%) is the second-highest among all planning areas in Singapore, after Woodlands, and considerably higher than the national average of 15.0%.

=== Education ===
As of 2025, 99.0% of the population aged above 15 in Tampines is literate, slightly higher than the national average of 98.6%.

74.4% of residents are literate in two languages, with the most common language pair being English and Chinese (47.7%). 4.7% of residents are literate in three or more languages.

Highest qualification attained of non-student resident population aged 15 years and over (2025 est.)
Qualification	Percentage	Singapore average
Below secondary	19.3%	19.9%
Secondary	16.3%	14.6%
Post-secondary (non-tertiary)	11.2%	11.1%
Polytechnic diploma	12.0%	10.2%
Professional qualification and other diploma	7.0%	7.5%
University	34.3%	36.7%

The proportion of residents in Tampines whose highest educational qualification is secondary education (16.3%) is the second-highest among all planning areas in Singapore, after Woodlands (17.2%).

=== Language ===
Languages most frequently spoken at home, Tampines (2025 est.)
Languages	percent
English	60.8%
Mandarin Chinese	23.4%
Malay	10.0%
Non-Mandarin varieties	3.5%
Tamil	1.29%
Others	0.65%
Other Indian languages	0.34%

In Tampines, the proportion of residents using English as the most frequently spoken language (60.8%) is higher than the national average of 58.1%. Additionally, there are 3,400 Tamil speakers, representing 79.1% of the total 4,300 Indian language speakers.

=== Employment and income ===
According to the 2025 General Household Survey, Tampines has a labour force of 177,900 residents, of which 171,900 are employed. This equates to an employment rate of 96.6%, slightly lower than the national employment rate of 96.7%. The remaining 81,300 residents aged above 15 in Tampines (31.4%) are outside the labour force.

Gross monthly employment income of employed residents aged 15 years and over (2025 est.)
Employment income	Percentage	Singapore average
Below S$1,000	3.1%	3.9%
S$1,000–S$1,999	8.6%	9.4%
S$2,000–S$2,999	9.2%	9.5%
S$3,000–S$3,999	11.1%	10.3%
S$4,000–S$4,999	9.4%	8.8%
S$5,000–S$5,999	9.1%	8.2%
S$6,000–S$6,999	7.4%	6.9%
S$7,000–S$7,999	6.8%	5.9%
S$8,000–S$8,999	5.1%	5.2%
S$9,000–S$9,999	5.8%	4.5%
S$10,000–S$10,999	4.1%	4.3%
S$11,000–S$11,999	3.5%	3.5%
S$12,000–S$14,999	7.5%	7.3%
S$15,000–S$19,999	4.5%	5.8%
S$20,000 and over	4.7%	6.7%

Monthly household employment income (2025 est.)
Household employment income	Percentage	Singapore average
No employed person	12.5%	14.2%
Below S$1,000	0.4%	1.2%
S$1,000–S$1,999	3.1%	3.4%
S$2,000–S$2,999	3.1%	3.7%
S$3,000–S$3,999	3.9%	4.2%
S$4,000–S$4,999	2.8%	3.7%
S$5,000–S$5,999	4.3%	4.1%
S$6,000–S$6,999	4.3%	4.0%
S$7,000–S$7,999	4.4%	3.6%
S$8,000–S$8,999	3.7%	3.8%
S$9,000–S$9,999	4.3%	3.7%
S$10,000–S$10,999	4.0%	3.8%
S$11,000–S$11,999	4.2%	3.7%
S$12,000–S$12,999	4.3%	3.5%
S$13,000–S$13,999	3.3%	3.2%
S$14,000–S$14,999	4.1%	2.8%
S$15,000–S$17,499	7.1%	6.2%
S$17,500–S$19,999	6.4%	5.5%
S$20,000–S$24,999	8.8%	8.0%
S$25,000–S$29,999	4.6%	5.0%
S$30,000–S$34,999	2.7%	3.3%
S$35,000 and over	3.7%	5.5%

=== Crime ===
In 2016, Tampines had the second highest number of snatch thefts (6), the third highest number of robberies (7), and the third highest number of unlicensed moneylending harassment cases (186) in Singapore. Additionally, Tampines averaged the third highest number of car thefts, with an annual increase of 17.8 cases from 2012 to 2016. However, these figures are largely attributed to the large population in Tampines. The crime rate in Tampines is not noticeably higher than the overall rate in Singapore, which remains among the lowest in the world.

Five Preventable Crimes (5Ps) Recorded By Tampines Neighbourhood Police Centre (NPC)
Crime	Rank (2023)	2023	2022	2021	2020	2019	2018	2017	2016	2015	2014	2013	2012	2011
Housebreaking	7=	5	3	1	3	5	1	2	5	5	13	11	9	27
Outrage Of Modesty	13	42	41	52	36	46	45	35	32	38	45	50	43	49
Robbery	4=	1	3	0	0	0	1	2	7	8	7	6	10	17
Snatch Theft	5=	1	1	0	2	0	0	1	6	4	3	13	11	10
Theft Of Motor Vehicle	1=	5	13	3	1	5	8	18	7	21	17	19	25	31
Total (for 5Ps)	11	54	61	56	42	56	55	58	57	76	85	99	98	134

In 2023, Tampines ranks 7th (tied with five others) among neighbourhoods in Singapore by number of housebreaking crimes, with five cases. This was down from 27 in 2011. Tampines NPC also had 42 cases of outrage of modesty in 2023, the 13th highest in Singapore. This number has remained relatively constant over the past decade.

Tampines NPC had only one recorded snatch theft case in 2023, a significant drop from 13 a decade ago. The number of robbery cases dropped from 17 in 2011 to only one in 2023. Similarly, the number of motor vehicle thefts dropped from 31 in 2011 to five in 2023. This is reflective of the overall trend in Singapore.

Changi NPC, which has the southern subzones of Tampines under its jurisdiction, saw one housebreaking, one motor vehicle theft and one snatch theft case in 2023. There were no robbery cases in its records for 2023.

== Economy ==
=== Cost of living ===
==== Housing ====
In the first quarter of 2024, Tampines had the highest median rent for executive apartments in Singapore, at S$4,000. It had the seventh highest rent for 5-room HDB flats, at S$3,600.

==== Food ====
Tampines is the 12th most expensive planning area for food, according to the 2016 Makan Index by the Lee Kuan Yew School of Public Policy (LKYSPP). Over the years, the cost of living in Tampines has risen significantly.

In 2023, the Makan Index revealed that Tampines had the highest price among 26 residential neighbourhoods for a lunch or dinner at a kopitiam, food court or hawker centre. It cost S$14.90 for a plate of chicken briyani with iced Milo. It also had the highest average price for a breakfast set in the East Region at S$3.39. As for beverages, Tampines had the highest average price for kopi at S$1.24 and for lime juice at S$1.81. Its kopitiams also sold iced Milo at an average price of S$1.92, the highest in the country.

These high food prices can be attributed to the high rents in Tampines. In 2024, a kopitiam in Tampines broke the record for the highest tendered rent, since the HDB's Price-Quality Method (PQM) for tenders began in 2016. There were 20 participating tenders in that particular exercise, with the successful tenderer setting the rent at $88,889.00. Four of the six most expensive coffeeshops under this tender method are in Tampines. In 2022, Tampines also set the record for the most expensive coffee shop by resale price in Singapore, at $41.68 million.

=== Industries ===
Together with the adjacent planning areas, Tampines contributes to the economy of the East Region of Singapore, which had a nominal GDP of US$50.246 million in 2023.

The 71-hectare Changi Business Park is home to logistics enterprises and leading technology corporations, like AMD. It is also home to numerous finance institutions, like DBS, Citibank, and JP Morgan.

The manufacturing industries are located in Tampines South and Changi South. Tampines Central is a hub for various financial institutions, ranging from banks to insurance companies, like OCBC, UOB, Income and AIA.

== Politics ==
=== Electoral boundaries ===
Tampines has been represented under various Single Member Constituencies (SMCs) and Group Representation Constituencies (GRCs) over the years.

Originally, Tampines was under the Tampines SMC, during a period when the town was still under development. As its population grew rapidly, the electoral boundaries were redrawn in 1988 to form the Tampines GRC and Eunos GRC. Eunos GRC was eventually dissolved in 1997, with the Tampines North ward being split and partially absorbed into both Pasir Ris GRC and Tampines GRC. The former GRC was dissolved and the remainder of Tampines North was absorbed back into latter Tampines GRC in the next election.

Between 2001 and 2025, Tampines was represented across three GRCs—the namesake Tampines (for Tampines North, Tampines East and Tampines West), Aljunied (for the area around Temasek Polytechnic) and East Coast (covering Xilin and Simei). Until 2020, the boundaries for Tampines were untouched until it incorporated the Tampines North industrial area. In 2025, Tampines has been reorganised into East Coast GRC, Tampines GRC, and the newly formed Tampines Changkat SMC. Tampines New Town now falls solely under the latter two constituencies, with the portion that was previously part of Aljunied GRC incorporated into Tampines GRC; Simei and Xilin still remain under Changi-Simei division of East Coast GRC.

=== Contesting parties ===
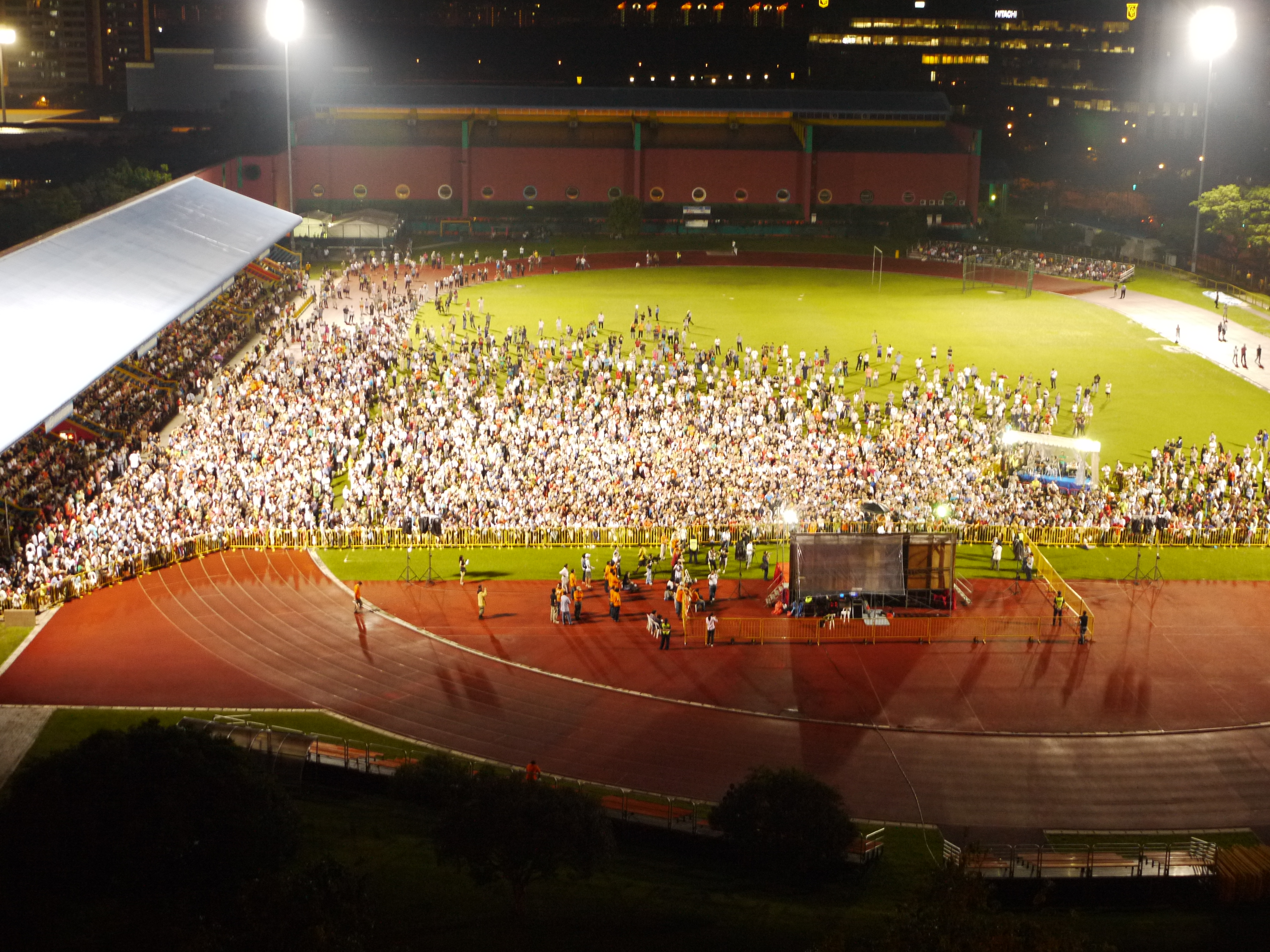
National Solidarity Party's GE2011 rally at the old Tampines Stadium

Most of Tampines has been represented by the People's Action Party (PAP) since the independence of Singapore, and three different political parties had challenged in the Tampines Planning area. Until 2025, Tampines GRC has seen straight contests between the PAP and the National Solidarity Party (NSP), who has contested the there in every election, except in 1997 when the latter had been disqualified. NSP also contested Tampines under the Singapore Democratic Alliance (SDA) banner in the 2001 and 2006 elections.

Workers' Party (WP) has also contested the northern parts of Tampines when Tampines North was under the Eunos GRC and Pasir Ris GRC; the WP, which led by two prominent candidates, former Solicitor general Francis Seow, and former PAP MP and former Barisan Sosialis leader Lee Siew Choh, contested in the 1988 and 1991 elections where they lost narrowly in the former GRC. WP later contested the Aljunied GRC and East Coast GRC since the 2006 election, with them winning the former in 2011, gaining the party’s first electoral foothold in Tampines, albeit only a small portion. In 2025, WP expanded its presence by contesting Tampines GRC and Tampines Changkat SMC, marking the first time the party contested across the entire Tampines Planning Area.

The People's Power Party (PPP) contested Tampines GRC in the 2025 general election, making it the only GRC that year to feature a four-cornered contest. The team was led by the party's Secretary-General, Goh Meng Seng, who had previously contested in Tampines GRC in the 2011 election under the NSP banner.

=== Members of Parliament ===
Minister of State for Communications and Information Tay Eng Soon was responsible for the Tampines North ward in Eunos GRC from 1988 until his death in 1993. The northern areas of Tampines was currently managed by North East CDC mayor and Minister of State Baey Yam Keng (a former Tanjong Pagar GRC MP) since 2011, and later in 2025, Minister for Culture, Community and Youth and former major-general David Neo.

Tampines GRC was first led by Mah Bow Tan until his retirement from politics in 2015; Minister of the Social and Family Development Masagos Zulkifli, having first elected in the area in the 2006 election, served as the leading MP, alongside former Deputy Prime Minister and Minister for Finance Heng Swee Keat, who was the MP for Tampines Central between 2011 and 2020 before being deployed to the neighbouring East Coast GRC.

Tampines Changkat was first managed by Aline Wong, one of the first female office holders in post-independent Singapore; since 2015, Desmond Choo (former branch secretary for Hougang SMC and candidate in 2011) served as the MP for Tampines Changkat. The Simei and Xilin areas were currently managed by Jessica Tan since 2006.

== Sports ==
=== Tampines Rovers F.C. ===
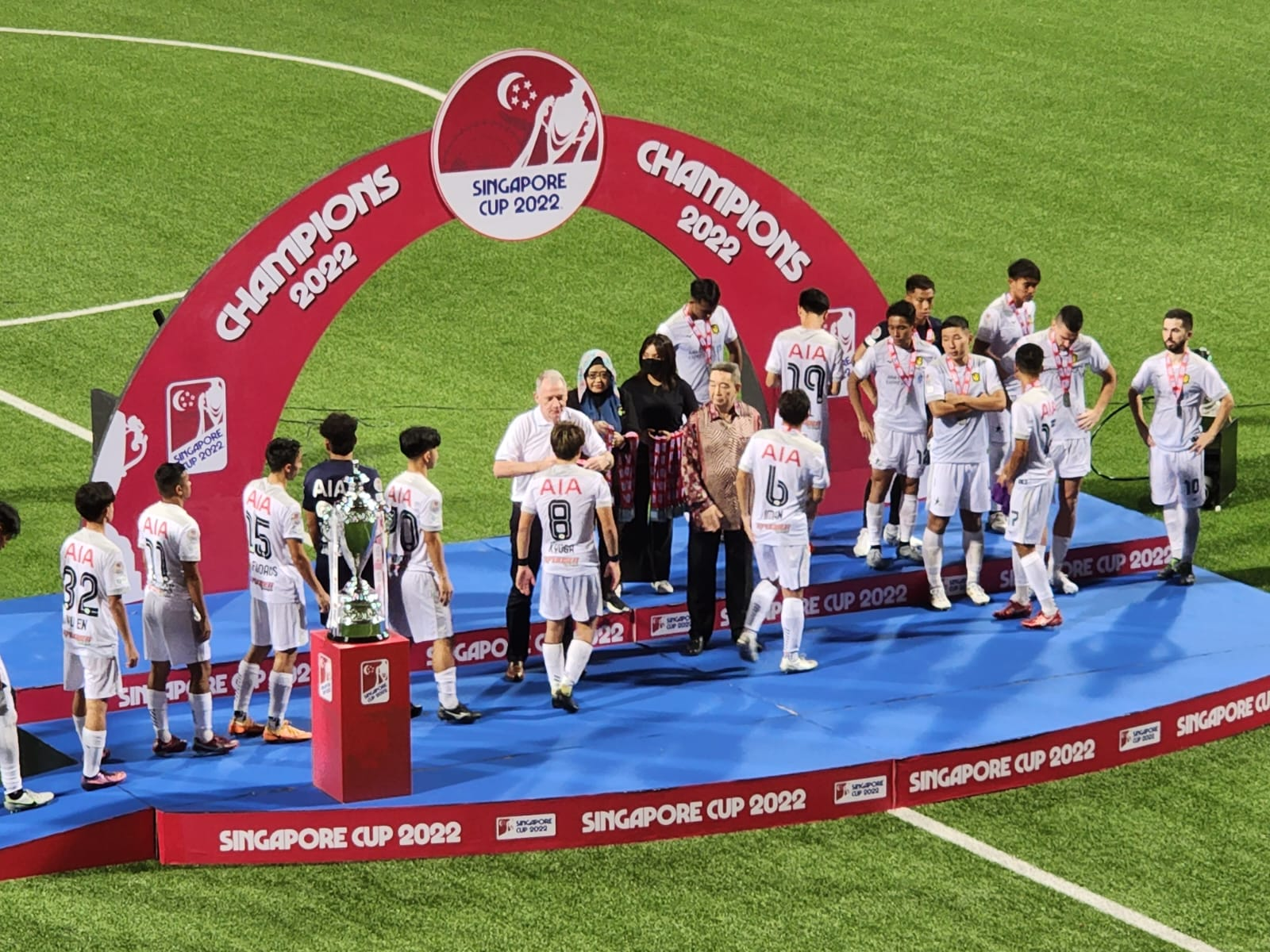
Tampines Rovers in 2022

The town has a professional football club, Tampines Rovers Football Club. It competes in the Singapore Premier League, the top tier of the Singapore football league system. It is sometimes referred to by its official nickname, The Stags.

Founded in 1945, the club has won five league titles, four Singapore Cups, a record five Community Shield and one ASEAN Club Championship. This makes it one of the most decorated football clubs in Singapore.

The club used to play at the old Tampines Stadium until its demolition in 2013. After the completion of Our Tampines Hub on the same site, the club now plays its home fixtures at the 5,000-seat football stadium located within the integrated complex.

== Education ==
The eleven primary schools, nine secondary schools, three tertiary institutions, and two international schools to provide education for Tampines residents and those living in the region. There are plans to add new schools in Tampines due to a high demand in the East Region of the city-state of Singapore.

=== Primary schools ===
- Angsana Primary School
- Changkat Primary School
- Chongzheng Primary School
- East Spring Primary School
- Gongshang Primary School
- Junyuan Primary School
- Saint Hilda's Primary School
- Tampines North Primary School
- Tampines Primary School
- Yumin Primary School
- Poi Ching School

=== Secondary schools ===
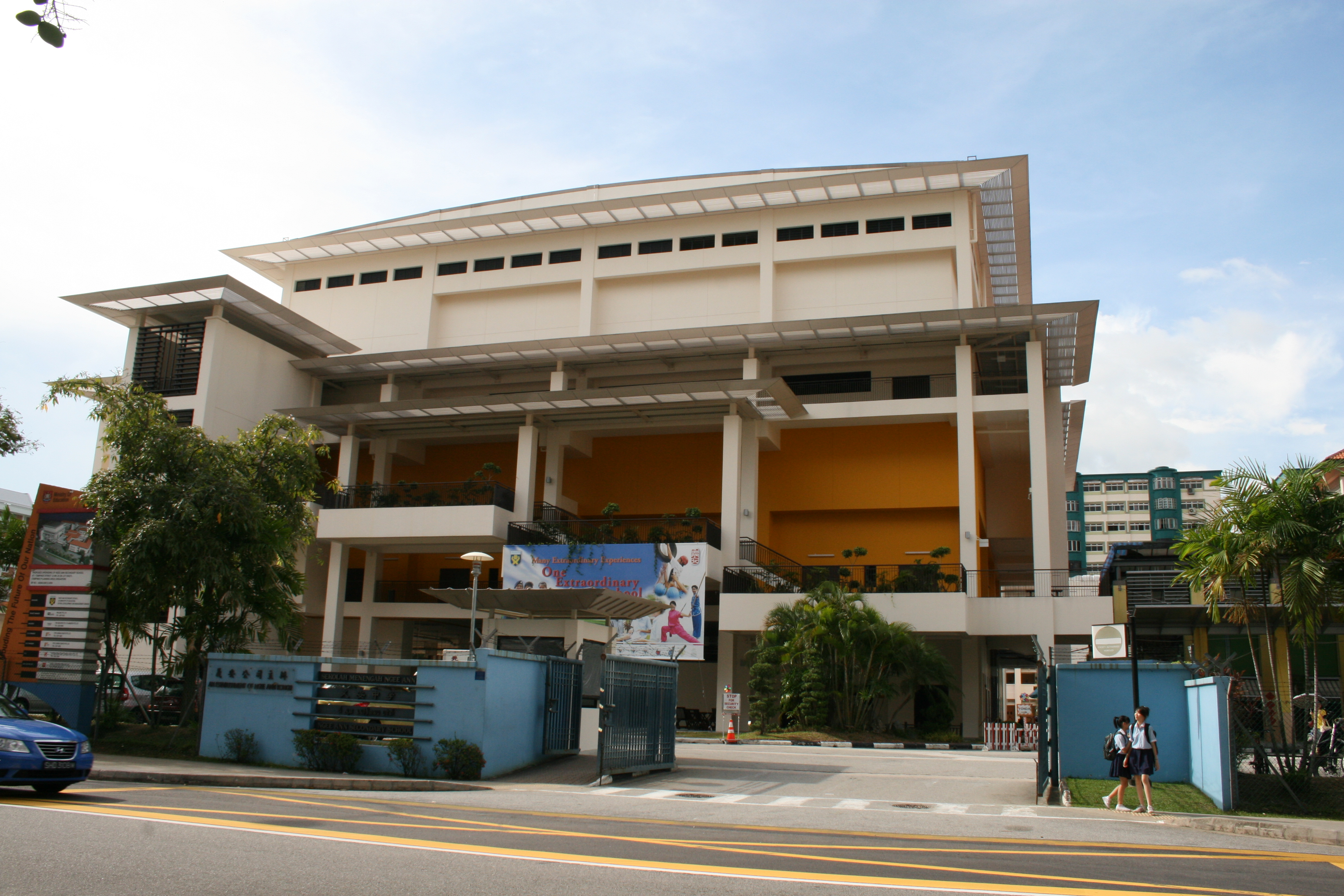
Ngee Ann Secondary School

- Changkat Changi Secondary School
- Dunman Secondary School
- East Spring Secondary School
- Junyuan Secondary School
- Ngee Ann Secondary School
- Pasir Ris Secondary School
- Springfield Secondary School
- Saint Hilda's Secondary School
- Tampines Secondary School

=== Tertiary institutions ===
List
- ITE College East
- Singapore University of Technology and Design
- Temasek Junior College (temporarily located in Tampines East from Jan 2024 to Dec 2027, during which the Bedok South campus is reconstructed)
- Temasek Polytechnic

Temasek Polytechnic is a post-secondary academic institution in Tampines West. Established in April 1990, it is the third polytechnic in Singapore. Since its inception, it has grown to become a significant educational institution in the East Region, with 13,000 students enrolled. Temasek Polytechnic's extensive 36-hectare campus houses six different schools. It offers 37 full-time and more than 40 part-time diploma courses that cater to different industries, from aerospace engineering to accountancy and cybersecurity.

In 1998, Institute of Technical Education (ITE) established a small campus in Tampines Changkat, as part of a five-million dollar ITE 2000 plan to improve itself. ITE provides vocational and technical education to students, preparing them for careers in various industries. In 2005, ITE College East opened its doors in Simei. The 10.7-hectare campus offers a diverse range of courses that cater to the evolving needs of the workforce. In an effort to consolidate the older satellite campuses into this new campus, ITE College Tampines closed in 2010. ITE College East now comprises four schools, of which the School of Health Sciences is exclusive to the East campus. Its student population has grown steadily to 9,000 in 2023.

The Singapore University of Technology and Design (SUTD), established in 2012, moved to its permanent campus in Xilin in 2015. As the fourth public university in Singapore, SUTD specialises in design and technology education, and offers full-time undergraduate courses in five majors. It also offers seven Master programmes and three PhD programmes, and houses several research centres, including the Lee Kuan Yew Centre for Innovation Cities. The university ranks 128th in the 2023 QS Asian University Rankings.

The former Tampines Junior College was located in Tampines East, and provided pre-university education for GCE A-Level graduates. It merged with Meridian Junior College in 2020 to form Tampines Meridian Junior College, and moved into its sister campus in Pasir Ris.

=== Specialised institutions ===
List
- Pathlight School (Tampines)
- Metta School

Pathlight School will be opening a permanent campus in Tampines West in 2025. Together with the other existing campus in Ang Mo Kio, Pathlight School provides specialised educational programmes to the needs of students with autism and other developmental challenges. Built on the site former occupied by East View Primary School, the Tampines campus will take in 500 pupils with special educational needs (SEN).

Metta School, located in Simei, is a specialised institution catering to students aged 7 to 21 with mild intellectual disabilities (MID) and autism (ASD). Formed as an offshoot of Movement for the Intellectually Disabled of Singapore (MINDS), the school provides both certification and non-certification vocational training programmes tailored to meet the diverse learning needs of its students.

=== International schools ===
List
- UWCSEA East
- Middleton International School

United World College of South East Asia (UWCSEA) established its East Campus in Tampines in 2008. UWCSEA East provides a learning environment for 2,500 local and international students of ages 4 to 18.

Middleton International School is the second international school in Tampines, located on the site of the previous ITE College Tampines.

== Amenities ==
Tampines, which includes Tampines North and Simei is home to over 237,800 residents living in 152,000 HDB flats spread out over 20.89 square kilometres:

- Tampines North
- Tampines East
- Tampines Changkat
- Tampines Central
- Tampines West
- Simei
- Others (mainly commercial and industrial parks, with no nearby residential areas)
  - Tampines Retail Park
  - Tampines Industrial Park A
  - Tampines LogisPark
  - Tampines Wafer Fab Park
  - Tampines Hi-Tech Park
  - Tampines Advance Display Park

=== Tampines Regional Centre ===
The urban planning policy of Singapore is to create partially self-sufficient towns, in terms of commercial needs, to relieve strain on traffic drawn to the city centre. Thus, an array of facilities are provided primarily for residents in the new towns. Tampines is one of Singapore's four regional centres (along with Woodlands, Jurong East and future Seletar), under the plan of the Urban Redevelopment Authority. As a result, the Tampines Regional Centre serves the Tampines residents and the entire East Region.

=== Commercial services ===
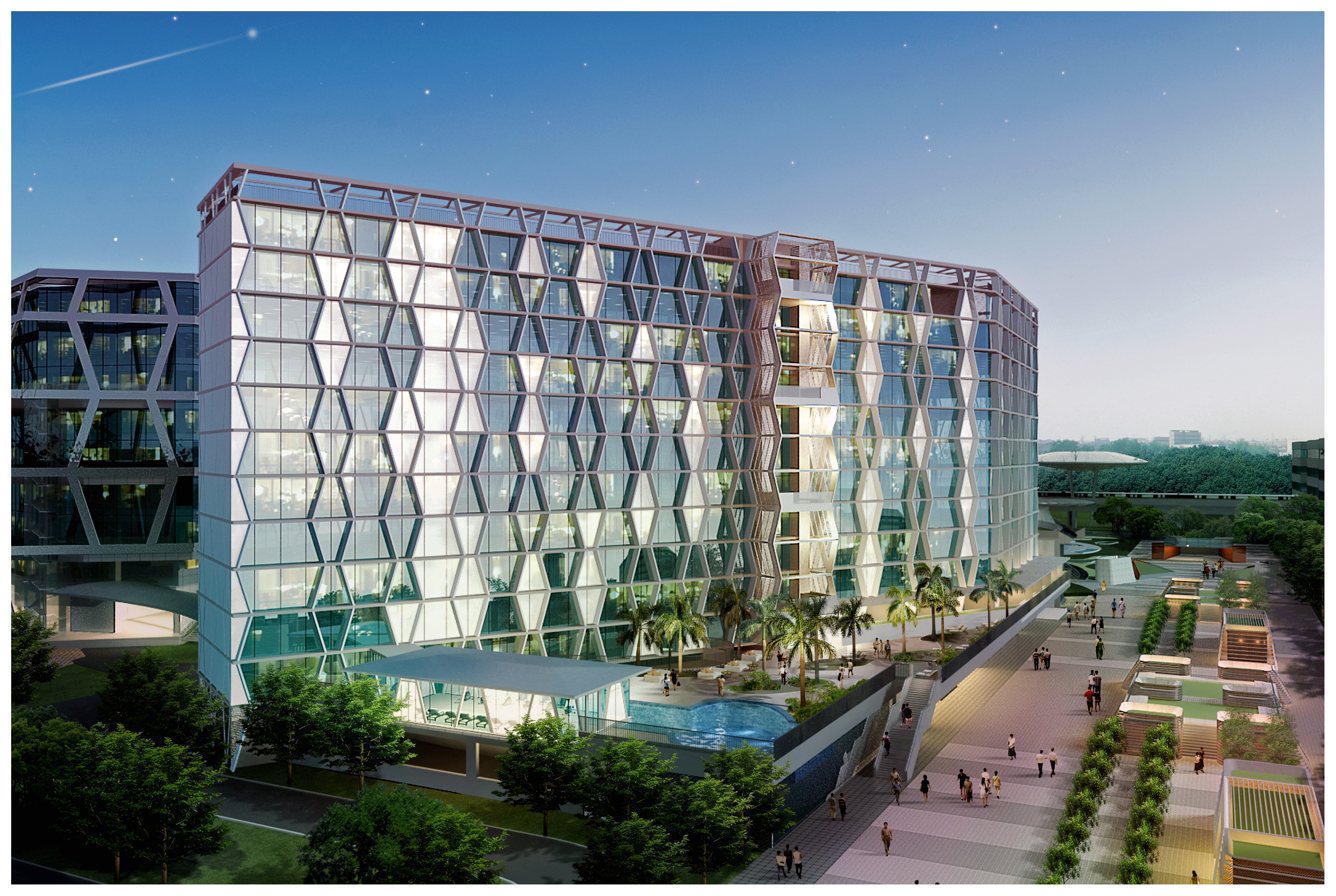
Artist's impression of Changi Business Park

There are three hotels in Tampines — Dusit Thani Laguna Singapore, Park Avenue Changi and capri by Fraser. Catered to business travellers, they are all located in and around Changi Business Park.

Retail shopping in the Tampines Regional Centre is done at four main shopping malls — Tampines Mall, Century Square, Tampines 1 and Our Tampines Hub. Commercial tenants of the shopping centres include restaurants, supermarkets, department stores, cinemas, bookstores, international money remittance and gift shops.

There are other malls outside the New Town as well, namely Eastpoint Mall, Singapore Expo, and Changi City Point.

On 30 November 2006, IKEA opened its second outlet and first megastore in Singapore at Tampines Retail Park, adjacent to Courts and Giant, together, these three are the first to have retail warehouse stores in Singapore. On 9 April 2009, UNIQLO opened its first outlet in Southeast Asia at Tampines 1.

=== Community services ===
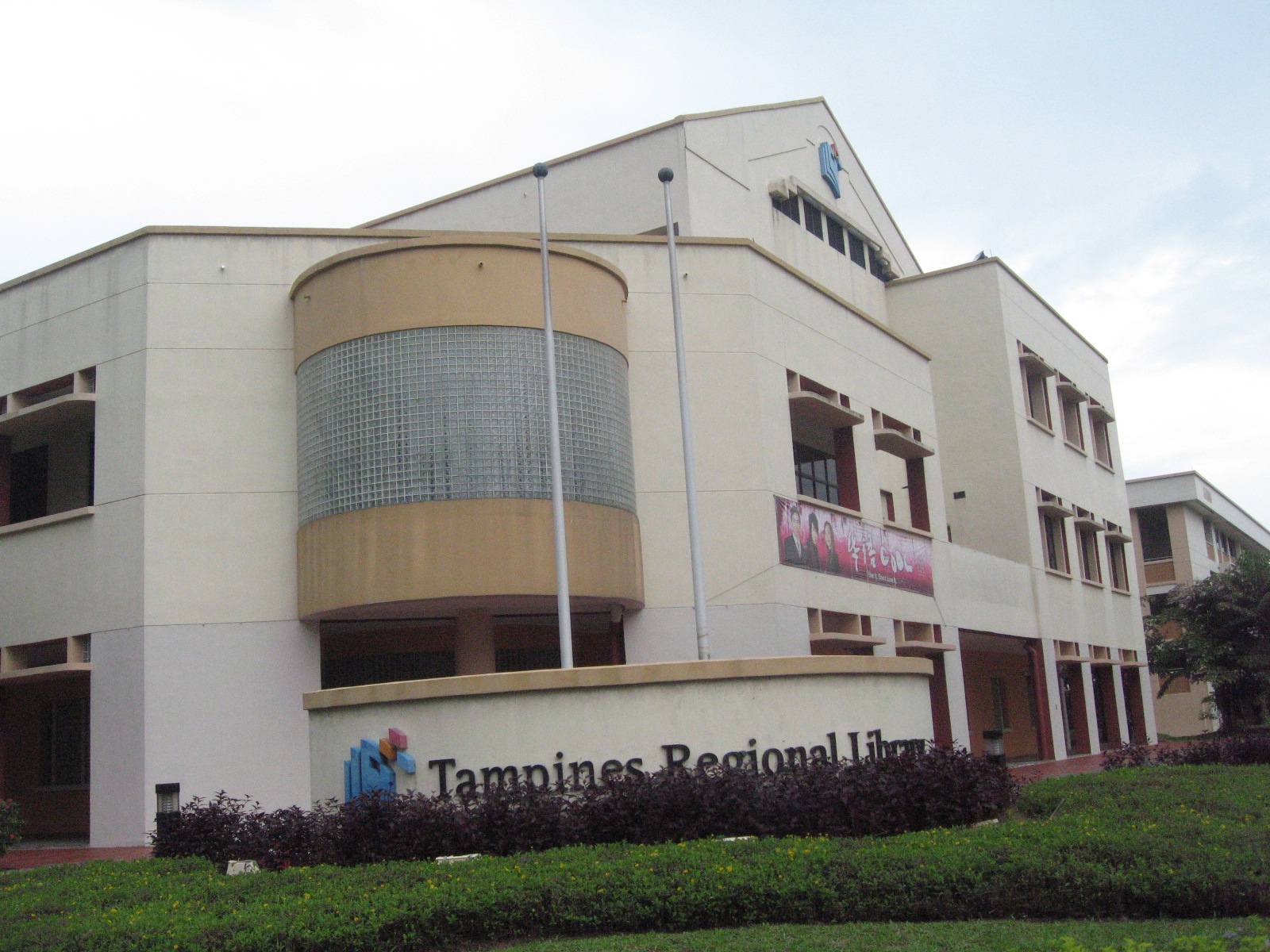
Old Tampines Library

Tampines Library, the first regional public library in Singapore, was initially located along Tampines Avenue 7 and officially opened on 3 December 1994. It served as a "prototype library" to test new services and features before their implementation at other branch libraries. It was converted into a cybersecurity facility called Tachyon@31 in September 2023.

The library was relocated to Our Tampines Hub in 2017, an integrated community and lifestyle hub. This new location continues to serve the eastern part of Singapore, offering expanded facilities and services. The library's initial concept was to be a "library of the future," aligning with the Library 2000 Review Committee's vision.

Tampines has six community clubs, which are managed by the People's Association and provide a wide range of services. Among them, Tampines Central Community Club is housed within Our Tampines Hub. These community clubs are common spaces for residents to come together, and they occasionally provide information from the government on national policies through events and booths.

=== Healthcare ===
Changi General Hospital (CGH) is a major restructured hospital operated by SingHealth in Simei, one of the subzones in the Tampines. It is the fourth largest healthcare facility in Singapore, with a capacity of 1,000 beds. As Singapore's first purpose-built general hospital, it caters to communities in the East Region of Singapore. The hospital houses six specialist centres and encompass a wide range of disciplines, such as cardiology, orthopaedic surgery, and sports medicine. In Newsweek's World's Best Specialized Hospitals 2024 ranking, CGH ranks 48th in pulmonology, 69th in neurosurgery, 113th in orthopaedics, and 164th in oncology.

Other healthcare facilities include two polyclinics, with one in Tampines East and the other in Tampines North. These polyclinics offer a wide array of health services for residents, from management of chronic diseases to treatment of acute medical conditions. Besides the polyclinics, Tampines has several nursing homes and elderly day care centres to support its ageing population.

=== Neighbourhood centres ===
List
- N1: Tampines Street 11 Neighbourhood Centre
- N2: Tampines N2 Shopping Street
- N3: Tampines Mart
- N4: N4 Neighbourhood Centre
- N5: Tampines Central Shopping Street
- N6: Tampines Avenue 11 mixed-use site (working name; under construction)
- N8: ShopTWest
- N9: Tampines Street 94 mixed-use site (working name; tender in progress)

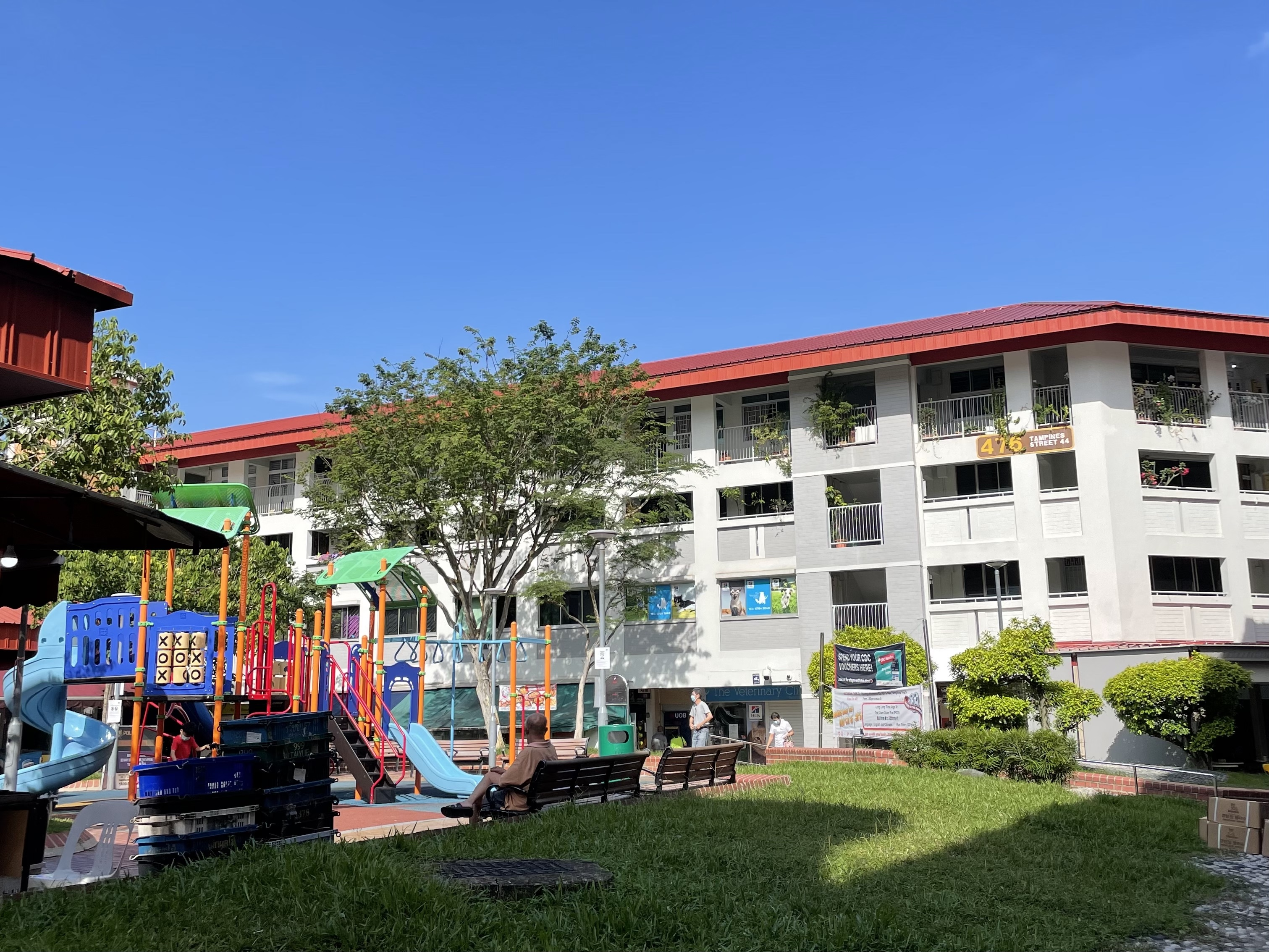
Tampines N4 Neighbourhood Centre

As of 2025, there are six neighbourhood centres in Tampines, as gazetted in the URA Master Plan. They are located in neighbourhoods 1 to 5 and 8.

Tampines Street 11 Neighbourhood Centre is the first in the planning area. Developments in the neighbourhood centre include the Tampines Town Council and Tampines Round Market & Food Centre, which opened in 1983 as the first hawker centre in Tampines.

Tampines N2 Shopping Street has Singapore's most expensive coffee shop, which was sold for a record $41.68 million. The 604-square-metre establishment, known as 21 Street Eating House, features 18 stalls. This purchase price translates to approximately $6,411 per square foot, nearly matching the average rate for ground-level retail units in Far East Plaza and Lucky Plaza along Orchard Road.

Tampines Central Shopping Street and ShopTWest see a comparatively high footfall, due to their proximity to Tampines MRT Station and Temasek Polytechnic respectively.

Two additional neighbourhood centres have been planned. One of them will be located on a mixed-use site in Tampines North, sharing the land plot with the Tampines North Integrated Transport Hub. In 2022, a consortium comprising UOL Group, Singapore Land, and CapitaLand Development submitted the highest bid of S$1.206 billion to develop the site. The other future neighbourhood centre will be constructed in the Tampines South estate, as part of a proposed mixed-use development. On 27 June 2024, the HDB launched the sale of the site via public tender. This site has the potential to accommodate 585 residential units and will feature a gross floor area of 61,837 square metres. The development will include an early childhood development centre (ECDC), a supermarket, a food court, and a community plaza, with an underpass connection to Tampines West MRT station.

=== Our Tampines Hub ===
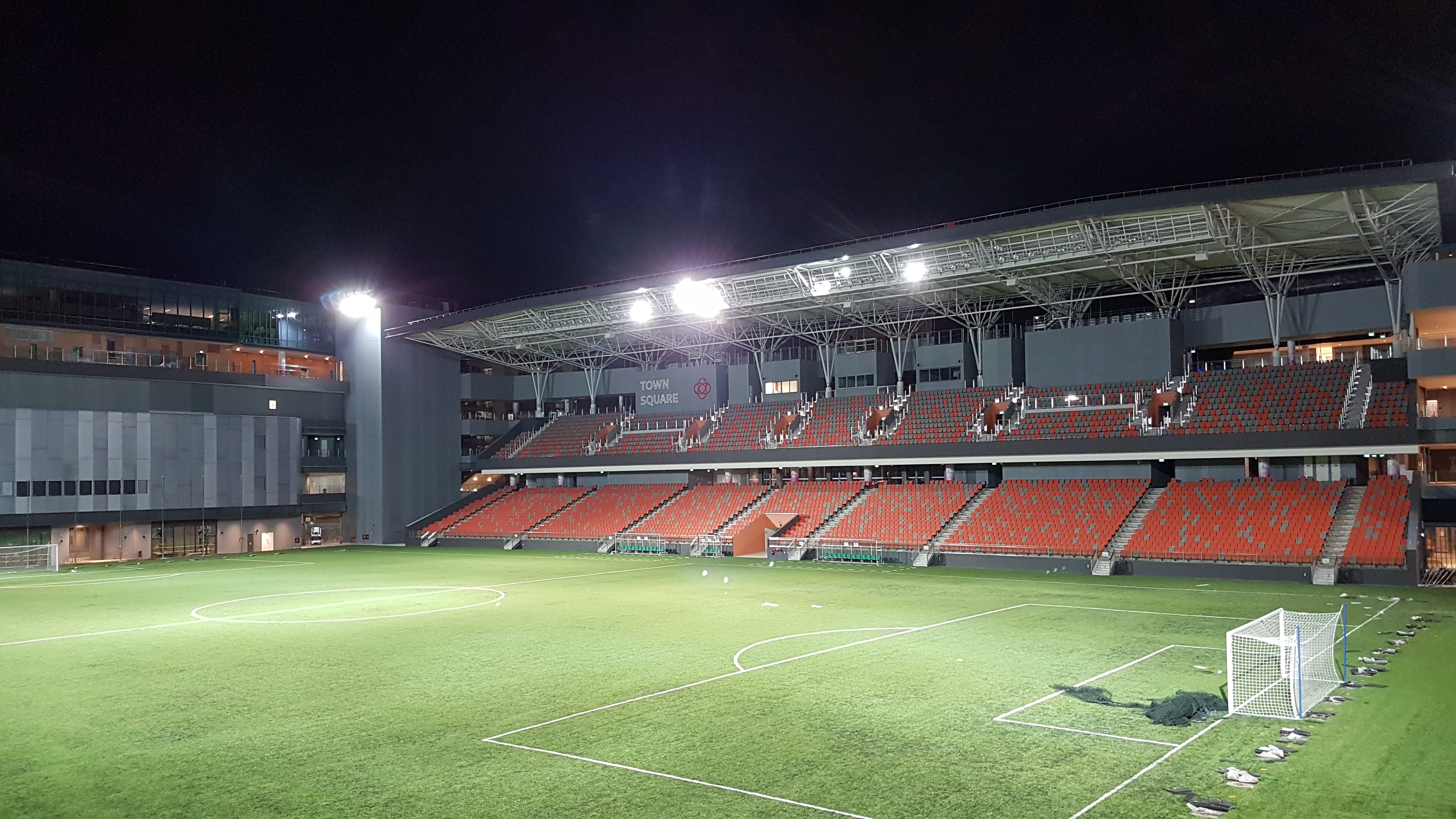
Stadium in Our Tampines Hub

Our Tampines Hub is a new development in Tampines. Construction began in June 2013 and it opened on 9 November 2016. It is located at the site of the former Tampines Stadium along Avenue 4 and 5, together with the swimming pool.

It is built for the residents of Tampines and provides a community space where residents can gather, interact, and bond with others from the community. Facilities available include a community centre, sports and recreation centres, swimming pools, bowling alleys, karaoke facilities, information centres, and several offices. The Tampines Library was also relocated here.

== Parks and recreation ==
=== Large parks ===
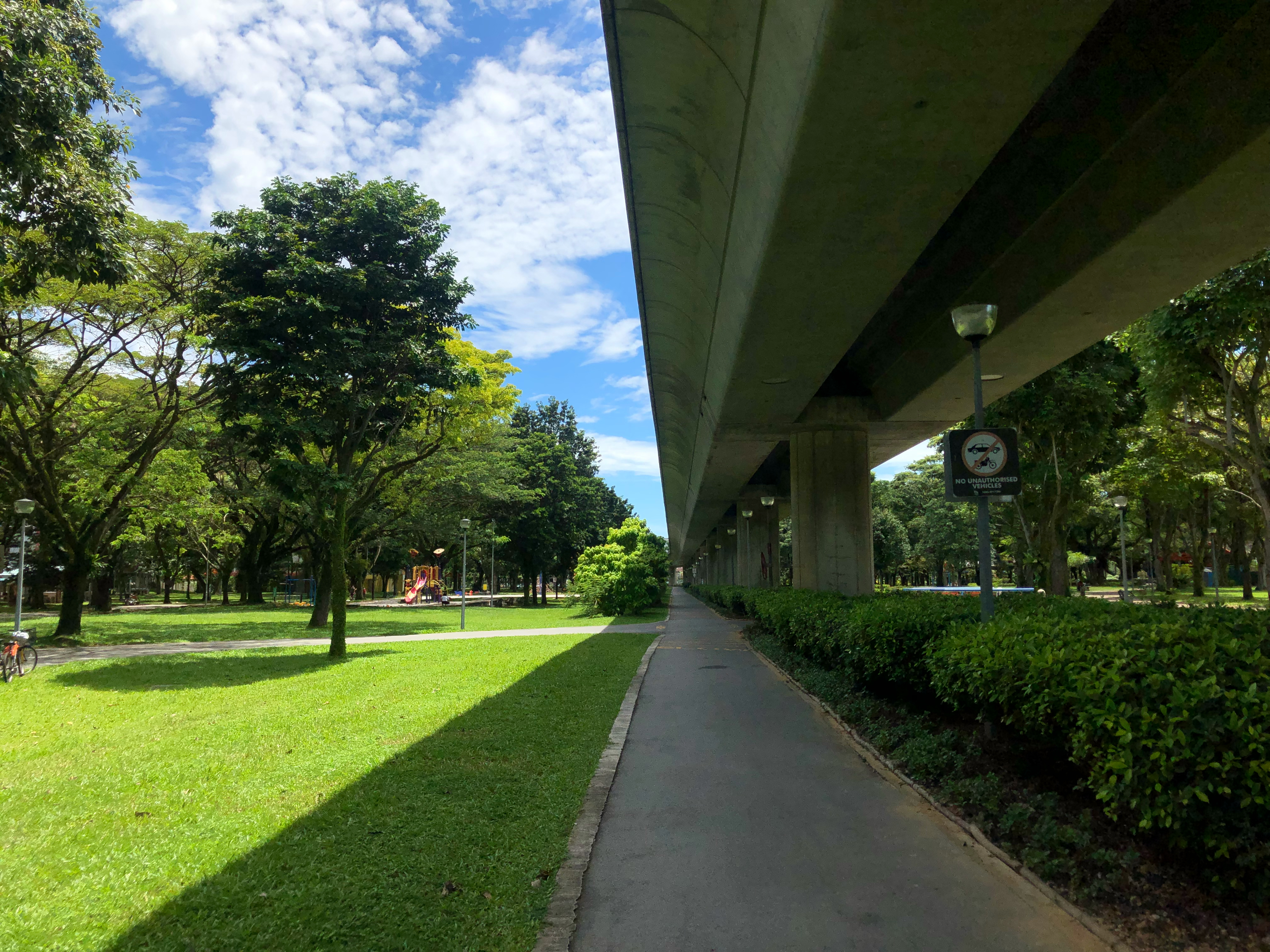
Sun Plaza Park

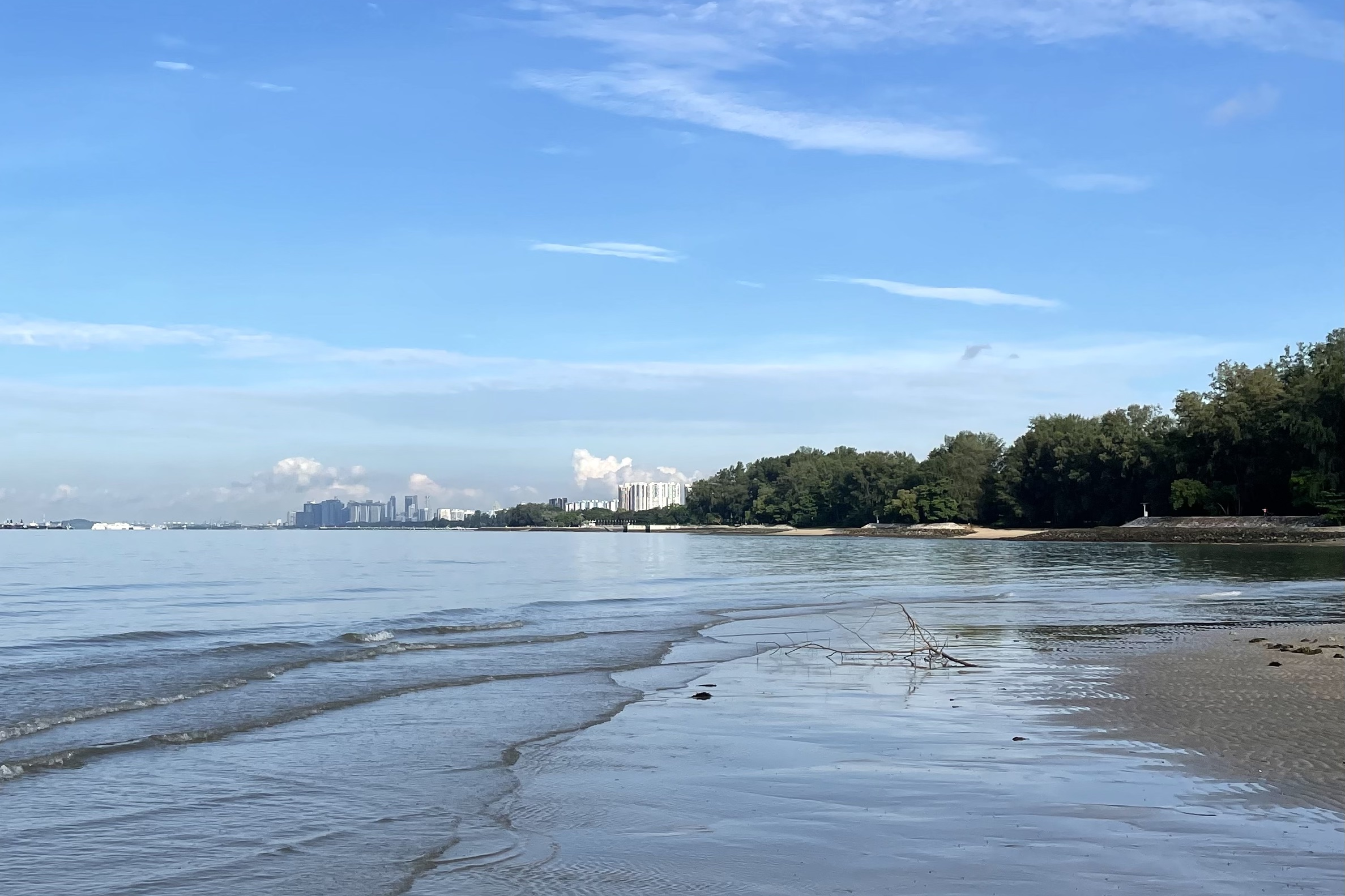
Zone H of East Coast Park

There are three main parks in Tampines New Town. Sun Plaza Park, located at Tampines Avenue 7 and 9, is one of the first parks in Tampines and previously featured a crocodile-shaped playground in the 1990s. Tampines Eco Green, one of NPark's few nature parks, is 36.5 hectares and located northeast of Sun Plaza Park. Home to over 75 species of birds, Tampines Eco Green remains largely preserved in its existing ecological state, with marshlands, secondary forests and freshwater ponds. Tampines Boulevard Park stretches from Tampines Avenue 9 to the future Tampines North MRT station, and forms the spine of Tampines North. These three parks are adjacent to each other and interconnected by footpaths and cycling paths.

The former Tampines Bike Park, was located west of Tampines Avenue 12, at the current site of Tampines Boulevard Park. Managed by Sport Singapore, it had the only BMX track in Singapore and a 13km-long mountain bike trail. An estimated 2,600 riders visited the park each month. In 2010, Tampines Bike Park hosted BMW events during the 2010 Summer Youth Olympics. It officially closed on 17 September 2014, to make way for housing and future developments in Tampines North.

There are other parks in Tampines outside the New Town. Changi Business Park Garden is one of them, serving employees in the area. It runs through the centre of the business park, with The Signature building to its south. There are two large ponds and an amphitheatre in the garden.

Zone H of East Coast Park features the only beach in Tampines. Located just south of the National Service Resort & Country Club (NSRCC), the beach in this zone can extend up to 100 metres out to sea during extreme low tides. East Coast Park offers residents an uninterrupted cycling path to the Central Business District (CBD). It also connects to Changi Airport to its northeast.

=== Community parks and nature ways ===
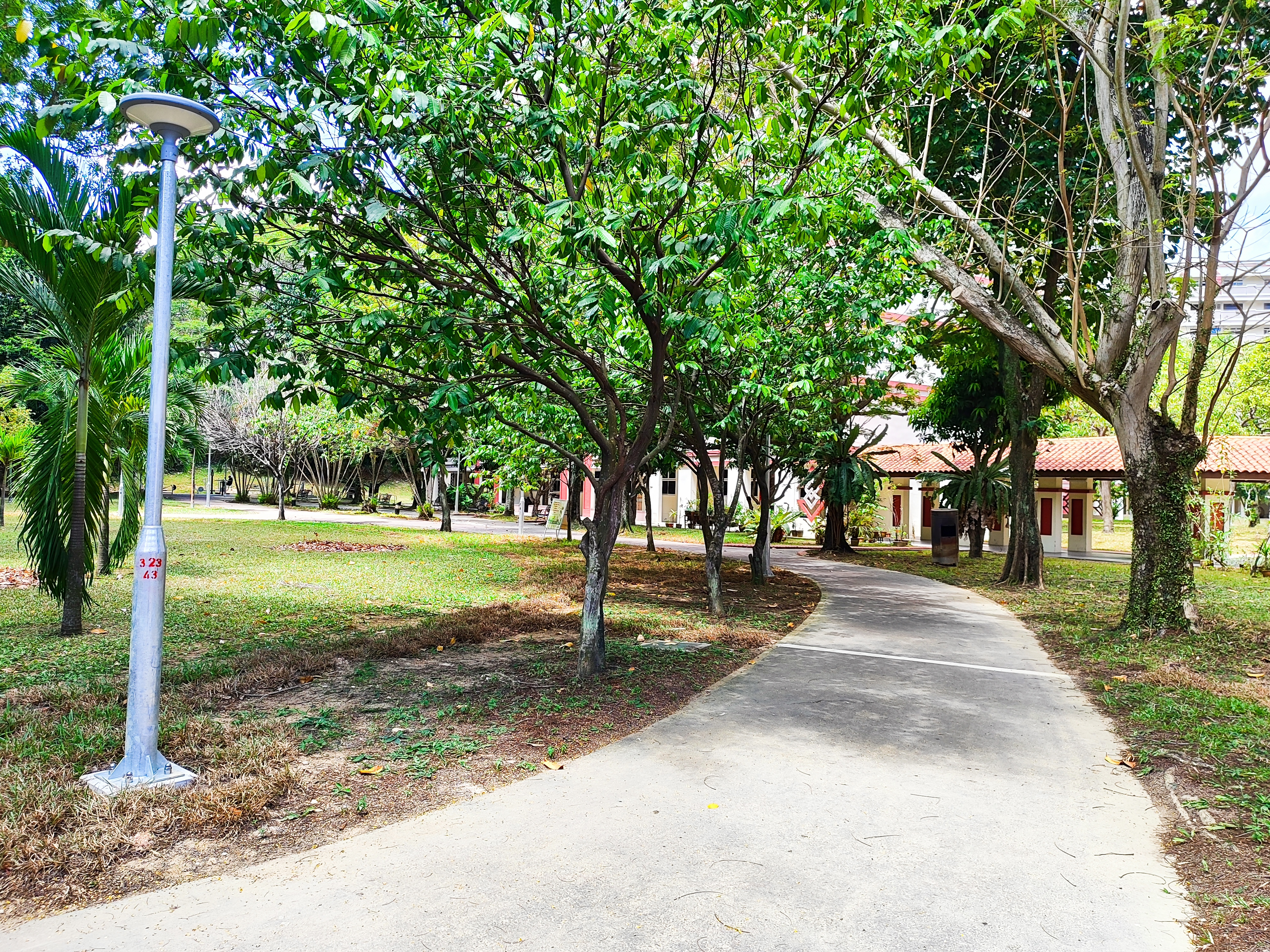
Tampines Tree Park

The other parks in Tampines New Town are mainly community parks — Tampines North Park, Tampines Leisure Park, Tampines Central Park, Tampines Park, Festival Park, Tampines Green, Tampines Tree Garden, and some neighbourhood parks. These small parks serve as outdoor spaces for residents to engage in exercise activities near their homes. Occasionally, community-related events are held at Festival Park. They also serve as nodes of the Tampines Nature Way.

Tampines Nature Way, characterised by its vegetation of trees and shrubs, is designed to mimic natural forest ecosystems. One of many nature ways in Singapore, it serves as a vital corridor for wildlife, like including birds and butterflies, to move between green spaces. Tampines Nature Way connects Tampines Eco Green, Bedok Reservoir and Pasir Ris Park, which have rich biodiversity, to the urban areas in Tampines. This also fosters a deeper appreciation of Singapore's City in Nature initiative.

Simei Nature Way serves a similar purpose, connecting green spaces in adjacent neighbourhoods. It also connects the extensive Tampines Nature Way to the Upper Changi Nature Way.

In the future, more green spaces will be added in Tampines. According to the URA Masterplan 2019, a plot of land beside the future Tampines GreenQuartz neighbourhood in Tampines West has been earmarked for a future community park.

=== Park connector ===
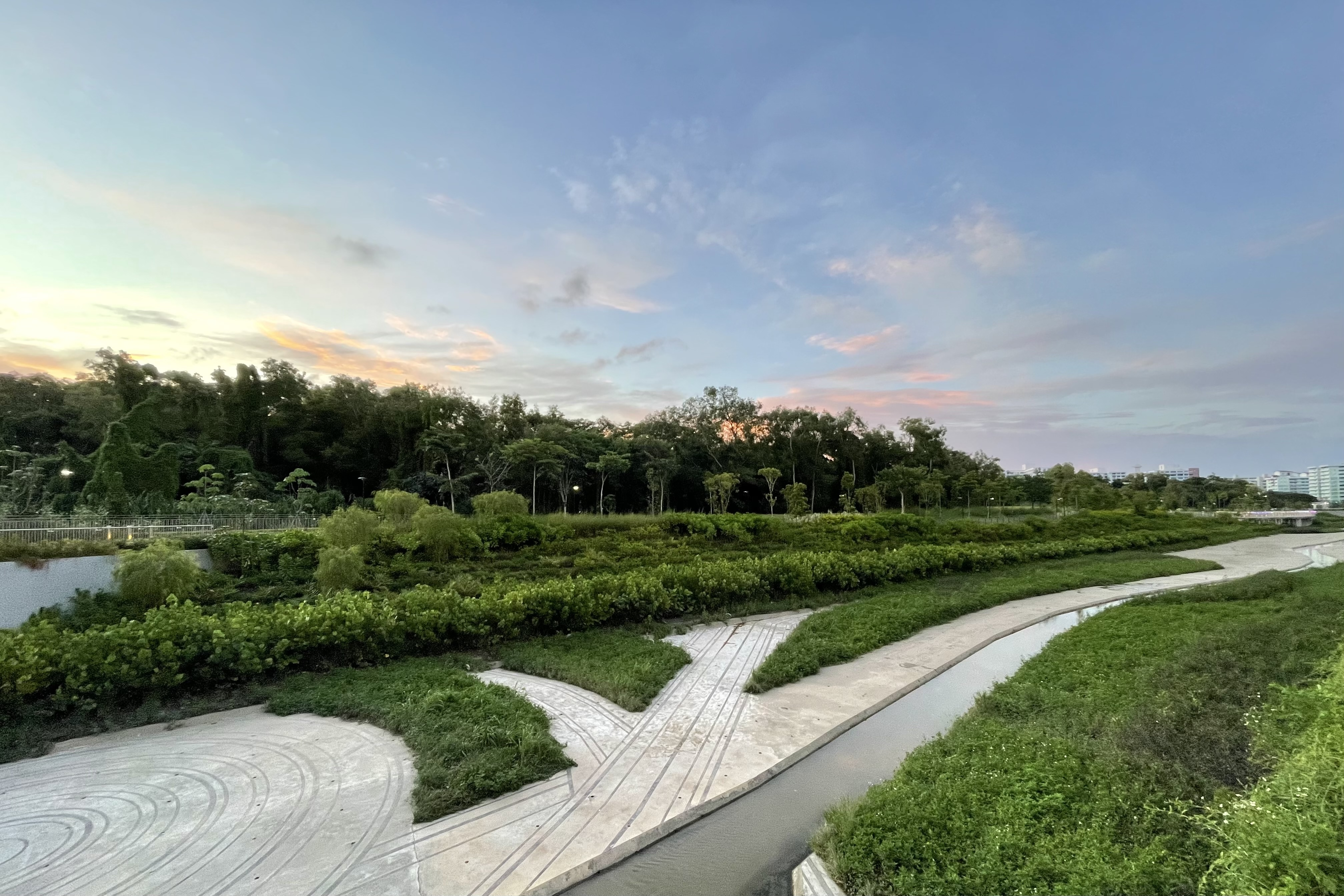
Sungei Tampines after naturalisation project by PUB

Tampines Park Connector is one of many under the Park Connector Network (PCN) in Singapore that aims to promote cycling and connect parks together with shared-use paths. With a combined length of 7 kilometres, the Tampines Park Connector provides residents with an alternative means of traversing the town and visiting other parks in Singapore.

The northeastern section of Tampines Park Connector runs along Sungei Tampines. Between 2018 and 2022, the concrete canal was rebuilt into a naturalised waterway under a contract by PUB, marking the third project of its kind in Singapore. The project, which cost S$48.827 million, features lookout decks on both sides, allowing visitors to experience the waterway up close.

=== Undesignated park ===
On the outskirts of Tampines lies an undesignated park, Tampines Quarry Park. It used to be a sand quarry in the early to mid-1900s, to support the development boom in the 20th century. Rainwater has since filled the quarry. It is not equipped with any facilities, but this park still remains popular among nearby residents and off-road cycling enthusiasts. As it is hidden behind lush greenery, there are no signs or entrances to the park, though there are hidden pathways to enter.

== Transport ==
=== Road network ===
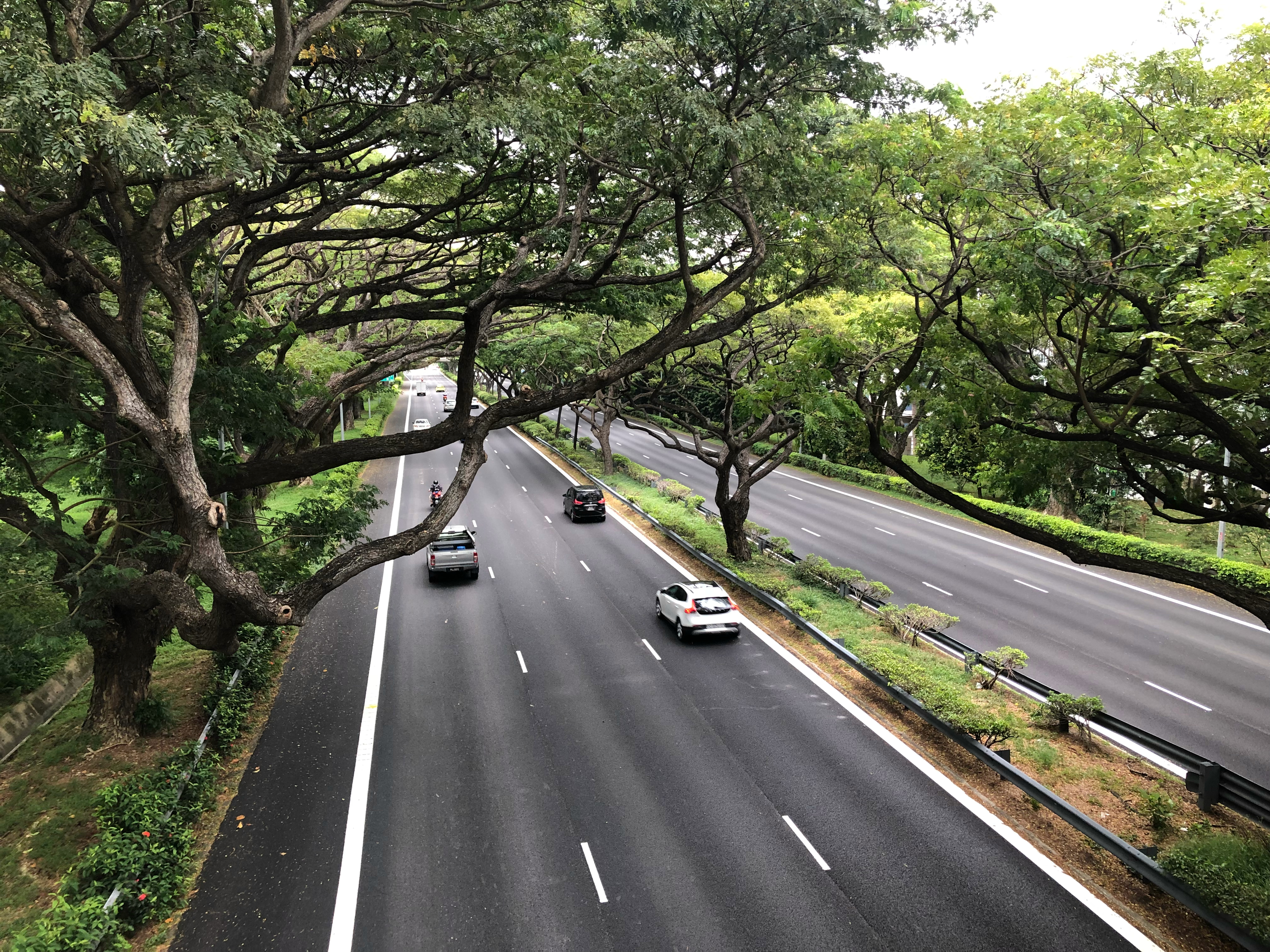
Section of the Pan-Island Expressway (PIE) within Tampines

Three expressways, namely the Pan-Island Expressway, East Coast Parkway and Tampines Expressway provide Tampines with connectivity to other parts of Singapore. Within the town, a network of arterial roads supports efficient intra-town movement.

Notably, Tampines Avenue 10 serves as the eastern end of the Outer Ring Road System, a semi-expressway designed to enhance regional connectivity.

An upcoming addition to the road network is the Changi Northern Corridor, starting near Tampines Avenue 7, which will ease congestion in Tampines East and enhance connectivity to Loyang Industrial Estate and Changi Airfreight Centre.

=== Mass Rapid Transit ===
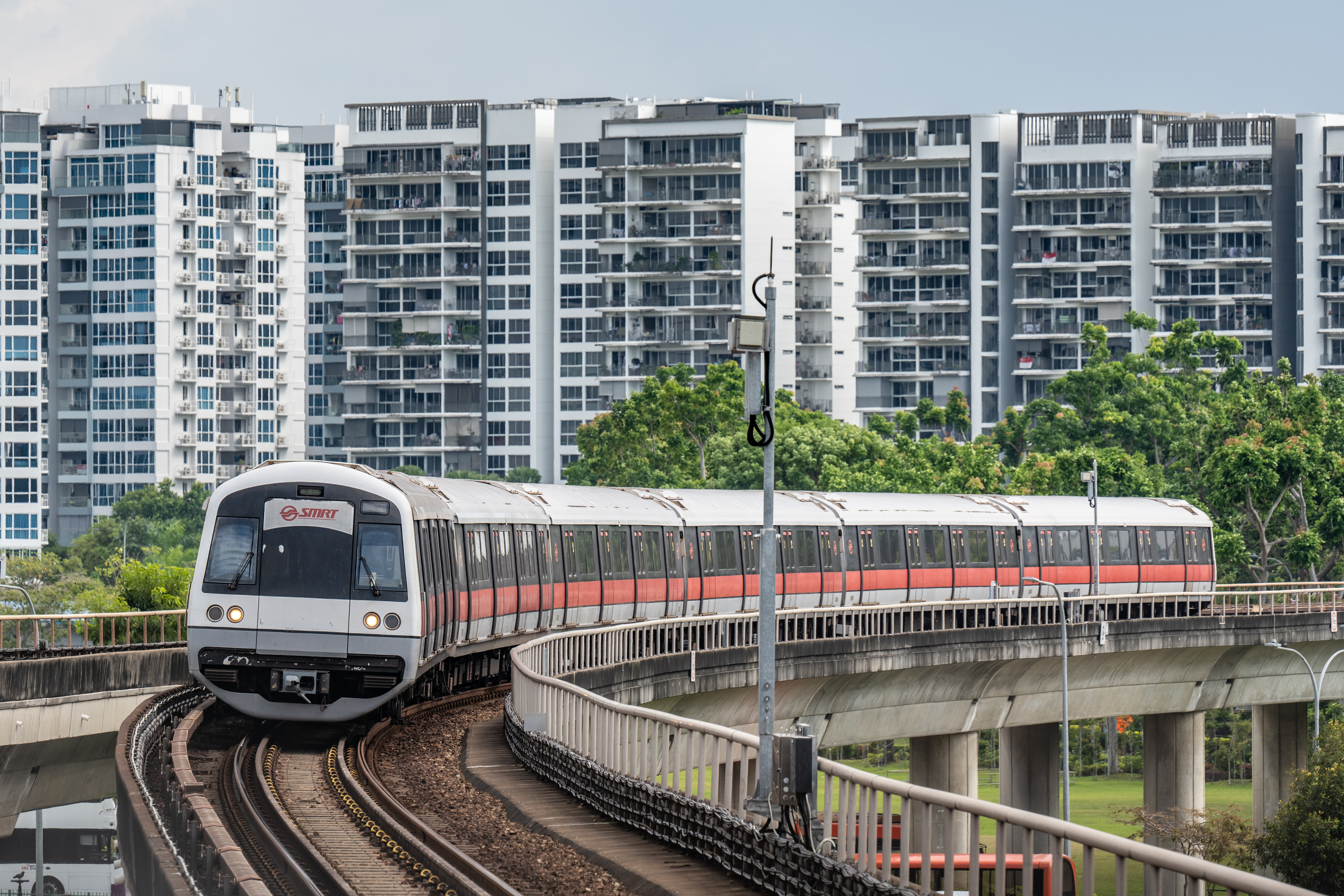
A C751B train in Tampines Central

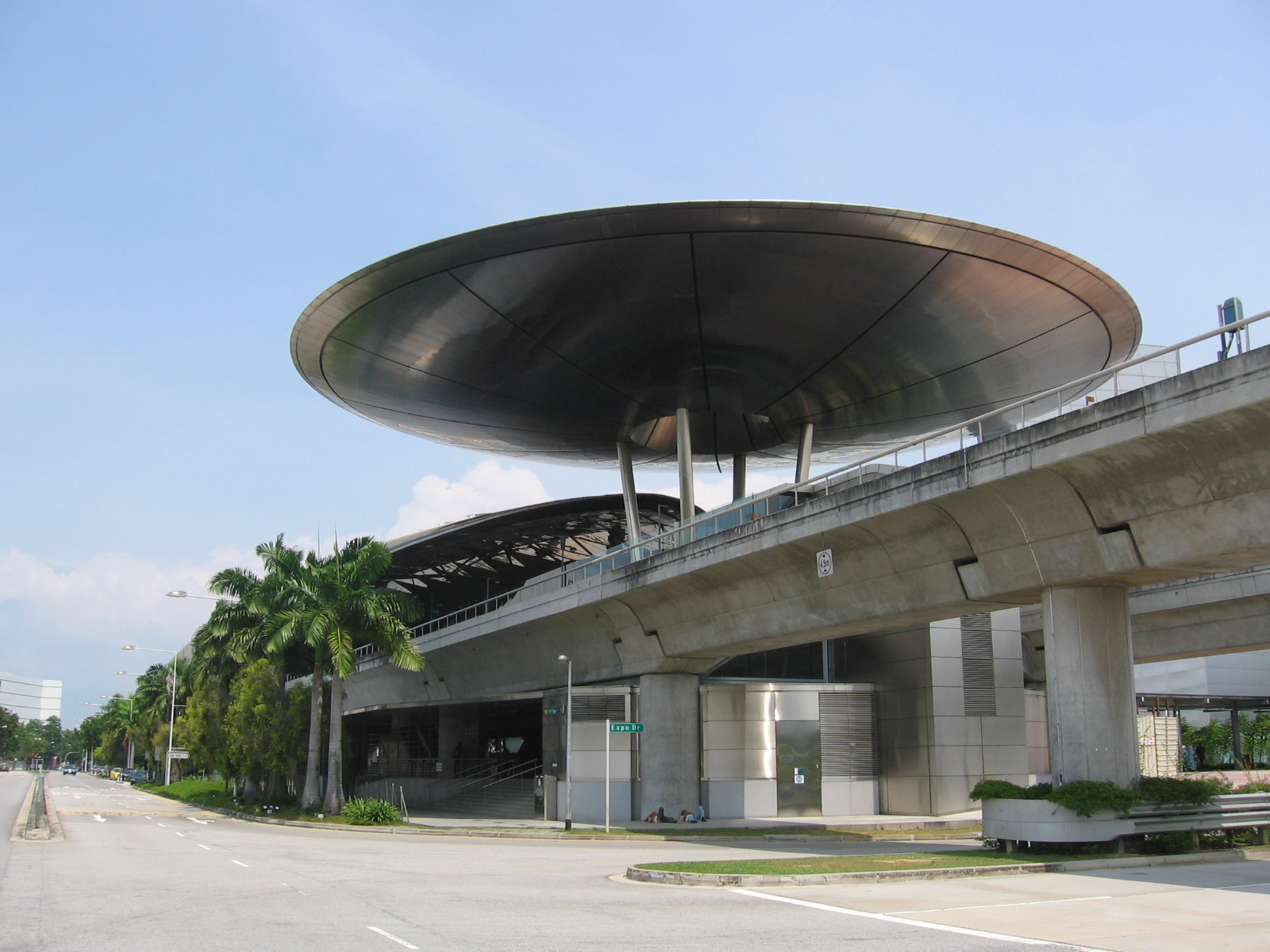
Expo MRT station

There are currently six MRT stations that serve the planning area across two lines, the East West line and Downtown line. Both lines have two interchange stations at Tampines MRT station and Expo MRT station on the Changi Airport Branch line which will be converted into the Thomson–East Coast line in future. The stations of the Downtown line were opened on 21 October 2017 as part of DTL3. The six stations are:

- EW2 DT32 Tampines
- EW3 Simei
- DT31 Tampines West
- DT33 Tampines East
- DT34 Upper Changi
- DT35 CG1 Expo (until mid-2030s)
- DT35 TE34 Expo (from mid-2030s)
- DT36 Xilin (future)
- CR6 Tampines North (future)

Xilin MRT station is a future underground station as part of the DTL3 extension, which will be completed in 2026, in tandem with Stage 5 of the Thomson–East Coast line.

Tampines North MRT station is another station under construction in Tampines, and will be located in the Tampines North Integrated Transport Hub. It is part of the 29-kilometre Phase 1 of the Cross Island line, which will be operational from 2030.

=== Bus ===
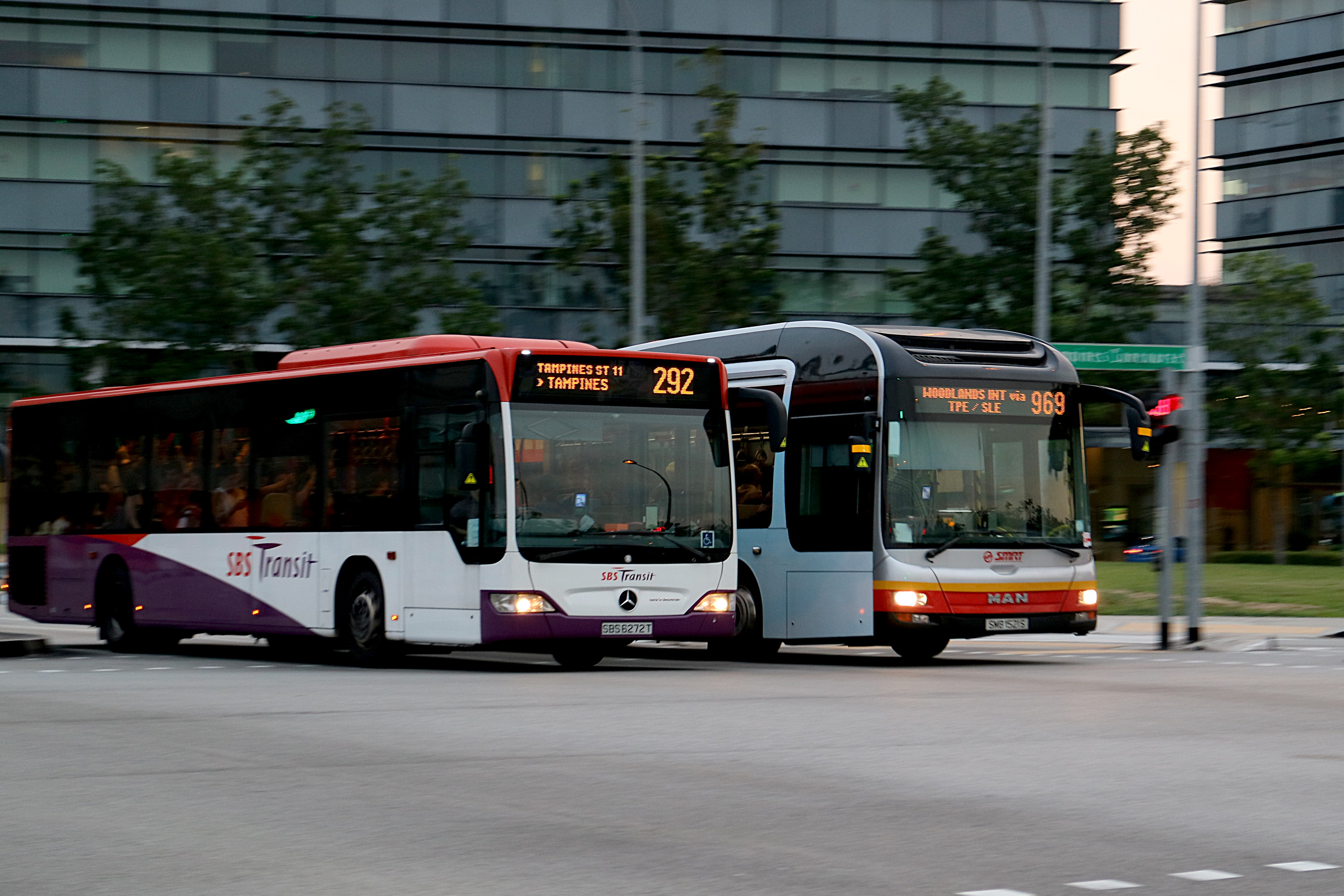
Buses along Tampines Central 1

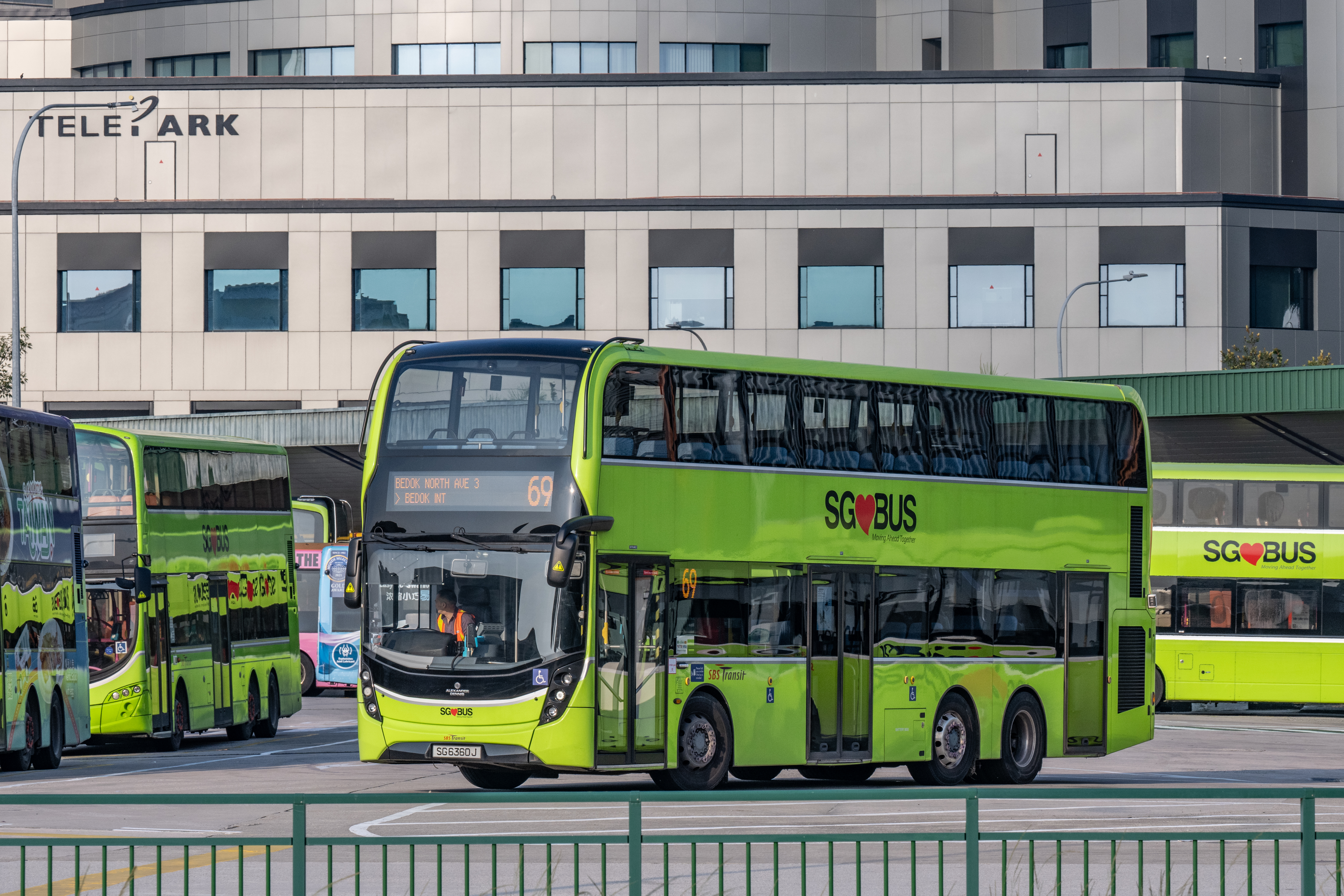
Tampines Bus Interchange

There are three bus interchanges — Tampines Bus Interchange, Tampines North Bus Interchange and Tampines Concourse Bus Interchange. All of them are located in Tampines New Town.

Tampines Bus Interchange is the primary bus interchange serving Tampines New Town in Singapore, operated by Go-Ahead Singapore and owned by the Land Transport Authority. It complements the high-capacity rail network and supports the hub-and-spoke transport model. Tampines Bus Interchange hosts 23 bus services that cater to approximately 325,000 passengers daily, making it the fourth busiest bus interchange in Singapore. The interchange has evolved from the original Tampines Bus Terminal established in 1983, which was later replaced by a larger temporary terminal to accommodate the increasing population and transport demand.

The current Tampines Bus Interchange, located in Tampines Central, began operations in phases starting in November 1987. Built at a cost of S$5 million, it features 85 bus bays and a comprehensive set of trunk and feeder services linking Tampines to the rest of Singapore. The interchange underwent refurbishments in 2008 to become barrier-free, and again in 2017 to add new alighting berths to prevent bus bunching.

Tampines Concourse Bus Interchange opened on 18 December 2016, to manage peak-hour demand and passenger load at the adjacent Tampines Bus Interchange.

Tampines North Bus Interchange opened on 27 November 2022 to serve new residents in Tampines North. It will be redeveloped to be part of the Tampines North Integrated Transport Hub (ITH).

Changi Business Park Bus Terminal is a bus terminal in the northern part of Changi Business Park. The terminal, which opened on 20 December 2015, introduced two new Bus Services Enhancement Programme (BSEP) bus services to enhance transportation options around the Changi Business Park.

== Infrastructure ==
=== Transportation depot ===
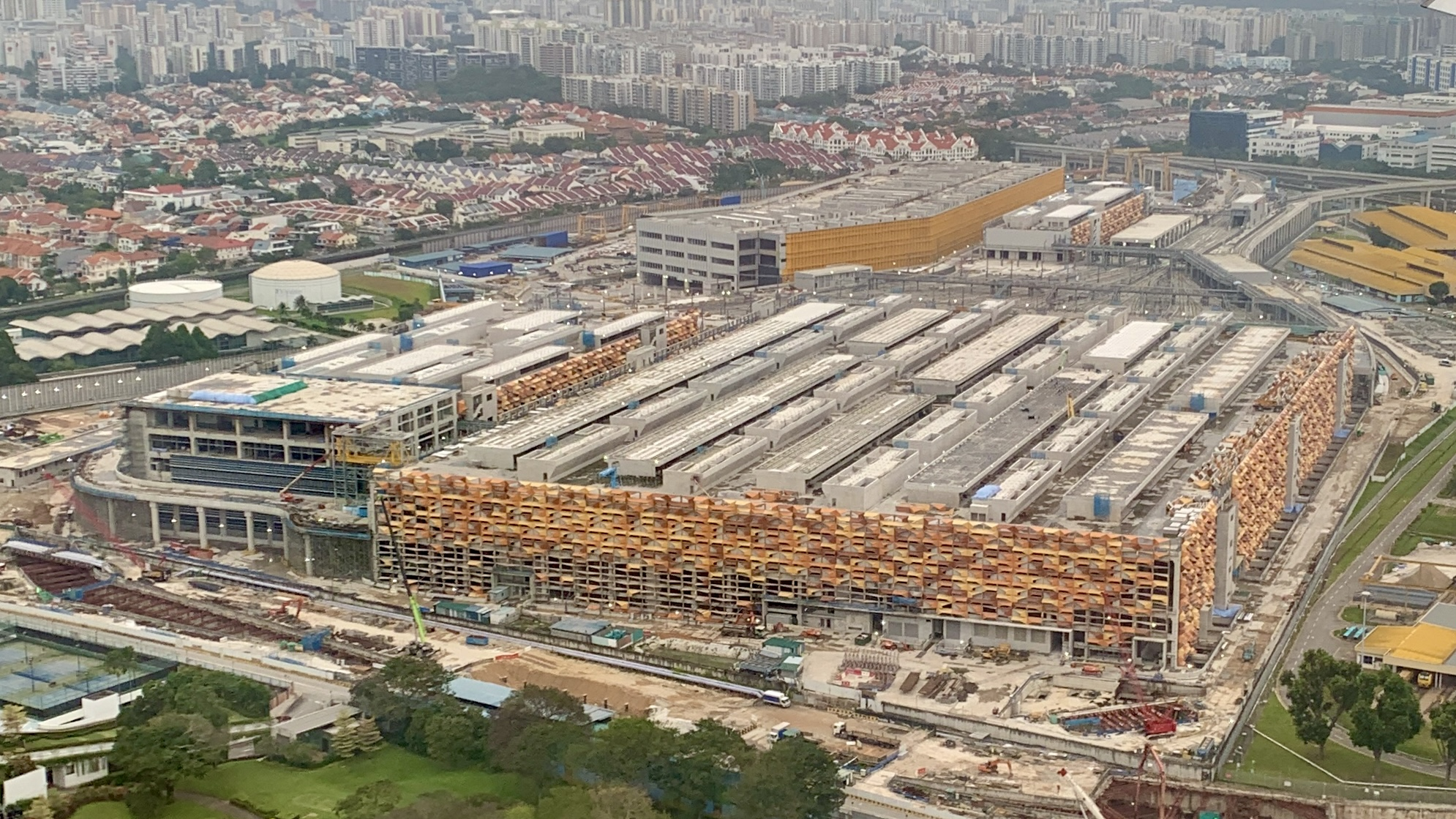
East Coast Integrated Depot under construction in 2024

The East Coast Integrated Depot (ECID) in Xilin serves three MRT lines: the East–West Line, the Downtown Line, and the Thomson–East Coast Line. Located beside the former Changi Depot, it is Singapore's first MRT depot to support three MRT lines and the third to integrate a bus depot. This integrated model was expected to save 44 hectares of land. It accommodates over 200 trains of various sizes and lengths, along with more than 550 buses.

=== District cooling system ===
Tampines is set to become the first town centre in Singapore to implement a district cooling system, a significant milestone announced on 18 April. This innovative Distributed District Cooling (DDC) network will connect seven commercial buildings in Tampines Central. Scheduled to be operational by the first half of 2025, the DDC will utilise the existing cooling systems of these buildings to produce and distribute chilled water through interconnected pipes, thereby providing efficient cooling across the network.

The implementation of the DDC network in Tampines is expected to significantly reduce carbon emissions and achieve substantial energy savings. SP Group and Temasek project that the network will lower carbon emissions by 1,359 tonnes annually, equivalent to removing 1,236 cars from Singapore's roads, and save over 2.8 million kilowatt-hours (kWh) of energy each year, enough to power more than 905 three-room HDB households. By optimising the existing chiller plants and using injection nodes at Century Square, Our Tampines Hub, and Tampines One, the system will enhance cooling efficiency and reduce equipment costs for building owners. This project not only demonstrates the potential for integrating sustainable solutions into existing urban infrastructures but also aligns with Singapore’s broader climate ambitions, contributing to a low-carbon future.

=== Emergency services ===
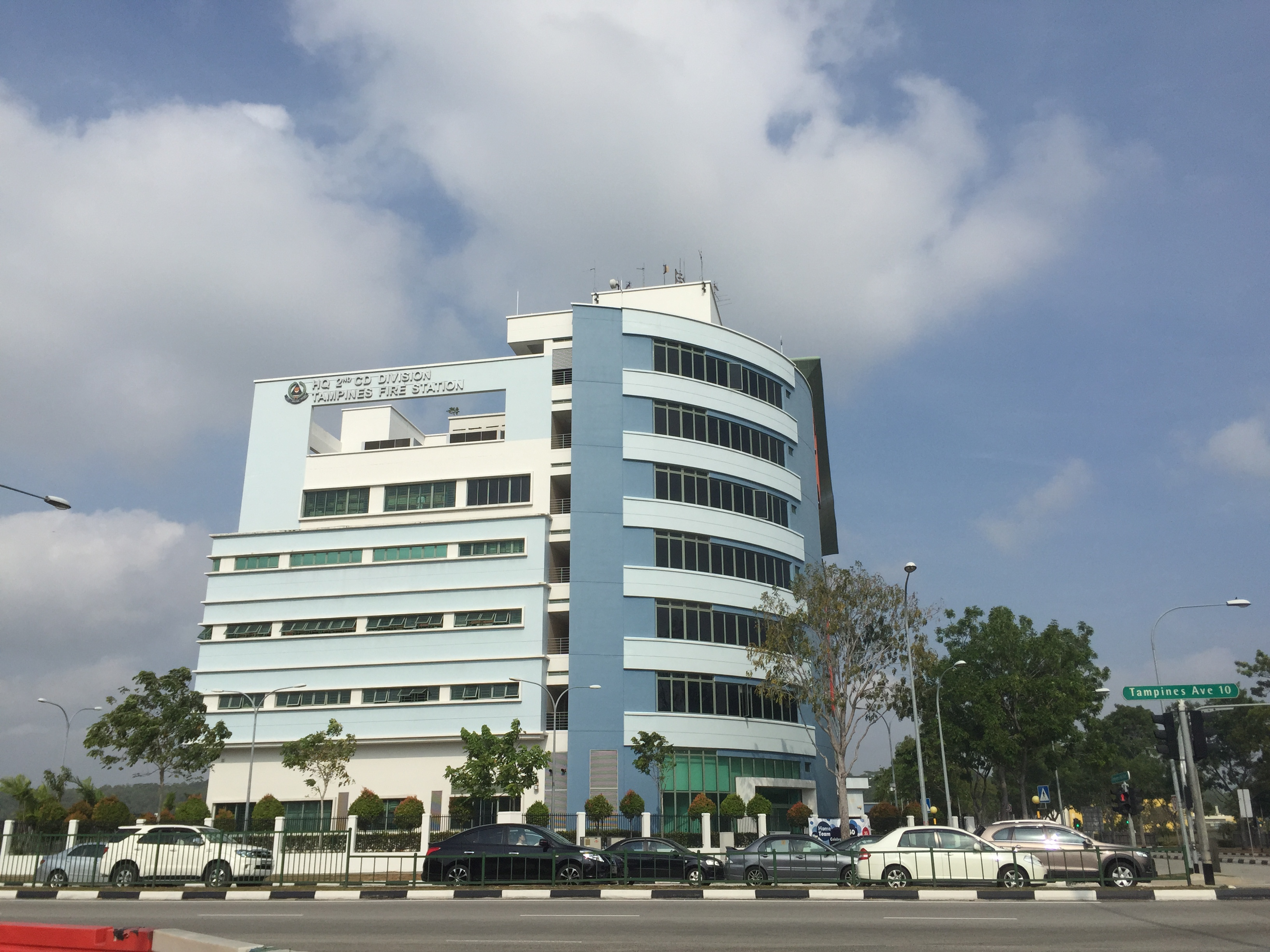
Tampines Fire Station

The 2nd SCDF Division Headquarters, located on the western border of Tampines, has been operational since 26 January 2006. It features an underground command post, which enhances its command and control capabilities during emergencies. A public education centre was also set up to promoting community preparedness. The Tampines Fire Station, co-located with the Division Headquarters, occupies the first two levels of the seven-story building. Staffed by 140 personnel, the fire station's location along the Tampines Avenue 10 thoroughfare allows for rapid response to emergencies in the residential areas of Tampines and Pasir Ris, as well as high-risk premises in the nearby industrial parks.

Tampines Neighbourhood Police Centre (NPC) is a mid-sized police station in Tampines West. It is under the regional command of the Bedok Police Division. Tampines NPC was one of the first NPCs to adopt the new Community Policing System (COPS), which aims to improve the way NPCs work with the community. Tampines East Neighbourhood Police Post (NPP) and Tampines North NPP were also established for residents to access police services with ease, such as submitting police reports and applying for various permits.

=== Cycling town ===
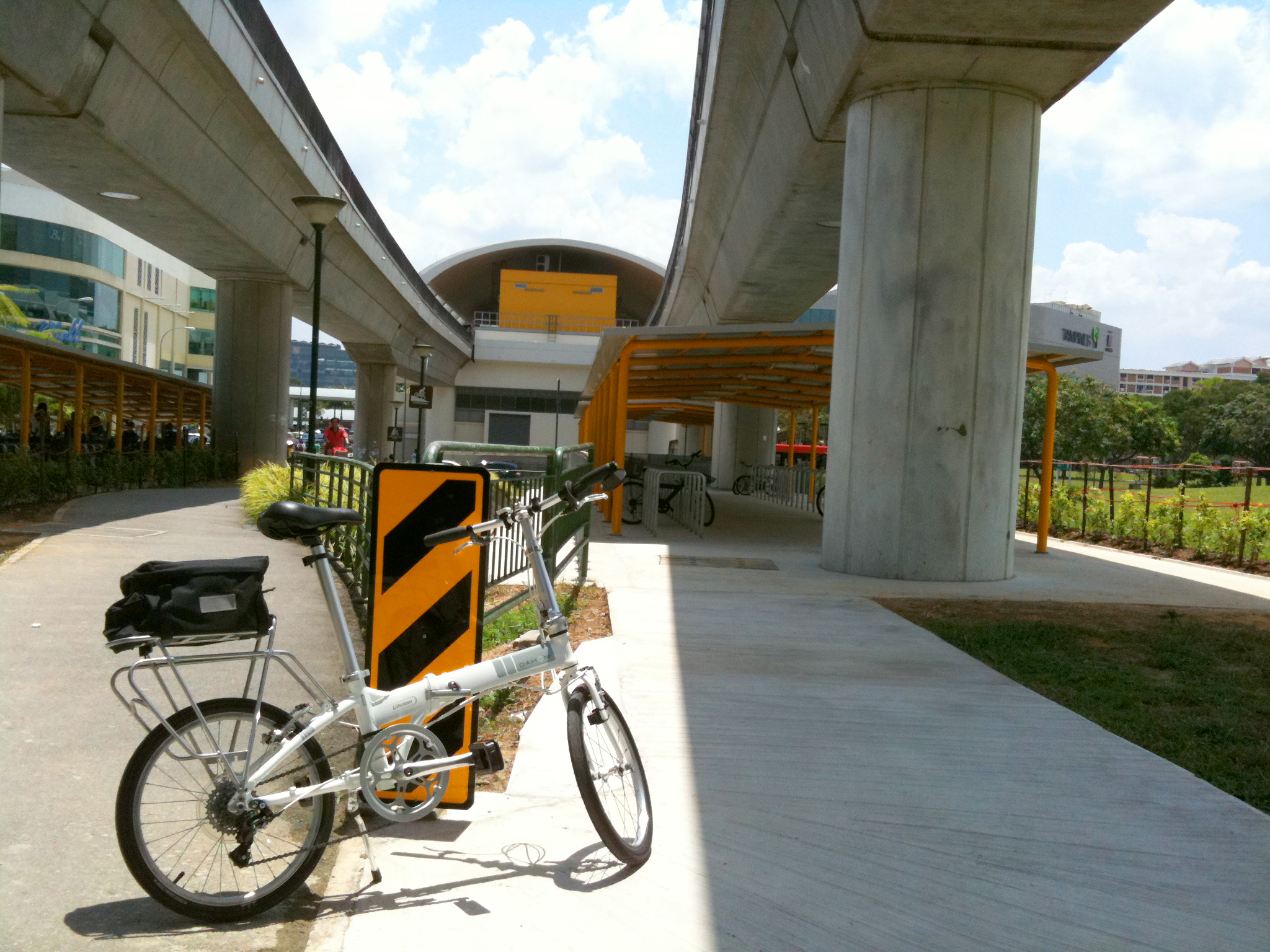
Sheltered bicycle parking at Tampines MRT Station

Tampines is Singapore's pioneering cycling town. It established its first dedicated cycling paths as early as 2010. These paths link residential areas in Tampines, with key amenities such as MRT stations and community centres. In 2017, the Land Transport Authority (LTA) recently announced plans to triple the existing 6.9km cycling path network to about 21km, exceeding the cycling infrastructure in other new towns. Enhancements include widening existing paths, improving bicycle crossings with additional signage, and establishing trunk routes connecting Tampines to neighbouring towns and key employment hubs such as Changi Business Park.

This cycling town project aims to promote cycling as a sustainable mode of transport, and enhance the overall liveability and accessibility of Tampines.
