= Lorong Halus =

- Subzone of Hougang Planning Area

Name transcription(s)
  - Chinese: 罗弄哈鲁士
  - Tamil: லோராங் ஹாலஸ்
- Location of Lorong Halus within Singapore
- Coordinates: 1°22′44″N 103°55′39″E
- Country: Singapore

Lorong Halus is an area in Pasir Ris surrounding a road of the same name. The road leads to industrial buildings and farms in Pasir Ris Farmway. It starts from the Tampines Expressway (TPE) and ends at a pier. There is a road from Lorong Halus that leads to the Lorong Halus Wetland. The wetland treats the water flowing through it, which was a former landfill.

The nearest MRT station to Lorong Halus is Pasir Ris MRT station while the nearest LRT station is Riviera LRT station.

== History ==
Lorong Halus means “Thin/Tiny Lane” in Malay. In the 1970s, Lorong Halus was predominantly a farming area with several Malay rural villages such as Kampong Sungei Blukar and Kampong Teban, ponds and coconut and rubber plantations. A large part of the area had formerly been used as a dumping ground for sewage and refuse. The sewage ground was shut down in the 1980s following the end of the local night soil industry in Singapore at around that time, while the dumping ground was closed down on 31 March 1999, and since then Singapore's waste management system has been modernised and all waste incinerated and sent to Pulau Semakau just off the mainland's southern coast. Today, much of the area has been restored to its original natural state as a coastal wetland open to the general public.

== See also ==
- Pasir Ris
- Tampines Expressway
