= Pasir Ris Public Library =

Public library in Singapore

Coordinates: 1.3728058°N 103.9477791°E

- Location: 1 Pasir Ris Central Street 3, #04-01/06, White Sands, Singapore 518457, Singapore
- Type: Public library
- Established: 6 October 2000; 26 years ago
- Branch of: National Library Board

Pasir Ris Public Library is a public library in Pasir Ris, Singapore, located inside White Sands. It is near Pasir Ris MRT station and Pasir Ris Bus Interchange. It is the first shopping mall library to feature a teenagers’ mezzanine and a space for teenagers, both of which are for reading and leisure.

== History ==
Pasir Ris Community Library was officially opened on 6 October 2000 by Rear Admiral (NS) Teo Chee Hean, then Member of Parliament for Pasir Ris Group Representation Constituency, Minister for Education and Second Minister for Defence. The library serves the residents of Elias estate, Pasir Ris Drive and Pasir Ris Town. Its name was changed to Pasir Ris Public Library in 2008. The library was closed for renovation on 1 March 2015, at the same time when White Sands Shopping Mall underwent major renovation. It was reopened to the public on 28 November that year by Deputy Prime Minister & Coordinating Minister for National Security, Mr Teo Chee Hean. The reopened library has an increased collection size of 125,000 books and 300 magazines titles as well as boasting a new space for teenagers known as the Teens’ Mezzanine, which features doodle walls for users to express themselves and is run by a team of teenage volunteers. These volunteers, mentored by NLB librarians, are also tasked with curating book displays and organising youth programmes.

== Layout ==
Covering an area of 1,986 m^{2}, it contains a children’s section, a parent-child reading zone, an adult collection featuring more books and a quick charge station on level 4 of the mall.

== See also ==
- National Library Board
- List of libraries in Singapore
