= Pasir Ris Town Park =

Park in Singapore

- Location within Singapore
- Type: Park
- Location: Pasir Ris, Singapore
- Coordinates: 1°22′23.9″N 103°57′08.6″E
- Area: 14 hectares (140,000 m^{2})
- Manager: National Parks Board
- Status: Open
- Public transit: EW1 CR5 CP1 Pasir Ris

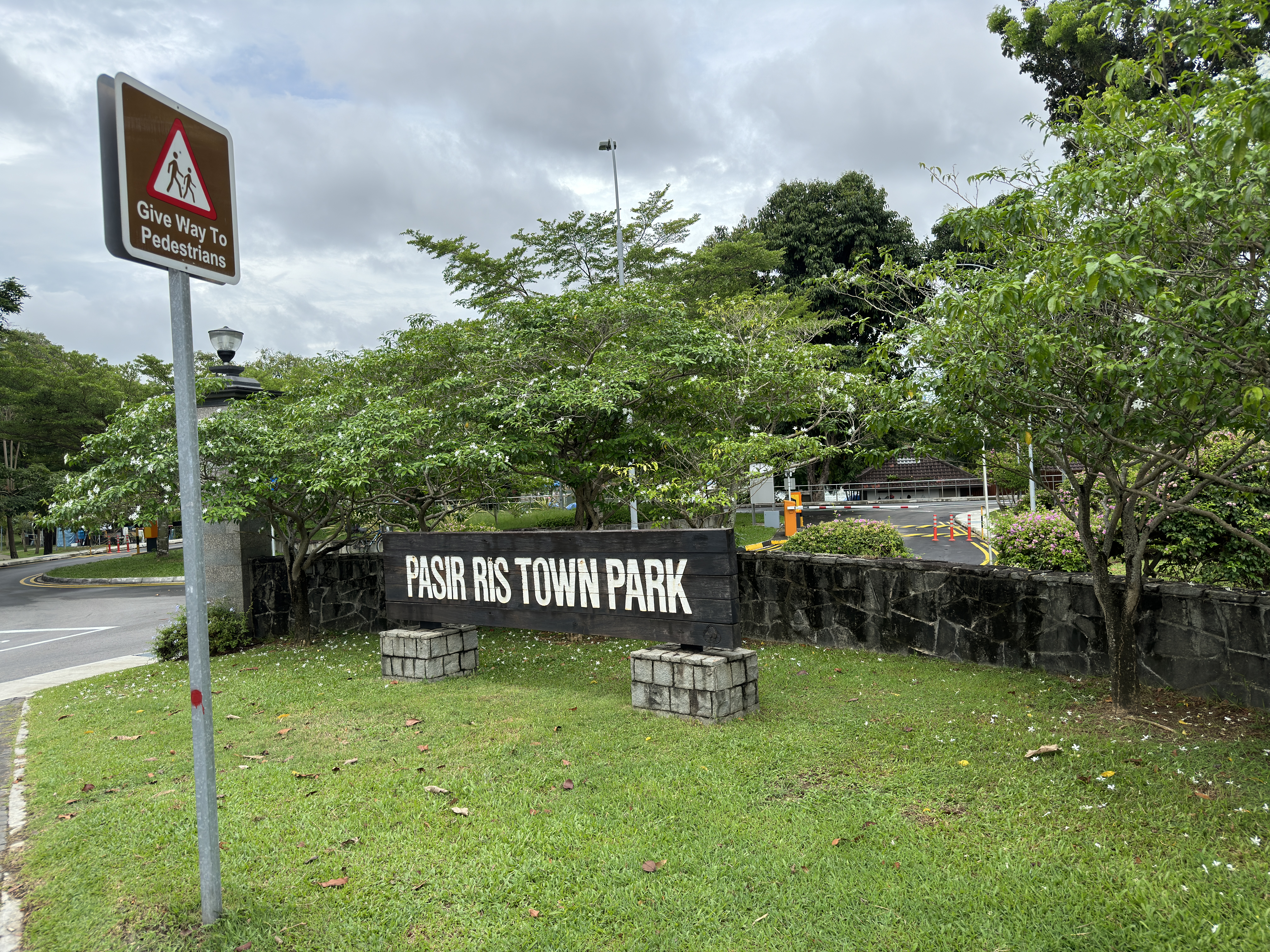

Pasir Ris Town Park is a 14-hectare park located in the residential area of Pasir Ris, Singapore. It features wide open spaces and a large marine pond for fishing. It is the location of Pasir Ris Central Hawker Centre, the second hawker centre in Singapore to be located within a park.

== Attractions ==
A recreational fishing and prawning center provides fishing and prawning with food and beverages sales.

A hawker centre is located within the park and was opened on 25 January 2018. It is the second hawker centre in Singapore to be located within a park after East Coast Lagoon Food Centre. It is managed by NTUC Foodfare and features 42 hawker stalls and 770 seats. The hawker centre is styled as a place that mixes traditional hawker fare with hipster subculture.

== See also ==
- List of Parks in Singapore
