= PRPL =

PRPL may refer to:

- Park Ridge Public Library, a public library in Park Ridge, Illinois, United States
- Pasir Ris Public Library, a public library in Pasir Ris, Singapore
