= Pasir Ris Park =

Park in Singapore

- Sea view from Pasir Ris Park

- Location within Singapore
- Type: Coastal Park
- Location: Pasir Ris, Singapore
- Coordinates: 01°22′53.34″N 103°57′3.24″E
- Area: 70 hectares (700,000 m^{2})
- Opened: 23 August 1986; 40 years ago
- Manager: National Parks Board
- Status: Open

Pasir Ris Park (Chinese: 白沙公园; Malay: Taman Pasir Ris) is a beach park located in the eastern part of Singapore. It covers an area of 70 hectares (170 acres), and was partially built on reclaimed land. Initially planned in the late 1970s to serve people living in the vicinity, the park was designed with the help of two Japanese landscape specialists. Construction began on the park in September 1984, and the park was opened in phases from August 1986 to 1991. The park was further expanded in 2007, with the addition of new areas such as a herb garden.

The park contains campsites, cycling paths, various gardens and barbeque pits. In addition, the park also has a 5.0-hectare (12-acre) mangrove area with a boardwalk.

== Description ==
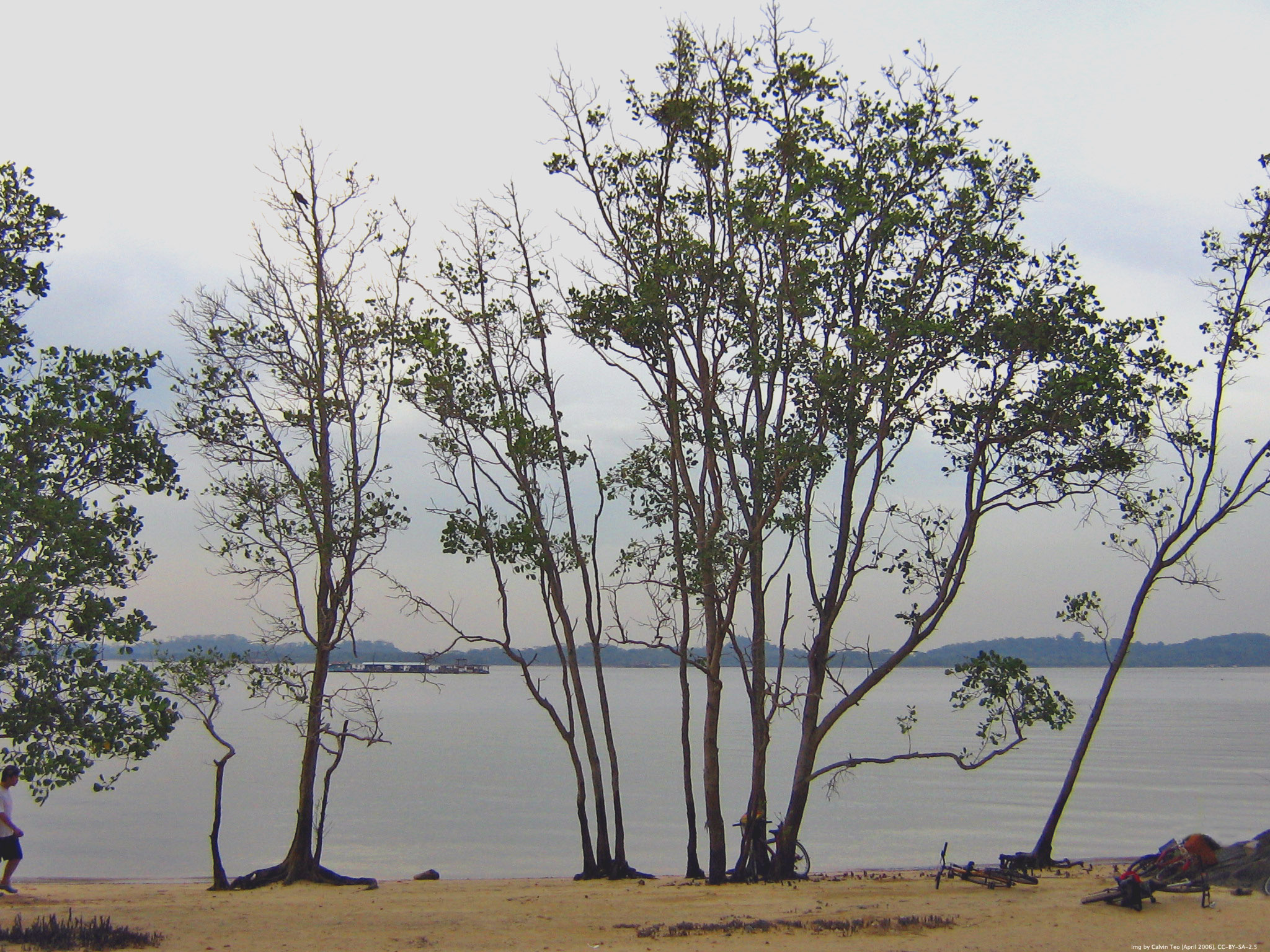
Sunset at Pasir Ris Park

Pasir Ris Park covers an area of 70 hectares (170 acres), and is around 3.2 kilometres (2.0 mi) long. It is bordered by Pasir Ris Road and Jalan Loyang Besar to the south, and faces the sea to the north. The park is divided into four areas, numbered from east to west. These areas are Area 1, east of the Sungei Tampines, Area 2, between the Sungei Tampines and the Sungei Api Api, and Areas 3 and 4, which are west of the Sungei Api Api.

== History ==
=== Initial plans ===
Plans for Pasir Ris Park were first announced in April 1978, with the park intended to serve nearby residents. Initial plans for the park included a large pond, jogging and cycling paths, tree groves and a sports complex. Moreover, two Japanese landscape specialists were roped in to assist in the park's design.

=== Construction ===
The purchase of land for the park had begun earlier in November 1977, and further land purchases were made in 1983. In addition, 44 hectares (110 acres) of land was reclaimed for the sea. Plans for the park were finalised in 1983.

During the construction of Pasir Ris Park, a portion of the beach was raised to eliminate waterlogged soil. To contrast with the flat terrain of the area, earthworks were carried out to create an undulating landscape within the park, and a portion of mangrove swamp at the park's Loyang end was also kept. In December 1984, the Parks and Recreation Department announced that the park would be opened in three stages, each related to the three themes chosen for the park, "Children's Holiday", "Saturday Afternoon" and "Fair Weather Sunday". Of these three themes, construction for the 20-hectare (49-acre) area for "Children's Holiday" had started in September 1984.

The first stage of the park was officially opened on 23 August 1986. This section, based around the theme of "Children's Holiday", was built at a cost of S$500,000, and was intended for children of different age groups, with different types of equipment for each age group. Before the official opening, the park had already attracted crowds, especially children. Work on the 32 hectares (79 acres) Fair Weather Sunday began in 1988. This area, intended for less strenuous activities like strolling, included a lookout point, facilities for picnickers, as well as a mangrove area with wooden boardwalks. Additional facilities, such as a maze, were added to the park by the end of the 1980s and Phase 4, a 7.7-hectare (19-acre) area for large gatherings at the park's western end, was completed by November 1991.

=== The 2000s and 2010s ===
In 2007, the park was expanded at a cost of S$2 million. This expansion added a herb garden, a 1.2 kilometres (0.75 mi) raised wooden walkway in the mangrove, and an open interpretive centre that was intended to complement the mangrove forest.

== Landscape and facilities ==
The facilities at the park include barbeque pits and dining establishments, along with dedicated facilities for cycling and water sports. In addition, there are selected areas for camping, and gardens with culinary and flowering plants.

=== Mangroves ===
During the park's construction, 5 hectares (12 acres) of mangrove was preserved, and another hectare was added in 1989. The mangroves have raised wooden walkways for visitors, along with signage with information on mangrove wildlife. The mangrove has a large number of tree species, ranging from the more common to the endangered. The mangrove area also has a 3-storey tower intended for bird-watching.

== See also ==
- List of parks in Singapore
