= Meridian Secondary School =

- 美廉中学; Sekolah Menengah Meridian

Location
- 31 Pasir Ris Street 51 518901; Pasir Ris; Singapore

Information
- Type: Government/Co-educational
- Motto: Unite to Reach New Heights
- Established: 1999 (as Coral Secondary School); 2017 (as Meridian Secondary School)
- Session: Single Session
- School code: 3076
- Principal: Mr Puah You Kai
- Color: Lime Grey Navy Blue
- Website: meridiansec.moe.edu.sg

Meridian Secondary School is a co-educational government secondary school in Pasir Ris, Singapore. It was formed by a merger between Coral Secondary School and Siglap Secondary School in 2017.

== History ==
=== Coral Secondary School (1999–2016) ===
Coral Secondary School opened in January 1999 with six Secondary One classes: three Express classes, two Normal (Academic) classes, and one Normal (Technical) class. The initial staff comprised 17 teaching staff and eight support staff. The school began its lessons at Siglap Secondary School and moved to its new premises on 15 November 1999. It was officially opened on 19 May 2001 by Education Minister Teo Chee Hean.

The original name of the school in Chinese, Shanhu, is a literal translation of "coral". However, it had been changed to Yunhai, which can be interpreted and written in two versions: the original or the simplified form. The original version literally means cloud and sea. It is believed that corals grow well in the sea with a cloudy sky. The Chinese characters emphasises the importance of tradition and culture as well as the beauty of art and music. Hence, the school has adopted the original version of the interpretation of "coral".

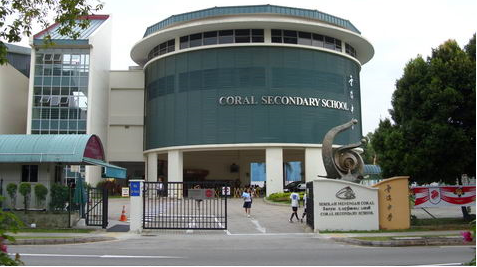
The facade of the former Coral Secondary School.

=== Siglap Secondary School (1955–2016) ===
Siglap Secondary School was Singapore's first co-educational government secondary school. It was also one of the first schools in Singapore to offer Malay-medium secondary classes. The school was founded in 1955 and shifted from its original location of Cheviot Hill in Siglap to its current location of Pasir Ris in the eastern part of Singapore.

In 2000, the school moved from its old campus at Siglap to the new premises at Pasir Ris. The newer campus included upgraded facilities to hold more classes in a morning session and became a single-session school in the same year.

3-day Media Literacy Programme for Secondary 2 Students from Siglap Secondary School, Singapore.

=== Merger as Meridian Secondary School ===
In December 2015, the Ministry of Education announced that due to a lack of demand, Siglap Secondary School would not receive a new cohort of Secondary 1 students in 2016. This was followed by an announcement in March 2016 that Siglap Secondary School would be merged with Coral Secondary School from January 2017 onwards. The school was renamed to Meridian Secondary School with the absorbing of Siglap Secondary School.

== Identity and culture ==
=== Motto ===
The motto of Meridian Secondary School is "Unite to Reach New Heights". This is a reflection of the spirit of the two predecessor schools, Siglap Secondary School (with the motto "Sagex et Audax" (in Latin) which meant Wisdom and Courage) and Coral Secondary School.

=== Uniform ===
The school uniform consists of a white shirt and dark blue pants for boys and a white blouse with dark blue culottes for girls.

== Academic information ==
Being a government secondary school, Meridian Secondary School offers three academic streams, namely the four-year Express course, as well as the Normal Course, comprising Normal (Academic) and Normal (Technical) academic tracks.

=== O Level Express Course ===
The Express Course is a nationwide four-year programme that leads up to the Singapore-Cambridge GCE Ordinary Level examination.

==== Academic subjects ====
The examinable academic subjects for Singapore-Cambridge GCE Ordinary Level offered by the school for upper secondary level (via. streaming in secondary 2 level), as of 2017, are listed below.

Notes:

1. Subjects indicated with ' * ' are mandatory subjects.
2. Subjects indicated with ' ** ' are compulsory with certain classes.
3. Subjects indicated with ' *** ' are compulsory, but elective.
4. All students in Singapore are required to undertake a Mother Tongue Language as an examinable subject, as indicated by ' ^ '.
5. "SPA" in Pure Science subjects refers to the incorporation of School-based Science Practical Assessment, which 20% of the subject result in the national examination are determined by school-based practical examinations, supervised by the Singapore Examinations and Assessment Board. The SPA Assessment has been replaced by one Practical Assessment in the 2018 O Levels.

Sciences	Language & Humanities	Arts & Aesthetics
Additional Mathematics; Mathematics*; Physics; Chemistry**; Biology; Science Bio/Chem (Combined)**; Either combined or pure chem/Phys is compulsory**; Science Chem/Phys (Combined)**	English Language*; English Literature; Mother Tongue Language* ^; Higher Mother Tongue Language; History; Combined Humanities (Social Studies & another Humanities subject at elective level)*; Combined Humanities (SS/Geography)***; Combined Humanities (SS/History)***; Combined Humanities (SS/Literature)***	Art; Design & Technology; Food & Nutrition; Music

=== Normal Course ===
The Normal Course is a nationwide 4-year programme leading to the Singapore-Cambridge GCE Normal Level examination, which runs either the Normal (Academic) curriculum or Normal (Technical) curriculum, abbreviated as N(A) and N(T) respectively.

==== Normal (Academic) Course ====
In the Normal (Academic) course, students offer 5–8 subjects in the Singapore-Cambridge GCE Normal Level examination. Compulsory subjects include:

- English Language
- Mother Tongue Language
- Mathematics
- Combined Humanities

A 5th year leading to the Singapore-Cambridge GCE Ordinary Level examination is available to N(A) students who perform well in their Singapore-Cambridge GCE Normal Level examination. Students can move from one course to another based on their performance and the assessment of the school principal and teachers.

==== Normal (Technical) Course ====
The Normal (Technical) course prepares students for a technical-vocational education at the Institute of Technical Education. Students will offer 5–7 subjects in the Singapore-Cambridge GCE Normal Level examination. The curriculum is tailored towards strengthening students’ proficiency in English and Mathematics. Students take English Language, Mathematics, Basic Mother Tongue and Computer Applications as compulsory subjects.

== Notable alumni ==
=== Coral Secondary School ===
- Justin Chua: Singer; Male Runner-up of Project SuperStar (season 3), Mediacorp TV Channel U

=== Siglap Secondary School ===
- Balaji Sadasivan (1955–2010) : Former Senior Minister of State, (2004–2010); Former Member of the Singapore Parliament, Ang Mo Kio GRC, (2001–2010), Consultant Neurosurgeon.
- Chee Swee Lee: Olympian (Athletics), 1976; Gold medalist, 400 metres, Asian Games, 1974
- Hady Mirza: Winner, Singapore Idol, Season 2
- Low Cheong Kee: Founder and managing director, Home-Fix
- Wee Toon Ouut: Founder, Wee Nam Kee Chicken Rice
- The Siglap Five: Popular pop band in Singapore in the 1960s.
