= Elias MRT station =

Future Mass Rapid Transit station in Singapore

Elias CP2 伊莱雅 இலியாஸ்
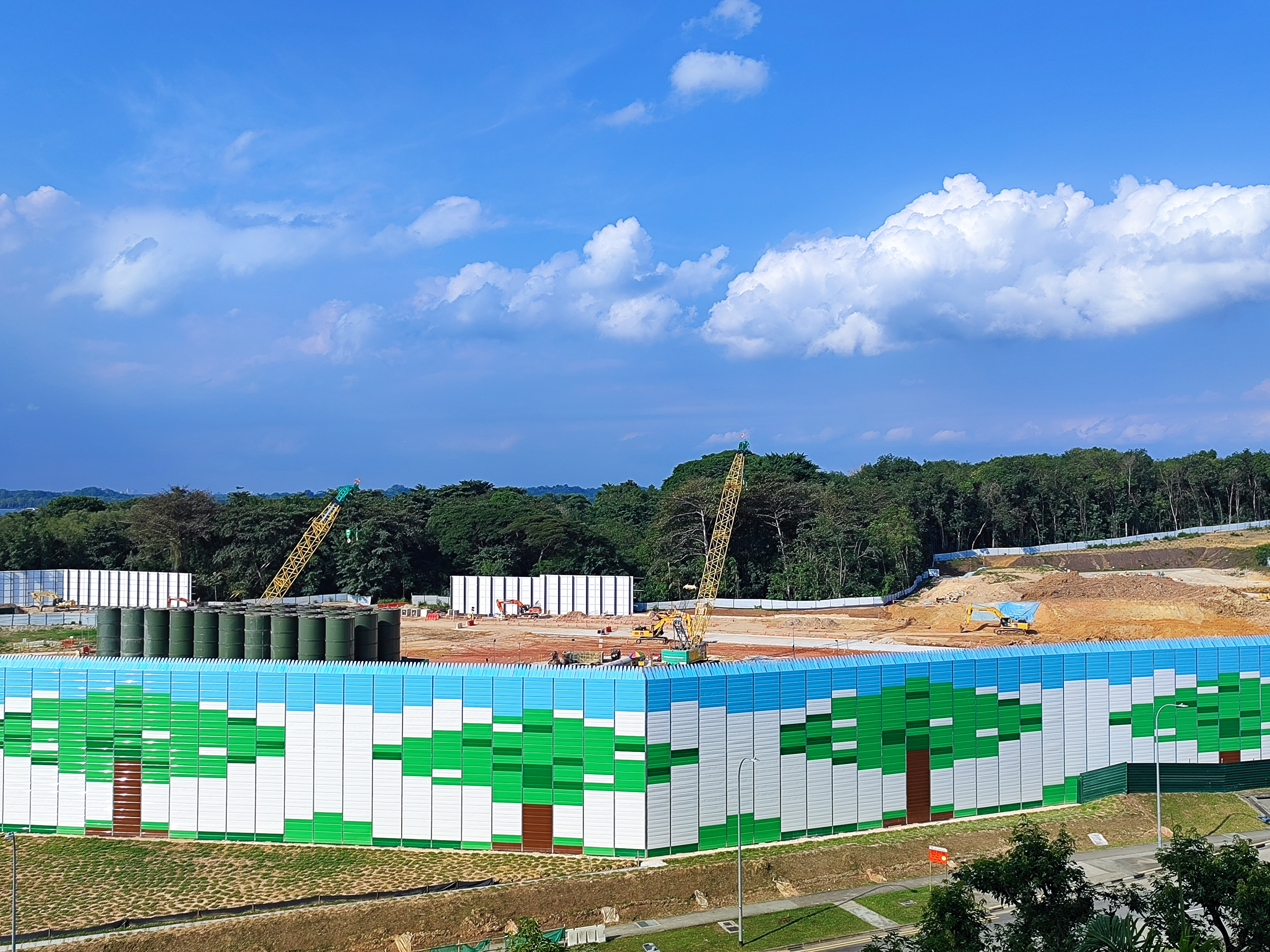
- Elias MRT station construction site

General information
- Coordinates: 01°23′02″N 103°56′17″E
- System: Future Mass Rapid Transit (MRT) station
- Owner: Land Transport Authority
- Line: Cross Island Line
- Platforms: 2 (2 side platforms)
- Tracks: 2
- Connections: Bus, Taxi

Construction
- Structure type: Underground
- Depth: 40 metres (130 ft)
- Accessible: Yes

Other information
- Station code: PRL

History
- Opening: 2032; 6 years' time

Services
Preceding station	Mass Rapid Transit	Following station
Pasir Ris Terminus	Cross Island Line Punggol Extension Future service	Riviera towards Punggol
Location
- Location within Singapore Rail

Elias MRT station (/ɪˈlaɪəs/) is a future underground Mass Rapid Transit station. It is on the Cross Island Line (CRL), and is located in Pasir Ris, Singapore.

This station will be part of a future extension between the Pasir Ris and Punggol stations on the Cross Island Line. Elias MRT station will be situated at the junction of Pasir Ris Drive 10 and Pasir Ris Drive 3, around the military training area that will be cleared by 2022.

== History ==
On 10 March 2020, the Land Transport Authority (LTA) announced that Elias station would be part of the proposed Cross Island line (CRL). The station will be constructed as part of Punggol extension, consisting of four stations between Pasir Ris and Punggol, and was expected to be completed in 2031. However, the restrictions imposed on construction works due to the COVID-19 pandemic has led to delays and the dates were pushed by one year to 2032.

The contract for the design and construction of Elias station and associated tunnels was awarded on 30 January 2023 to a joint venture between CES_SDC Pte. Ltd. (formerly Sembcorp Design and Construction Pte Ltd.) and Chip Eng Seng Contractors Pte Ltd for S$562 million (US$419.4 million). Construction will start in the 2nd quarter of 2023 with an expected completion date of 2032. A roadshow on the station's construction was held on 4 May 2024.
