= Riviera MRT/LRT station =

Light rail station in Singapore

Riviera CP3 – PE4 里维拉 ரிவியாரா
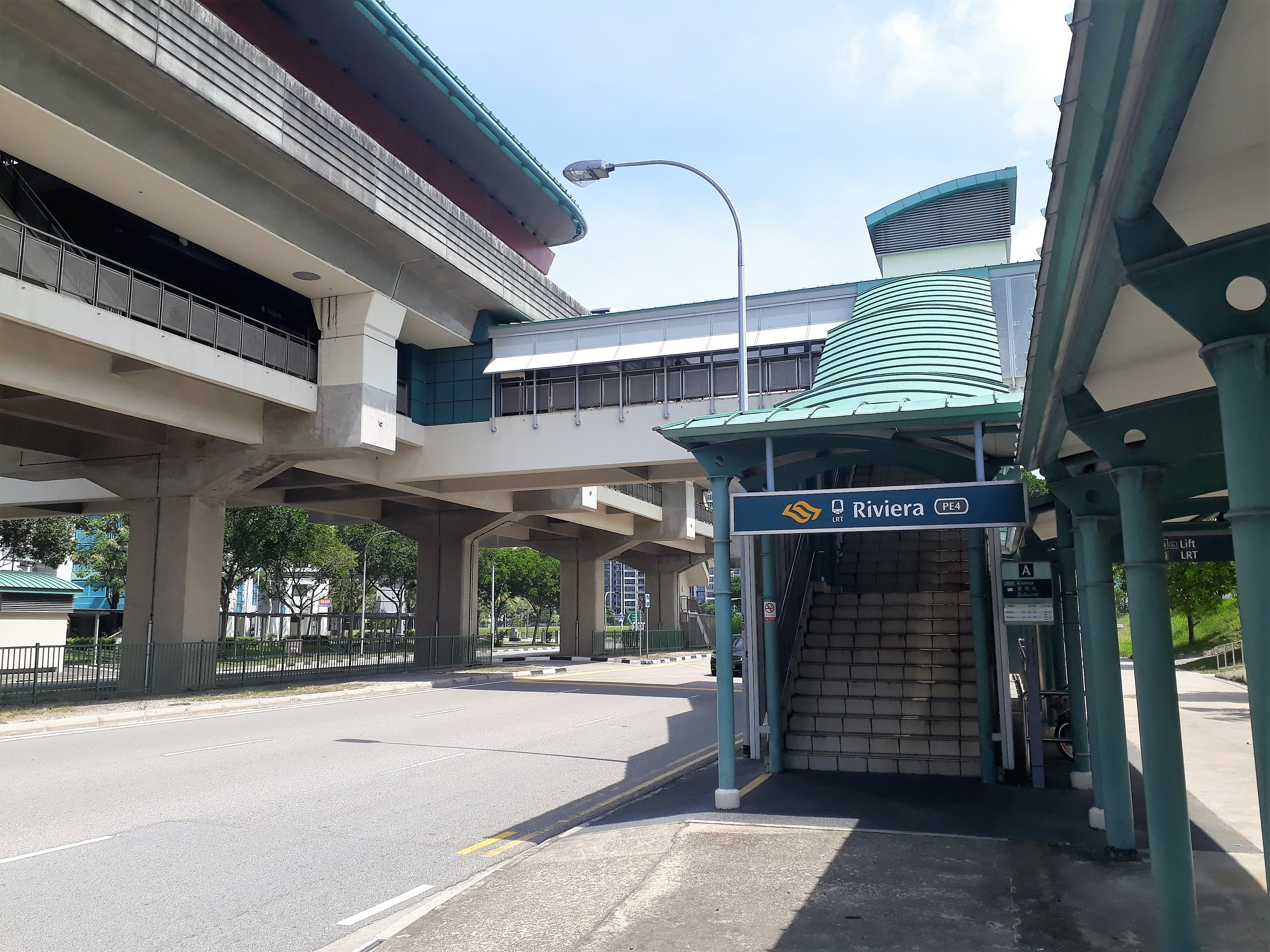
- Exit A of the station

General information
- Location: 40 Punggol East, Singapore 828852 (PGLRT)
- Coordinates: 01°23′40″N 103°54′58″E
- System: Mass Rapid Transit (MRT) / Light Rail Transit (LRT) interchange
- Owner: Land Transport Authority
- Operator: SBS Transit (Punggol LRT)
- Line: Cross Island Line Punggol LRT
- Platforms: 2 (1 island platform) + 2 (2 side platforms) (U/C)
- Tracks: 2
- Connections: Bus, Taxi

Construction
- Structure type: Elevated (Punggol LRT line); Underground (Cross Island Line)
- Platform levels: 1
- Accessible: Yes

Other information
- Station code: RIV

History
- Opened: 29 January 2005; 21 years ago (Punggol LRT line)
- Opening: 2032; 6 years' time (Punggol extension)

Passengers
- June 2024: 1502 per day

Services
| Preceding station | Mass Rapid Transit | Following station |
|---|---|---|
| Elias towards Pasir Ris | Cross Island Line Punggol Extension Future service | Punggol Terminus |
| Preceding station | Light Rail Transit | Following station |
| Coral Edge Clockwise / outer | Punggol LRT East Loop | Kadaloor Anticlockwise / inner |
Location
- Location within Singapore Rail

Riviera LRT station is an elevated Light Rail Transit (LRT) station in Punggol, Singapore. Serving the east loop of the Punggol LRT line (PGLRT), the station is along Punggol East between the junctions of Punggol Central and Punggol Field. Surrounding landmarks include Punggol Joint Temple and Punggol Promenade Riverside Park.

The LRT station opened on 29 January 2005 together with the east loop stations of the PGLRT. In March 2020, it was announced that the station would interchange with the Punggol branch of the Cross Island Line (CRL). The new platforms are expected to be completed by 2032.

== History ==
=== Punggol LRT line ===
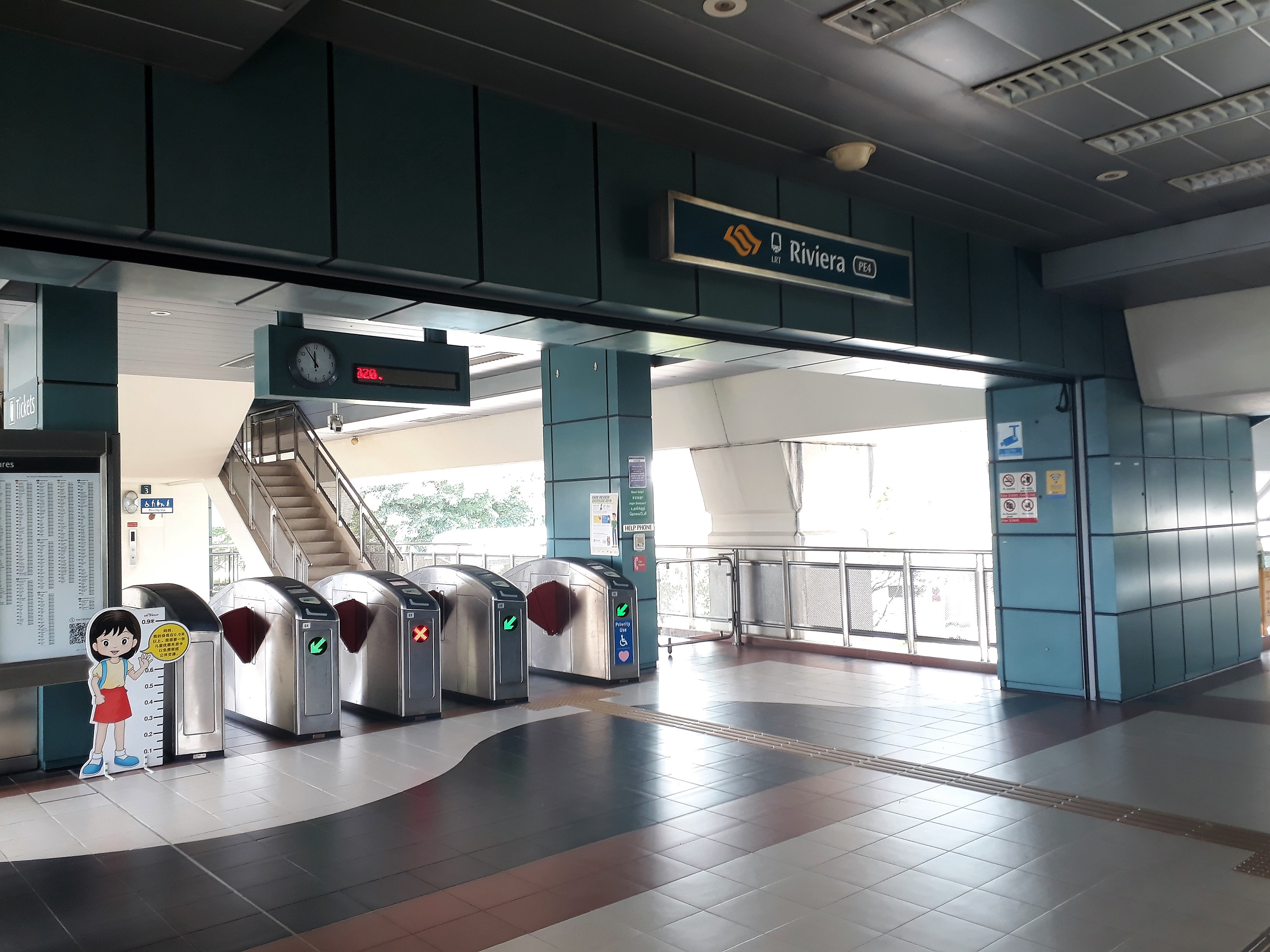
Concourse level

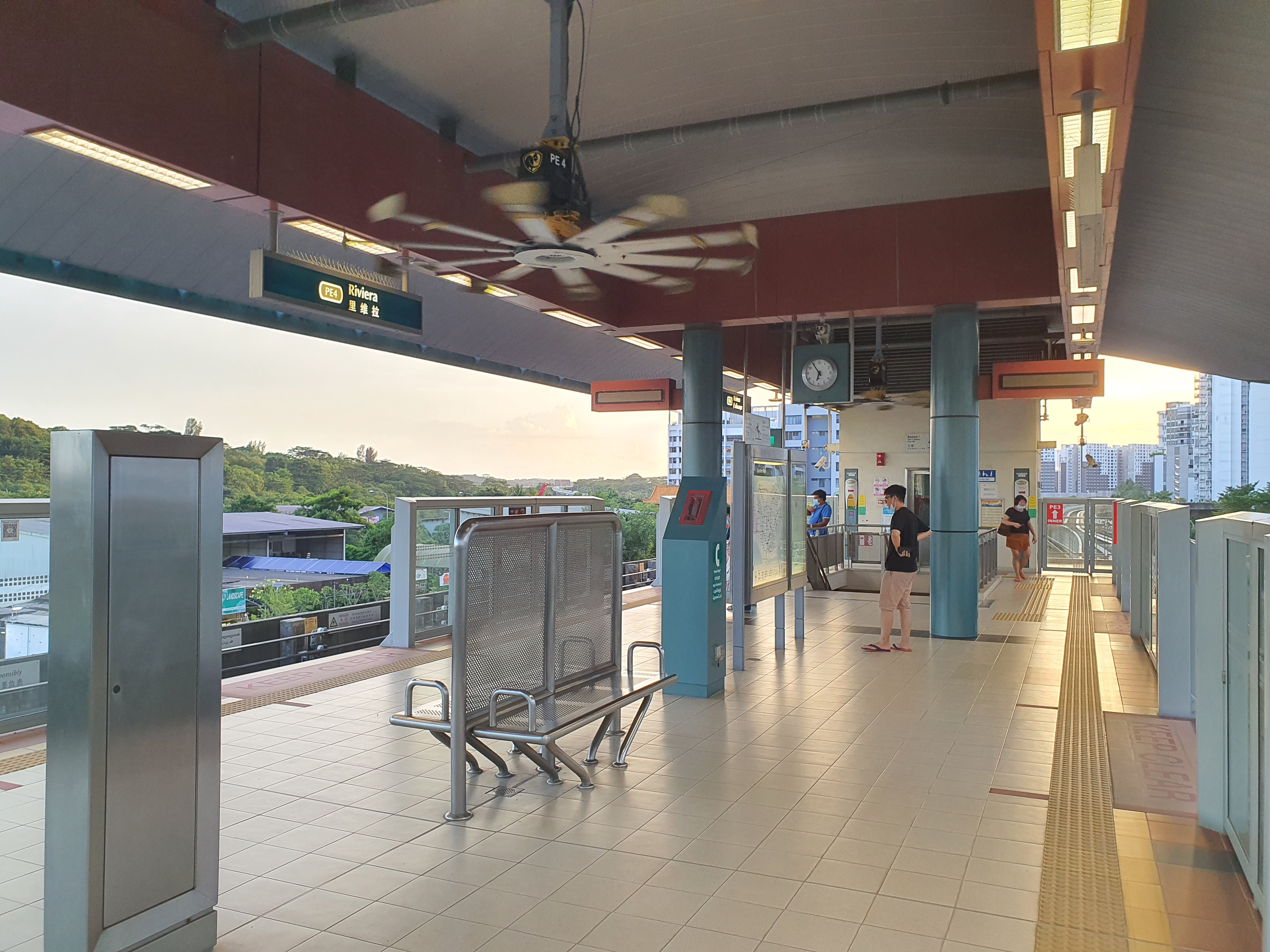
Platform level of the station

The station was first constructed as part of the LRT system serving the Punggol area. The contract for the design and construction of the 13-kilometre (8.1-mile) Punggol LRT system was awarded to a joint venture, comprising Singapore Technologies Industrial Corporation, Mitsubishi Heavy Industries and Mitsubishi Corporation, at S$656 million (US$392 million). (Note: The contract also includes the Sengkang LRT line) The station opened on 29 January 2005 together with the stations of the Punggol LRT line (PGLRT) east loop.

On 9 January 2020, a crack was discovered on one of the plinths between the Riviera and Coral Edge stations. One platform was closed early for urgent maintenance, while operations continued as trains ran at the other platform.

=== Cross Island Line interchange ===
On 10 March 2020, Riviera station was announced to interchange with the Cross Island Line (CRL). The 7.3-kilometre (4.5-mile) CRL Punggol extension, consisting of four stations between the Pasir Ris and Punggol, was expected to be completed in 2031. However, the restrictions imposed on construction works due to the COVID-19 pandemic have led to delays and the dates were pushed by one year to 2032.

The contract for the design and construction of Riviera CRL Station was awarded to a joint venture between Taisei Corporation and China State Construction Engineering Corporation Limited Singapore Branch on 30 September 2022. The S$1.1 billion (US$0.8 billion) project involves the construction of 4.3 kilometres (2.7 miles) of bored tunnels. Construction will start in 2023 with an expected completion date of 2032. On 10 October 2023, the LTA held a groundbreaking ceremony at this station to mark the beginning of CRL Punggol extension construction. Bachy Soletanche Singapore is involved in foundation works for Riviera Station, which includes the installation of Earth Retaining and Stabilising Structures (ERSS) such as diaphragm walls, cross walls, and barrette piles.

== Details ==
The station serves the east loop of the PGLRT and is between the Coral Edge and Kadaloor stations. The official station code is PE4. The station will serve the CRL Punggol branch between the Punggol and Elias stations. Like the rest of the LRT stations, the station has lifts and wider fare gates for wheelchair users and tactile flooring to guide visually impaired commuters through the station.

Named to reflect the seaside theme, the station is located along Punggol East. The station has two entrances to serve various landmarks including Punggol Joint Temple, Punggol NPC and Punggol Promenade Riverside Park.
