= Pasir Ris Bus Interchange =

Bus interchange in Pasir Ris, Singapore

Pasir Ris Bus Interchange 巴西立巴士转换站 Pusat Pertukaran Bas Pasir Ris
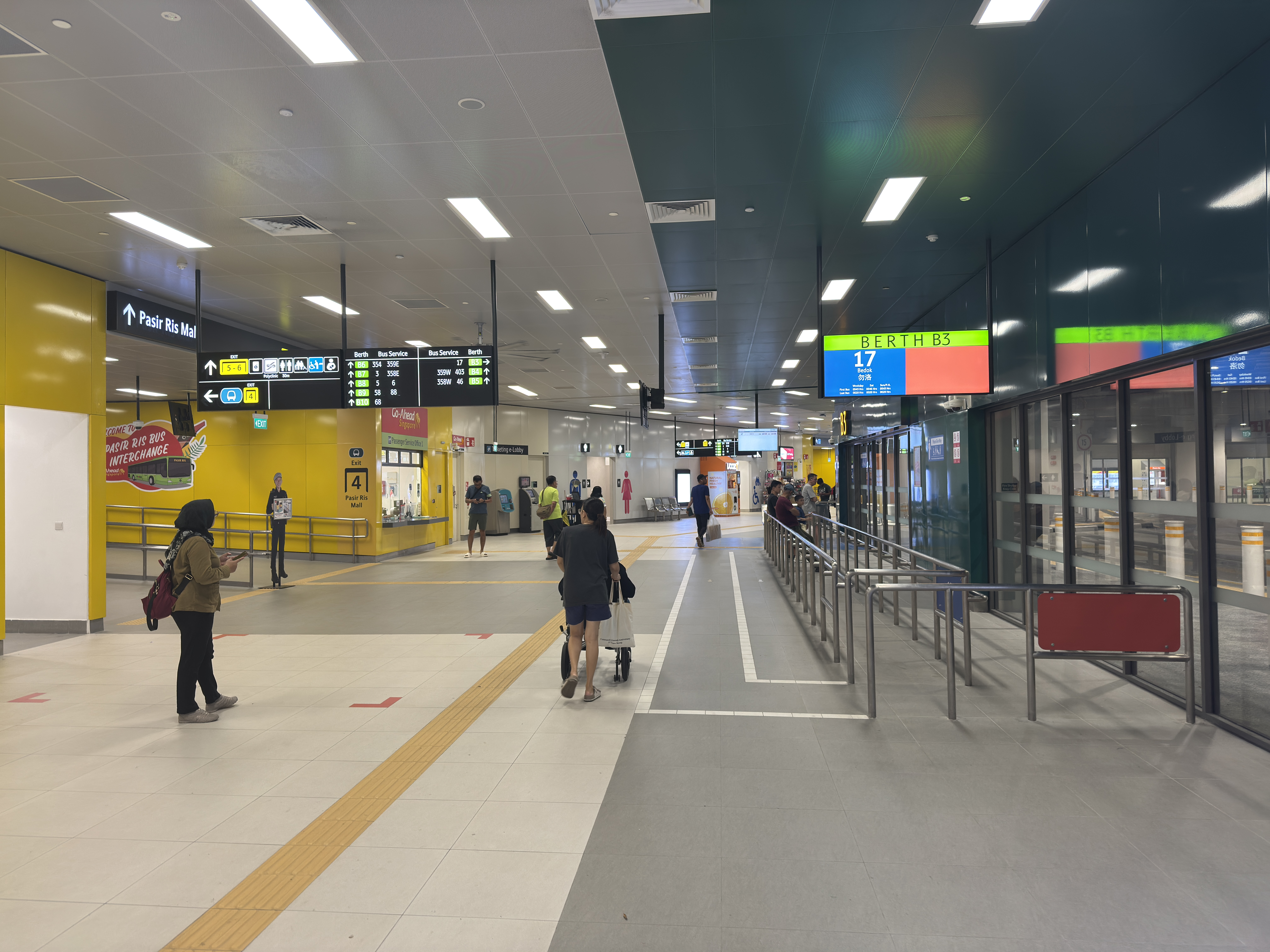
- Interior of Pasir Ris Bus Interchange in August 2025

General information
- Location: 71 Pasir Ris Drive 3, Singapore 519872
- System: Public Bus Interchange
- Owner: Land Transport Authority
- Operator: Go-Ahead Singapore
- Bus routes: Terminating: 16 (12 Go-Ahead Singapore, 5 SBS Transit); En-Route Stop: 1 (1 Go-Ahead Singapore)
- Bus stands: 10 Boarding Berths; 5 Alighting Berths
- Bus operators: Go-Ahead Singapore; SBS Transit
- Connections: EW1 CR5 CP1 Pasir Ris

Construction
- Structure type: At-grade
- Accessible: Accessible alighting/boarding points Accessible public toilets Graduated kerb edges Tactile guidance system

History
- Opened: 10 December 1989; 36 years ago (Old); 3 July 2021; 5 years ago (Reconfigured); 27 April 2025; 18 months ago (Integrated Transport Hub)
- Closed: 26 April 2025; 18 months ago (Old)

Key dates
- 10 December 1989: Commenced operations
- 27 April 2025: Operations transferred to new and air-conditioned bus interchange as Integrated Transport Hub

Pasir Ris Bus Interchange is an air-conditioned bus interchange located at Pasir Ris Town Centre, located inside the Pasir Ris 8 mixed-use development and is integrated with the Pasir Ris Mall. Apart from housing a bus interchange, the mixed-use development comprises a retail mall, condominium, town plaza, polyclinic and childcare facilities. It is located off Pasir Ris Drive 3, adjacent to Pasir Ris MRT station and near White Sands Shopping Centre. It also serves as a pick-up/drop-off point for shuttle buses ferrying NSFs heading to the SAF Ferry Terminal for their shuttle ferry to Pulau Tekong.

== History ==
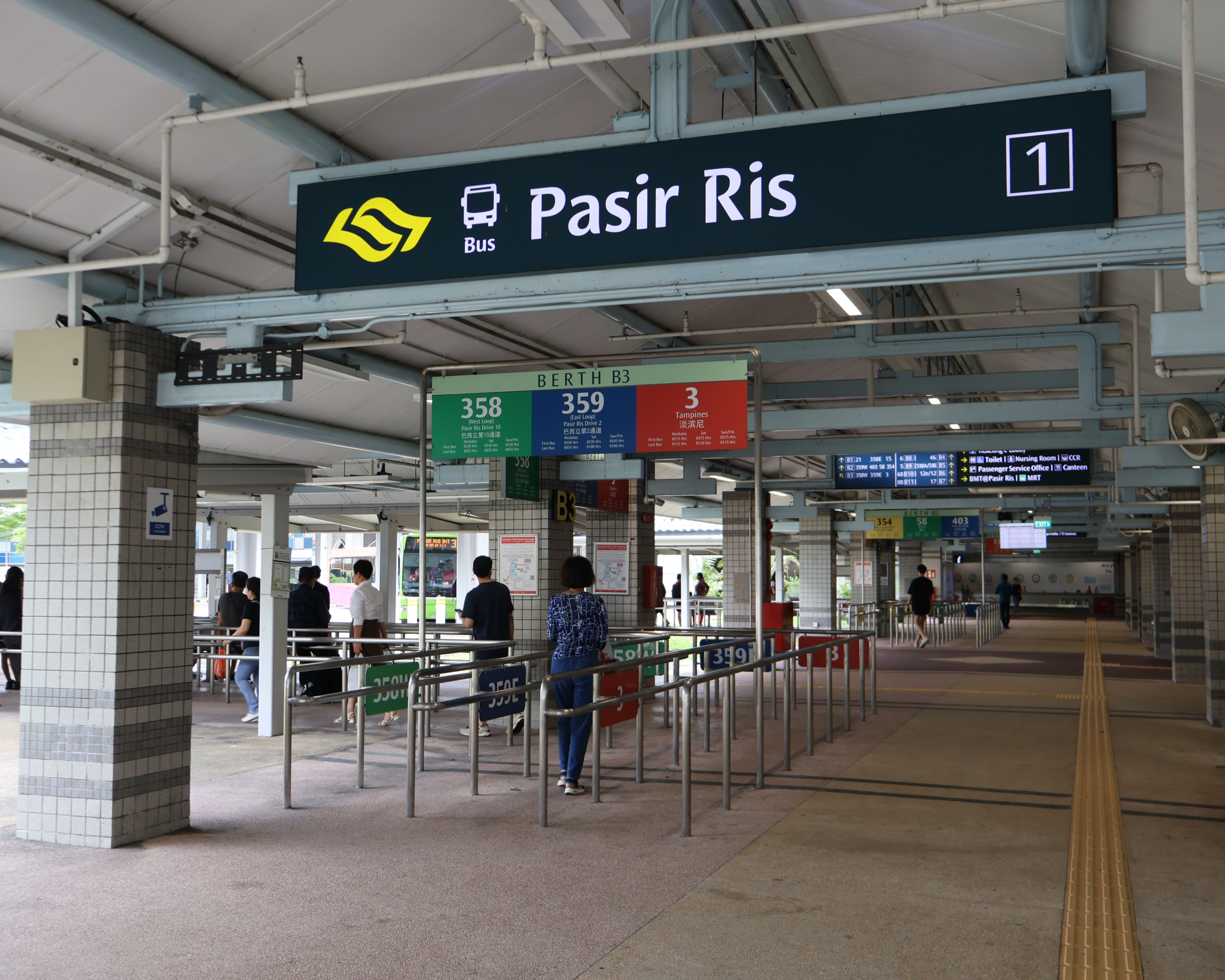
The former Pasir Ris Bus Interchange

The original open-air interchange was built at a cost of S$2.7 million and opened on 10 December 1989, along with the Eunos Bus Interchange. The interchange provides bus connections around the Pasir Ris estate. Bus Service 403 was the first bus route in Pasir Ris from 1979, which previously terminated at Tampines Road terminus before being amended to the current route of looping at Pasir Ris Road.

== Bus contracting model ==
Under the bus contracting model, all bus services operating from Pasir Ris Bus Interchange were divided into five bus packages, operated by two different bus operators. Services under the Loyang bus package started operations on 18 September 2016.

=== List of bus services ===
Operator	Package	Service	Berth	Destination	Remarks
Go-Ahead Singapore	Loyang	3	B7	Tampines	En-route stop
Go-Ahead Singapore	Loyang	6	B8	↺ Loyang Crescent	No operations on Sundays & Public Holidays
Go-Ahead Singapore	Loyang	12	B2	Kampong Bahru	—N/a
Go-Ahead Singapore	Loyang	12e	B2	Kampong Bahru	Express service
Go-Ahead Singapore	Loyang	15	B9	↺ Marine Parade Road	—N/a
Go-Ahead Singapore	Loyang	15A	B9	Jalan Eunos (Opp Eunos Station)	Short trip service
Go-Ahead Singapore	Loyang	17	B3	Bedok	—N/a
Go-Ahead Singapore	Loyang	68	B3	↺ Tampines	—N/a
Go-Ahead Singapore	Loyang	354	B6	↺ Jalan Loyang Besar	—N/a
Go-Ahead Singapore	Loyang	358/358T	B7	↺ Pasir Ris Drive 4	East Loop
Go-Ahead Singapore	Loyang	358/358T	B5	↺ Pasir Ris Drive 10	West Loop
Go-Ahead Singapore	Loyang	359/359T	B6	↺ Pasir Ris Drive 2	East Loop
Go-Ahead Singapore	Loyang	359/359T	B4	↺ Pasir Ris Street 71	West Loop
Go-Ahead Singapore	Loyang	403	B4	↺ Pasir Ris Road	—N/a
Go-Ahead Singapore	Loyang	518	B9	↺ Bayfront Avenue	Express service
Go-Ahead Singapore	Loyang	518A	B9	Bayfront Avenue (Bayfront Station Exit A)	Express service/Short trip service & weekday morning peak
SBS Transit	Bedok	46	B5	Upper East Coast	—N/a
SBS Transit	Bishan–Toa Payoh	21	B2	Saint Michael’s	—N/a
SBS Transit	Bishan–Toa Payoh	88	B1	Toa Payoh	—N/a
SBS Transit	Bukit Merah	5	B8	Bukit Merah	—N/a
SBS Transit	Serangoon–Eunos (Until June 2027)	58	B1	Bishan	—N/a
SBS Transit	Serangoon–Eunos (Until June 2027)	58B	B1	Upper Paya Lebar Road (Aft Tai Seng Station)	Short trip service
SMRT Buses	Serangoon–Eunos (From June 2027)	58	B1	Bishan	—N/a
SMRT Buses	Serangoon–Eunos (From June 2027)	58B	B1	Upper Paya Lebar Road (Aft Tai Seng Station)	Short trip service

== Redevelopment ==
Redevelopment of Pasir Ris Bus Interchange began in 2019. On 3 July 2021, a reconfigured Pasir Ris Bus Interchange started operation with inclusive facilities built as part of the relocation. It then closed on 27 April 2025, in tandem with the opening of the Pasir Ris Integrated Transport Hub.
