= Pasir Ris Elias Community Club =

Coordinates: 1.37826°N 103.94278°E

Pasir Ris Elias Community Club (CC), was formerly known as Pasir Ris Elias Community Centre and is a central meeting place in Singapore. It is the meeting ground for many residents and active volunteers, and it hosts a number of community events.

== Redesign ==
Pasir Ris Elias Community Club was completed in October, 2004, and was officially opened by Teo Chee Hean, Deputy Prime Minister, Minister for Defence and Member of Parliament for Pasir Ris-Punggol Group Representation Constituency on 18 September, 2005. In 2015 and 2016, the building underwent a 14-month series of structural improvements that cost S$6.1 million and created a total space of 6,198 sq meter. In October 2016, the Deputy Prime Minister Teo Chee Hean officiated at the re-opening and said he was "delighted" with the "brand-new facilities."

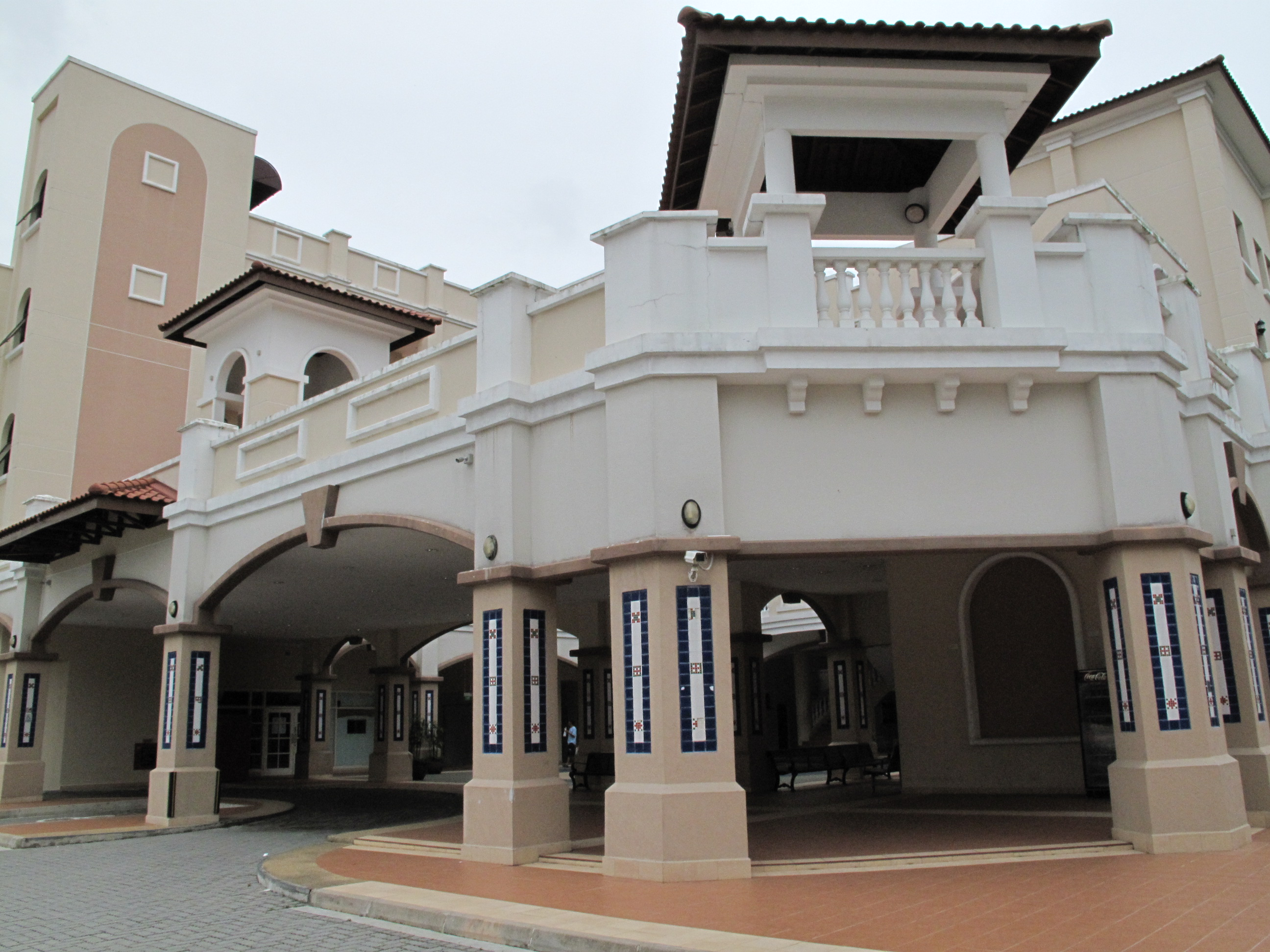
Front View

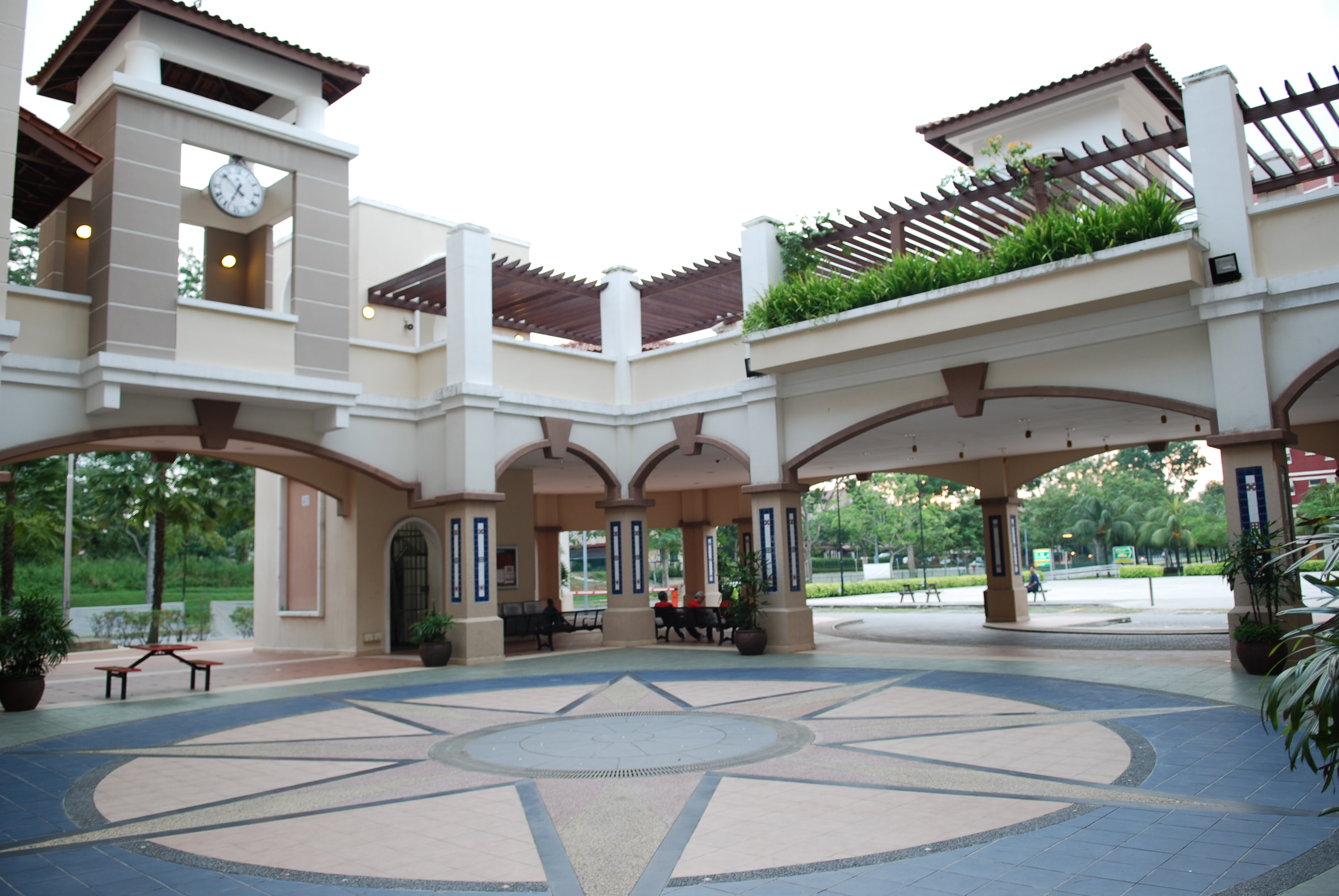
Folyer View

== Community club offerings ==
The club now offers cultural, educational, recreational, sports and social activities. Some of the new features started in 2016 include the indoor archery range that is wheelchair-friendly, a toy library and a cafe corner. It also has a Chinese Orchestra Group, a Jazz Band and the Elias Park Football Club managed by the CC. One unique new feature is the indoor toy library that was opened in June, 2016. The North East Community Toy Library @ Pasir Ris Elias Community Club is an inclusive space where children with special needs can play alongside those who are mainstreamed. There are more than 50 toys in the room and space for 30 children and their caregivers. The playroom was set up by the North East Community Development Council (CDC) and Cerebral Palsy Alliance Singapore (CPAS). It is the first integrated toy library in Singapore.

== CCMC Chairman ==
- 2012 to Present - Mr Syed Ahmad Bin Yusof Alsagoff, PBM
- 2008 to 2011 - Mr Simon Tan Teow Koon, BBM
- 2001 to 2007 - Mr Alvin Yeo Siek Khoon, BBM
- - to 2001 - Mr Neo Kim Her, PBM
