= Pasir Ris MRT station =

Mass Rapid Transit station in Singapore

Pasir Ris EW1 CR5 CP1 巴西立 பாசிர் ரிஸ்
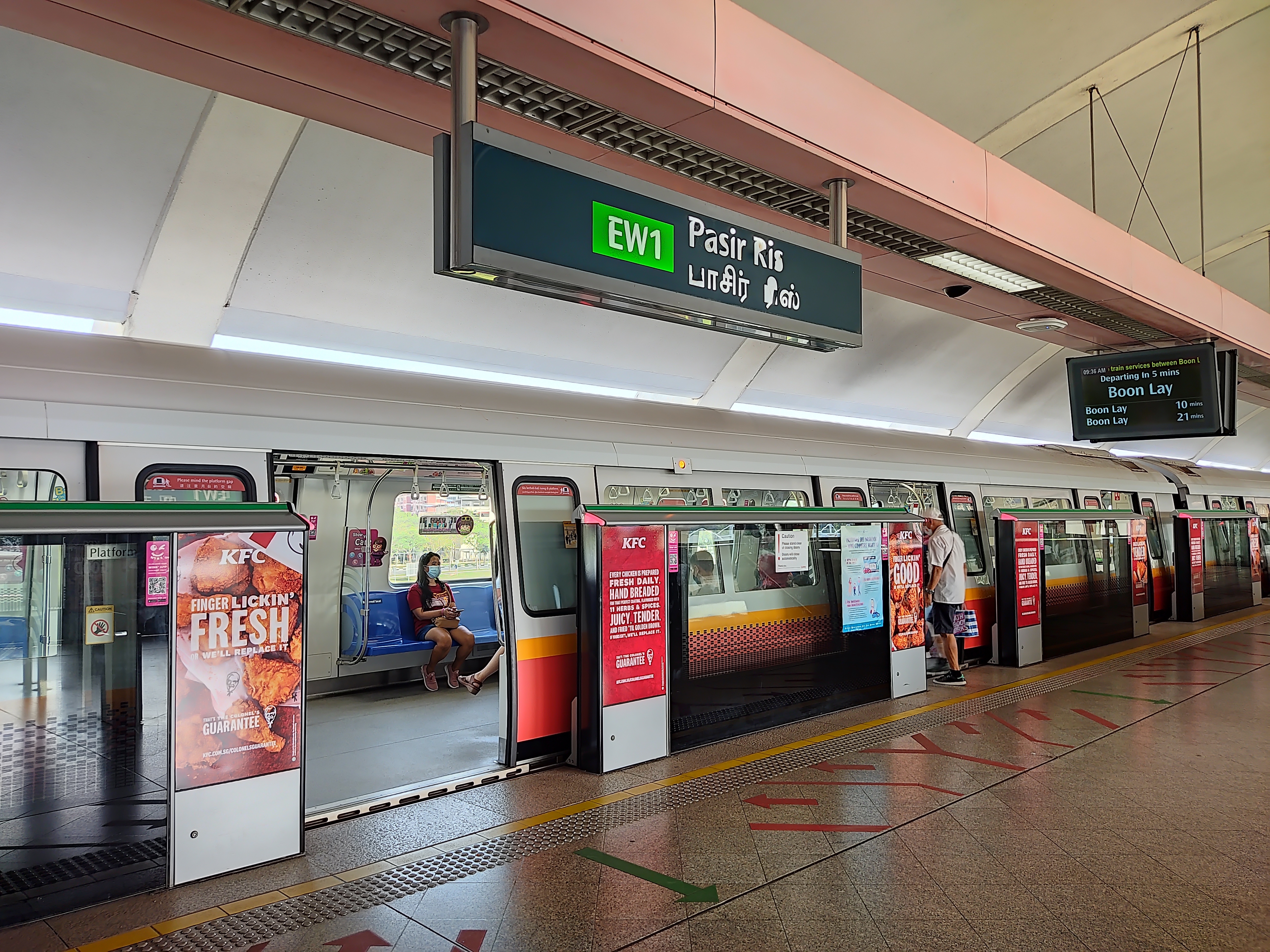
- A Kawasaki-Qingdao C151B train at Pasir Ris station

General information
- Location: 10 Pasir Ris Central, Singapore 519634 (EWL)
- Coordinates: 01°22′20.68″N 103°56′57.73″E
- System: Mass Rapid Transit (MRT) terminus
- Owner: Land Transport Authority
- Operator: SMRT Trains (East–West Line)
- Line: East–West Line Cross Island Line
- Platforms: 2 (1 island platform) + 4 (2 island platforms) (U/C)
- Tracks: 2 + 4 (U/C)
- Connections: Pasir Ris, Taxi

Construction
- Structure type: Elevated (EWL); Underground (CRL)
- Depth: 47 metres (154 ft)
- Platform levels: 1 + 2 (U/C)
- Parking: Yes (White Sands Shopping Mall)
- Cycle facilities: Yes
- Accessible: Yes

Other information
- Station code: PSR

History
- Opened: 16 December 1989; 36 years ago (East–West Line)
- Opening: 2030; 4 years' time (Cross Island Line); 2032; 6 years' time (Punggol extension)

Passengers
- June 2024: 27,307 per day

Services
Preceding station	Mass Rapid Transit	Following station
Terminus	East–West Line	Tampines towards Tuas Link
Pasir Ris East towards Aviation Park	Cross Island Line Future service	Tampines North towards Bright Hill
Terminus	Cross Island Line Punggol Extension Future service	Elias towards Punggol
Track layout
Location
- Location within Singapore Rail

Pasir Ris MRT station (/ˌpɑːsər ˈrɪs, -seɪ-/) is an elevated Mass Rapid Transit (MRT) station on the East–West Line (EWL) in Pasir Ris, Singapore. Situated along Pasir Ris Central adjacent to Pasir Ris Bus Interchange, Pasir Ris Mall, and White Sands Shopping Mall, it is the eastern terminus of the EWL. The station's EWL exterior has the characteristic dome-shaped segmented roof also seen on other elevated EWL stations in the eastern region of the country.

The station opened on 16 December 1989 as the terminus of the MRT's eastern line extension. In 2016, two maintenance workers were run over and killed on the tracks away from the station. In January 2019, it was announced that the station would be an interchange with the Cross Island Line (CRL) when the first stage opens in 2030. The station is also planned to be the terminus for the future CRL branch extension to Punggol station in 2032, as announced in March 2020. The CRL station will be the second deepest MRT station on the network at 47 metres (154 ft) underground, behind King Albert Park's CRL station at 50 metres (160 ft).

== History ==
=== East–West Line (EWL) ===
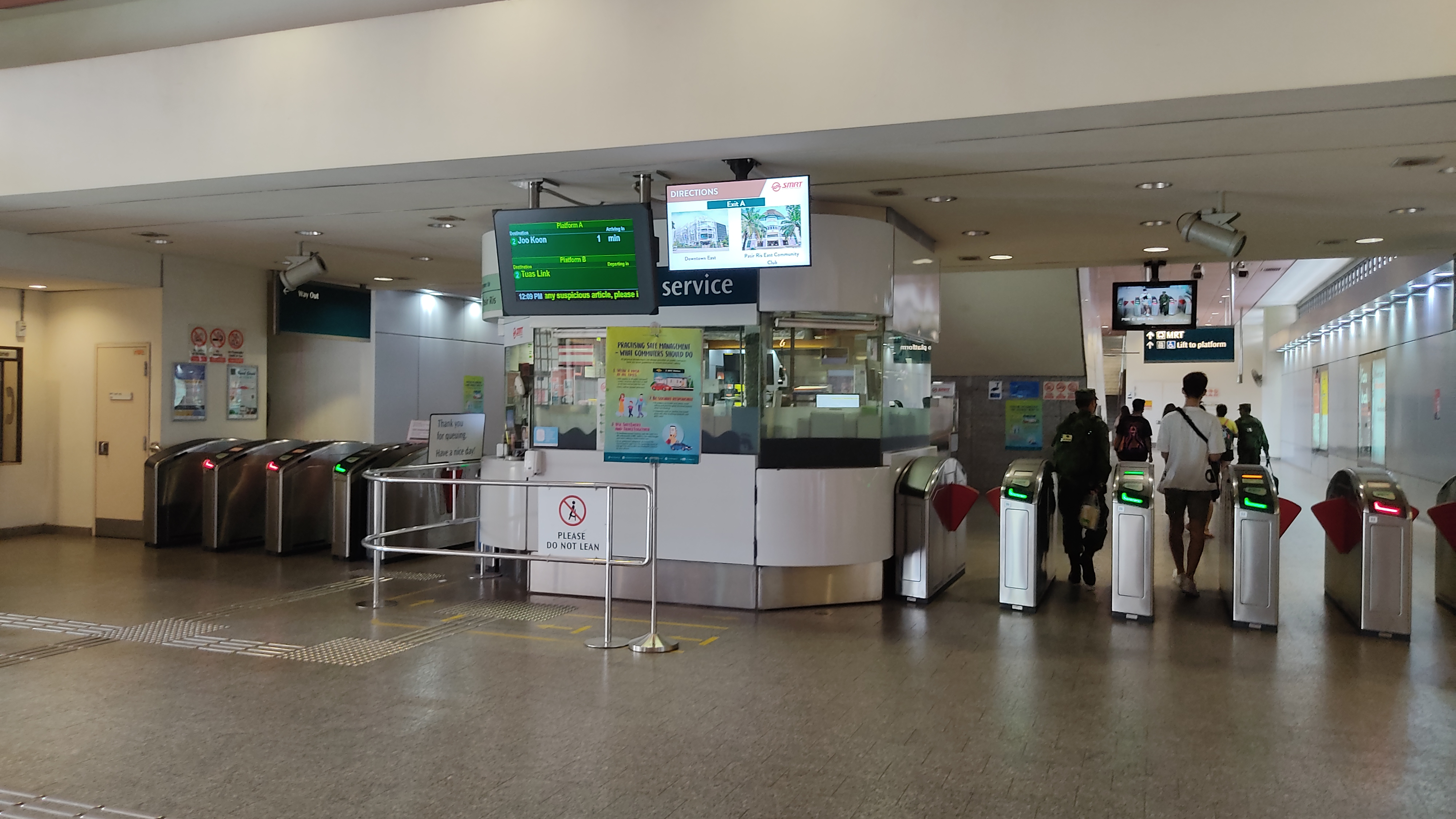
Concourse level

The station was constructed as the terminus of an extension of the East–West Line from Tanah Merah station, which in turn was part of Phase 2A of the MRT system. The contract for the construction of the stations from Changi Depot to Pasir Ris and 5.5 kilometres (3.4 miles) of tracks was awarded to Sato Kogyo Pte Ltd at a contract sum of S$91.89 million (US$42.2 million) in March 1986. The contract also included the construction of the Tampines and Simei stations.

The station opened on 16 December 1989 as the eastern terminus of the EWL as announced by then-deputy prime minister Goh Chok Tong on 4 November that year. The opening ceremony, officiated by then-Minister of State Mah Bow Tan, included an MRT ride for Mah and four other Members of Parliament from Simei to this station. The station opening was generally well received by residents in Tampines and Pasir Ris, who were hoping for quicker rides to their workplaces in the city via the MRT.

==== EWL station upgrades ====
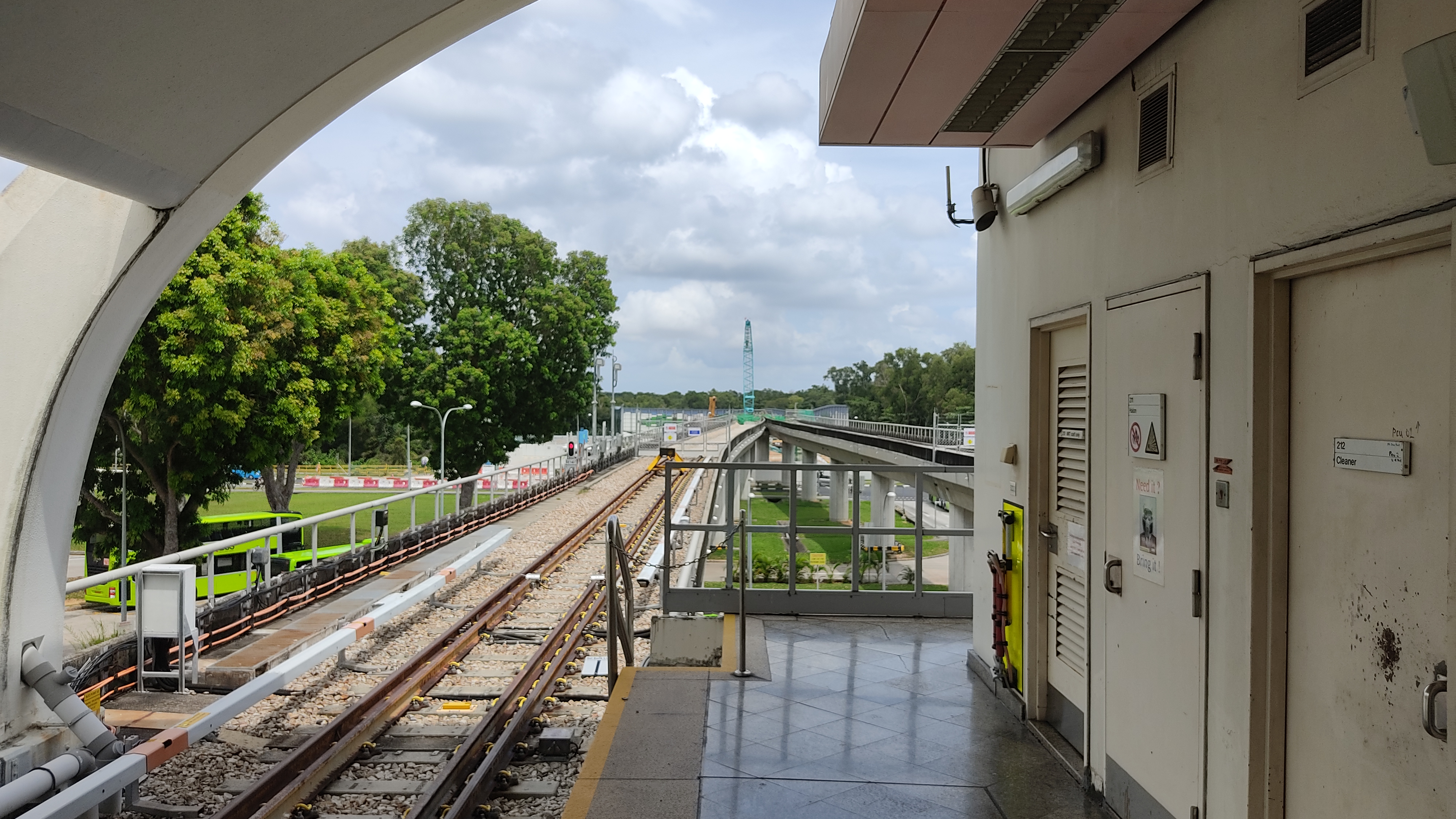
Works for the extension of the overrun viaducts in 2020, which was completed in 2024

Like the other elevated MRT stations, Pasir Ris station did not initially have platform screen doors installed. On 25 January 2008, the Land Transport Authority (LTA) announced the installation half-height platform screen doors on elevated stations to improve safety on elevated stations. The installation began at Pasir Ris station in August 2009 and the doors began operations later in November. High-volume low-speed fans were installed above the platforms of the station between 2012 and 2013 as part of a national programme to improve ventaliation at station platforms.

On 29 June 2018, the Land Transport Authority (LTA) announced that the EWL overrun viaducts would be extended by 150 metres (490 ft). A new crossover, in conjunction with the implementation of communications-based train control (CBTC), will allow faster turnarounds for trains and segregation of platforms at the terminus. The station's operations will be unaffected by the works as the enhancement works will be done away from the station itself. In March 2019, the contract for the construction of new overrun and crossover tracks was awarded to China Civil Engineering Construction Corporation Branch Office Singapore / Gates PCM Construction Ltd (JV). The S$56.7 million (US$41.56 million) contract included the partial removal of existing overrun tracks. Construction commenced in 2019 and was completed in May 2024. As of 2022, only off-service trains uses the turnback tracks.

=== Cross Island Line ===
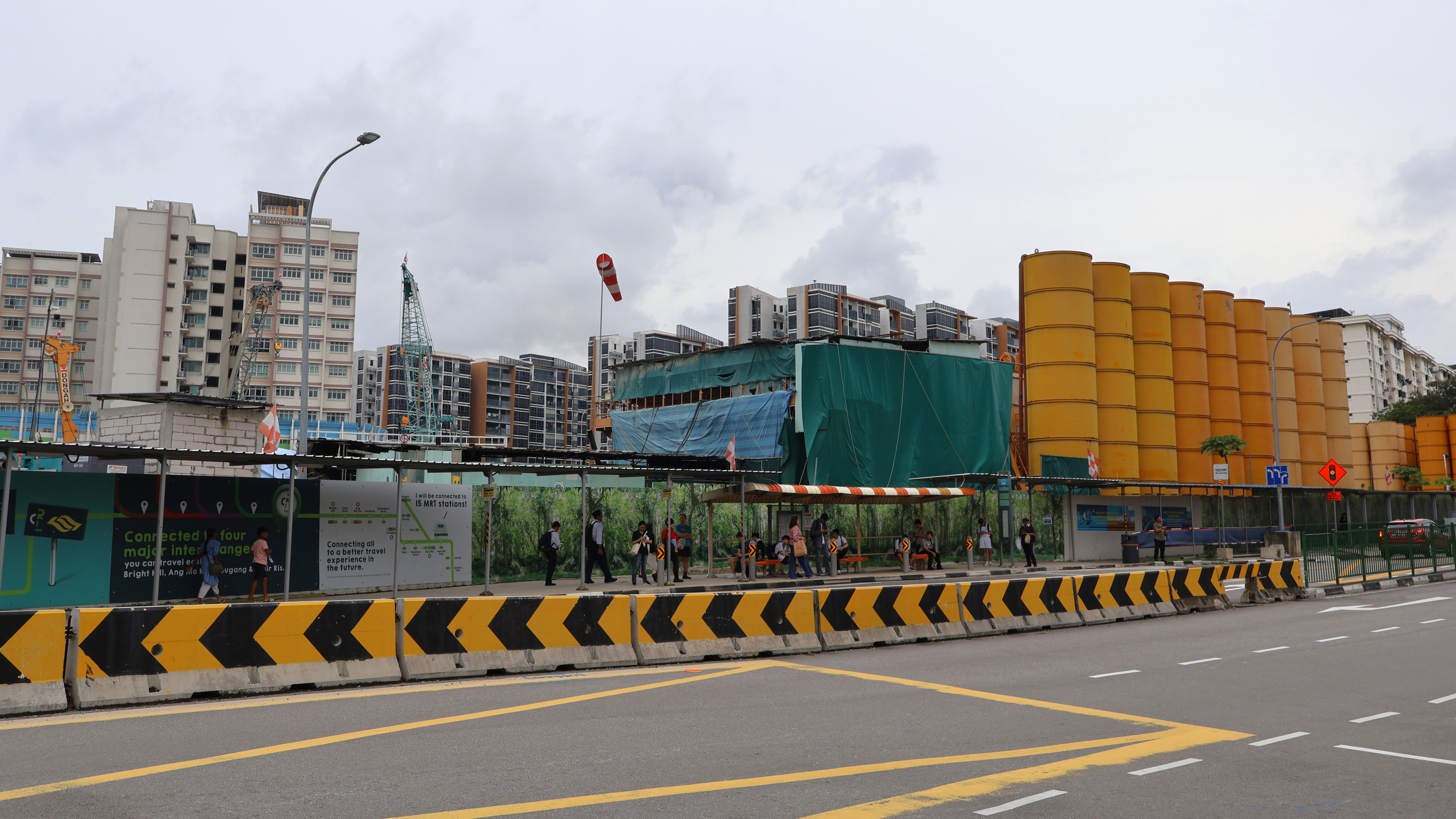
Construction site of the CRL station in 2025

On 17 January 2013, transport minister Lui Tuck Yew announced that the proposed Cross Island Line (CRL) will serve the Pasir Ris area. On 25 January 2019, the LTA confirmed that Pasir Ris station will be an interchange with the CRL. The CRL station will be constructed as part of Phase 1, consisting of 12 stations between Aviation Park and Bright Hill, and was expected to be completed in 2029. On 10 March 2020, it was announced that this station will serve as the eastern terminus for the CRL extension to Punggol station. The 7.3-kilometre (4.5-mile) Punggol extension, consisting of four stations between this station and Punggol, was expected to be completed in 2031. However, the restrictions imposed on construction works due to the COVID-19 pandemic has led to delays and the dates was pushed by one year to 2030 and 2032 for CRL1 and CRLe respectively.

The contract for the design and construction of Pasir Ris CRL Station and associated tunnels was awarded to a joint venture between Daewoo Engineering & Construction Co Ltd and Dongah Geological Engineering Co Ltd Singapore Branch at S$980 million (US$718.37 million) on 26 April 2021. Construction was scheduled to begin in the fourth quarter of 2021, with expected completion in 2030. When completed, the CRL station will be the second deepest MRT station on the network at 47 metres (154 ft) underground, behind King Albert Park's CRL station at 50 metres (160 ft). On 8 October 2023, a part of Pasir Ris Drive 1 between Pasir Ris Drive 8 and Pasir Ris Central was closed off to facilitate the construction of the station.

=== 2016 rail incident ===
On 22 March 2016, two SMRT maintenance trainees were run over and killed by an oncoming C151 train at around 11:10 am. They were part of a team of 15 personnel tasked to investigate a possible signaling system fault, after a high voltage alarm set off. The incident took place at the track switch 150 metres (490 ft) away from the station. This led to a 2.5-hour train service disruption from 11:10 am to 1:56 pm for train services between Pasir Ris and Tanah Merah, and had affected at least 10,000 commuters.

After an internal investigation, SMRT sacked both the engineer who led the track team and the train driver and also disciplined the staff involved for their role in the incident. The sacking of both employees attracted online controversy, with Singaporeans on social media questioning whether it was fair to sack the train driver. SMRT Trains, the director of control operations and the SMRT engineer who led the track team were charged for the incident. Upon investigation, it was revealed that safety protocols were not implemented that would have prevented the train from entering the worksite.

The engineer who led the inspection team was charged with negligence causing death under the Penal Code and was subsequently sentenced to 4 weeks in jail. SMRT Trains and one member of SMRT management were charged for violating the Workplace Safety and Health Act for lapses which led to the accident, and were fined $400,000 respectively. and $55,000. On 20 July 2018, the Land Transport Authority fined the operator S$1.9 million (US$1.41 million) for this incident and the Bishan tunnel flooding.

== Details ==
=== Location ===
As the name suggests, the station serves the town of Pasir Ris. The station is adjacent to White Sands Shopping Mall, Pasir Ris Mall, and the Pasir Ris Bus Interchange, and is close to prominent landmarks such as Pasir Ris Town Park, Pasir Ris Sports and Recreation Centre, Pasir Ris Park, and the retail development of Downtown East.

The station serves a mixed-use commercial and residential development that integrates with the bus interchange, a polyclinic and a town plaza. The site for the development was awarded to Phoenix Residential Pte. Ltd. & Phoenix Commercial Pte. Ltd. for S$700 million (US$321.5 million) in March 2019.

=== Services ===
As of June 2021, Pasir Ris is the eastern terminus of the EWL. The next station on the line is Tampines station. The official station code is EW1. When it opened, it had the station code of E12 before being changed to its current station code in August 2001 as a part of a system-wide campaign to cater to the expanding MRT System. The station operates between 5:28 am and 11:23 pm. Train frequencies range from 2 to 5 minutes depending on peak hours.

When the CRL Phase 1 and the Punggol extension are completed, the station will be between the Pasir Ris East and Tampines North stations on the mainline. The CRL will branch off from this station to Punggol station via the adjacent Elias station.

=== Design ===
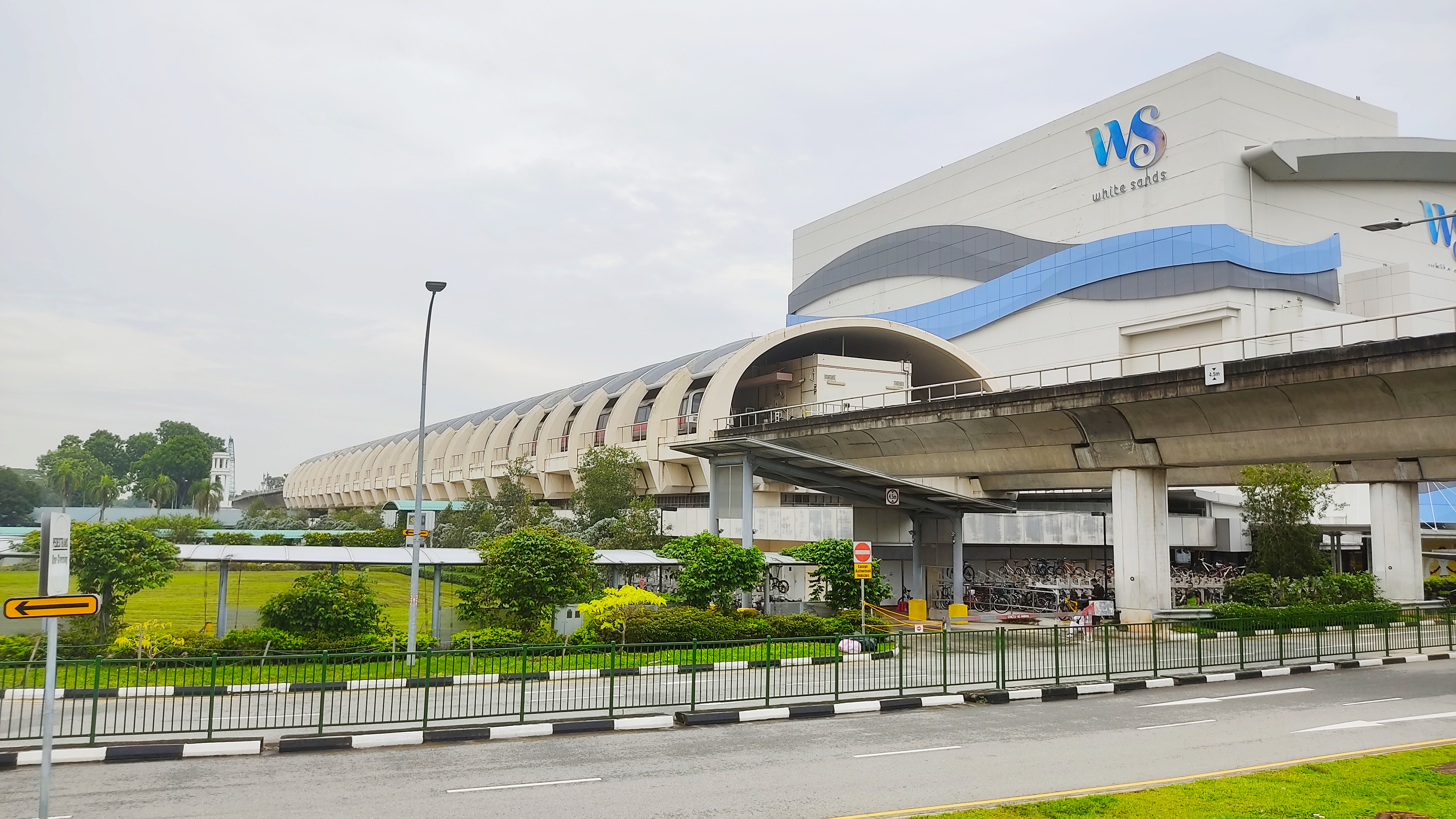
The EWL station exterior in 2020, prior to the development of its surrounding areas

Like most EWL elevated stations on the eastern segment on the line (after Kallang station), Pasir Ris station has a prominent dome-shaped roof, segmented like a caterpillar, over the platform level. The design was intended by the MRT Corporation to give the stations on the EWL an "attractive look". The station has a pink colour scheme, reflected on the doors to the restricted areas and the ceiling trunking box at the platform level of the station.

The CRL station will have a depth of 47 metres (154 ft), making it the deepest MRT station when it opens in 2030; it will hold this record until the CRL station at King Albert Park opens around 2032.

=== Comic Connect ===
As part of SMRT's Comic Connect – a public art showcase of heritage-themed murals, the station displays a mural Memories of Pasir Ris which depict various historic icons of Pasir Ris. These include a single-door bus route serving Pasir Ris and Tampines, the Worker's Brigade (Singapore's "army without guns" formed in 1959), the mosaic elephant playground, the Loyang Tua Pek Kong Temple, Pasir Ris Hotel, and the Golden Palace Holiday Resort. Also depicted are the local wildlife of birds which inhabit the beaches of Pasir Ris.
