= Tampines East MRT station =

Mass Rapid Transit station in Singapore

Tampines East DT33 淡滨尼东 தெம்பினிஸ் ஈஸ்ட்
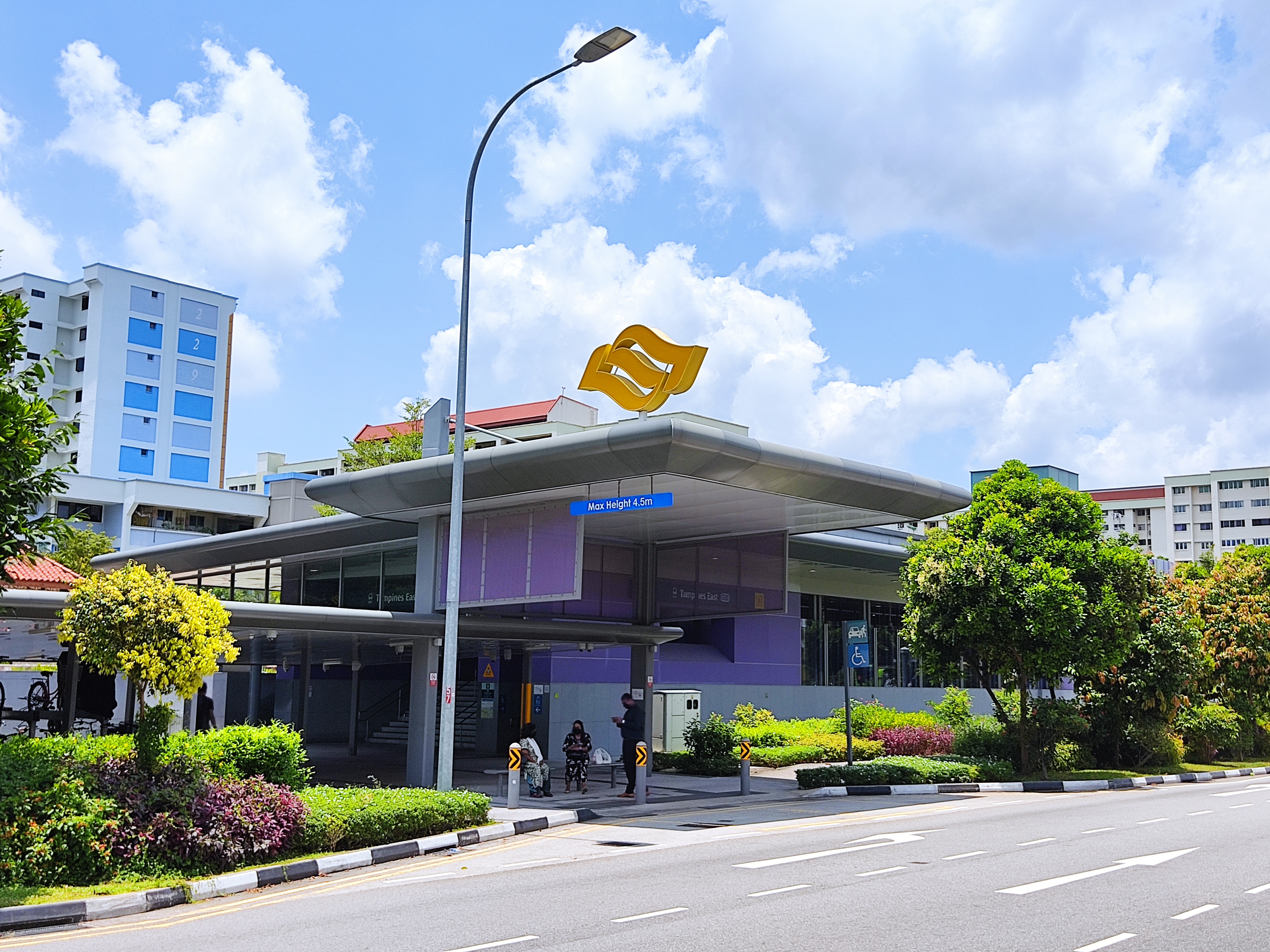
- Exit B of Tampines East station

General information
- Location: 20 Tampines Avenue 7, Singapore 529623
- Coordinates: 01°21′23″N 103°57′17″E
- System: Mass Rapid Transit (MRT) station
- Owner: Land Transport Authority
- Operator: SBS Transit
- Line: Downtown Line
- Platforms: 2 (1 island platform)
- Tracks: 2
- Connections: Bus, Taxi

Construction
- Structure type: Underground
- Platform levels: 1
- Cycle facilities: Yes
- Accessible: Yes

Other information
- Station code: TPE

History
- Opened: 21 October 2017; 9 years ago

Passengers
- June 2024: 16,105 per day

Services
Preceding station	Mass Rapid Transit	Following station
Tampines towards Bukit Panjang	Downtown Line	Upper Changi towards Expo
Track layout
Location
- Location within Singapore Rail

Tampines East MRT station is an underground Mass Rapid Transit (MRT) station on the Downtown Line in Tampines, Singapore. It is located along Tampines Avenue 7, near the junction with Tampines Avenue 2. This station, like most of the other Downtown Line stations, also serves as a Civil Defence Shelter.

The station serves Tampines North Park, Tampines North, and East residents and nearby schools such as East Spring Secondary School, Ngee Ann Secondary School, and Dunman Secondary School. From January 2024 to December 2027, the station will serve Temasek Junior College in their holding site, located at the now defunct Tampines Junior College Campus.

== History ==
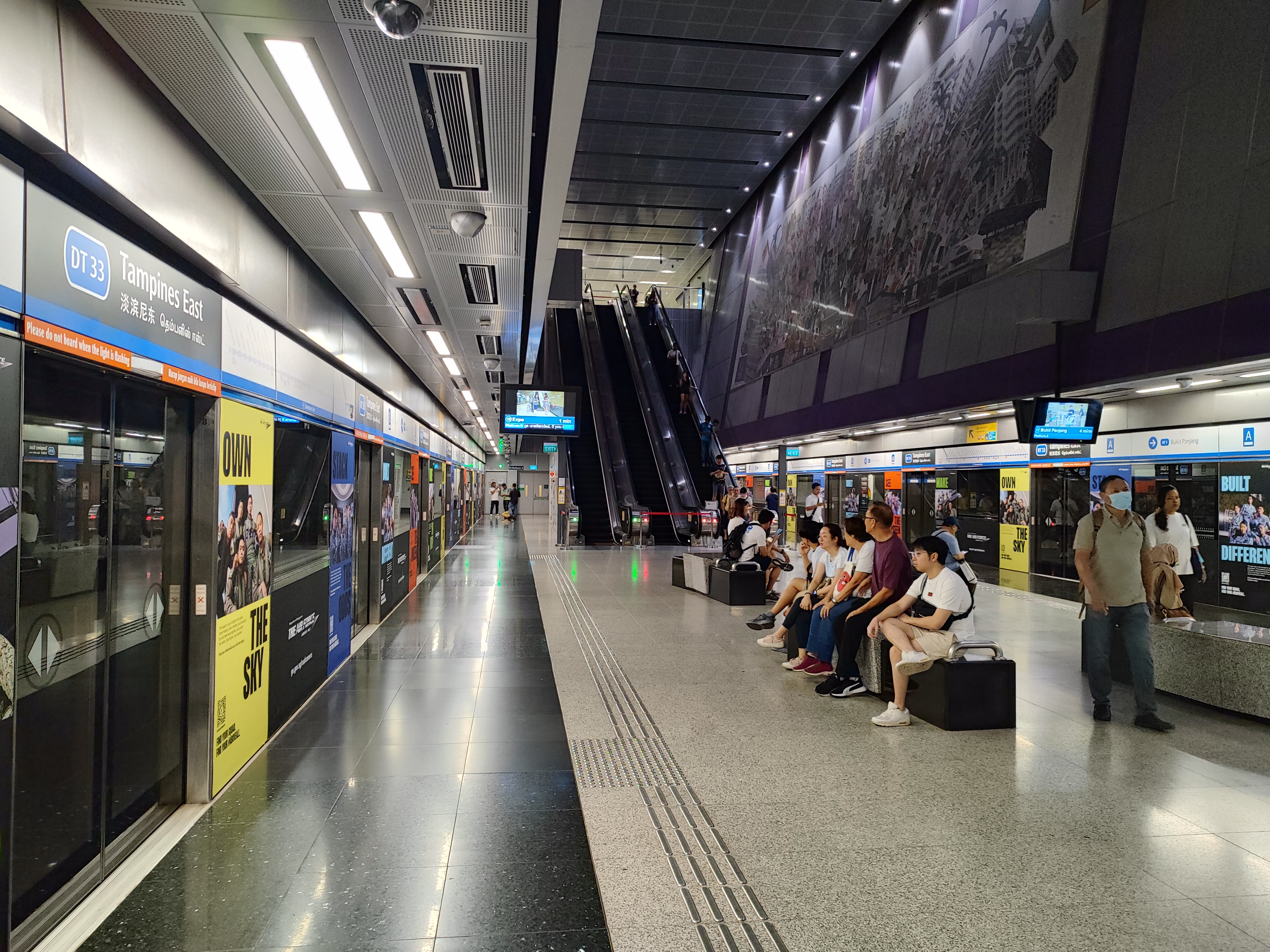
Platform level of the station.

Contract 925 for the construction and completion of Tampines East Station and associated tunnels was awarded to GS Engineering & Construction Corp for an estimated sum of S$208.52 million (USD 153.29 million) in July 2011.

Construction did not begin until late November 2011, where construction begun throughout the entire stretch of Tampines Avenue 7 from the junction of Tampines Street 42 to the junction of Tampines Avenue 7, 2, and 9. The road was realigned on 25 March 2012.

This station opened on 21 October 2017, as announced by the Land Transport Authority on 31 May that year.

== Station details ==
Tampines East MRT Station serves the Downtown Line and is located between Upper Changi and Tampines stations. The station code is DT33. The station is located under Tampines Avenue 7, near the Junction with Tampines Avenue 9 and Tampines Avenue 7. The station has 4 entrances serving various HDB residences, schools such as Ngee Ann Secondary School, East Spring Secondary School, Dunman Secondary School, Temasek Junior College, and the Tampines North Park. There are also 3 bus stops and 1 taxi stand outside the station entrances for a more convenient interchange for commuters. Tampines East Station is also a Civil Defence (CD) shelter. A convenience store, Cheers, is located at the concourse level of the station next to entrance A.

Like other MRT stations in Singapore, the station is wheelchair-accessible, with a lift at every entrance and between the concourse and platform. Tactile flooring is also installed in the station from entrances to the boarding platform for the visually impaired.

=== Public artwork ===
As part of the Art-in-Transit programme in MRT, an artwork named Welcome to Jingapore! by Quek Jing Cheng, an internationally awarded photographer, who also created the artwork in Tampines West MRT Station, is featured on the station walls above the platform. The artwork features 200 members of the public with many landmarks in the Tampines East area.
