= Tanah Merah MRT station =

Mass Rapid Transit station in Singapore

Tanah Merah EW4 CG 丹那美拉 தானா மேரா
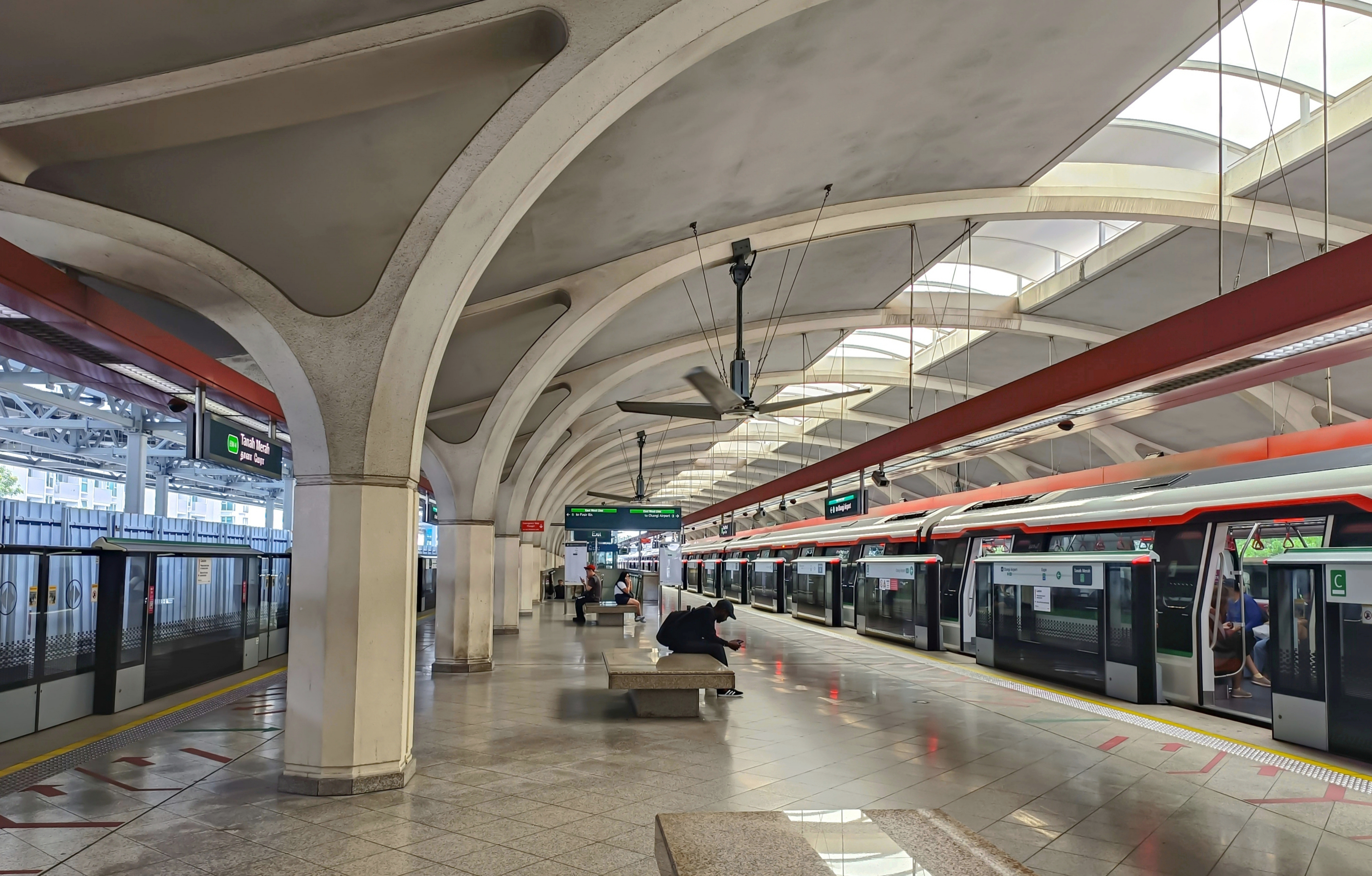
- Platforms A and C in 2024, now labelled Platforms C and D, Tanah Merah station

General information
- Location: 920 New Upper Changi Road, Singapore 467356
- Coordinates: 01°19′38″N 103°56′47″E
- System: Mass Rapid Transit (MRT) interchange and terminus
- Owner: Land Transport Authority
- Operator: SMRT Trains
- Line: East–West Line Thomson–East Coast Line (from mid-2030s)
- Platforms: 6 (3 island platforms) (2 platforms are closed for works)
- Tracks: 4 (1 track is closed for works)
- Connections: Bus, Taxi

Construction
- Structure type: Elevated
- Platform levels: 1
- Parking: No
- Cycle facilities: Yes
- Accessible: Yes

Other information
- Station code: TNM

History
- Opened: 4 November 1989; 37 years ago (Platforms D to F); 8 December 2025; 11 months ago (Platform A)
- Opening: mid-2030s (Thomson–East Coast Line)
- Closed: 29 November 2025; 11 months ago (Temporary closure for works) (Platforms B & C)
- Former names: Bedok, Changi

Passengers
- June 2024: 14,378 per day

Services
Preceding station	Mass Rapid Transit	Following station
Simei towards Pasir Ris	East–West Line	Bedok towards Tuas Link
Terminus	East–West Line Changi Airport Line	Expo towards Changi Airport
Expo towards Woodlands North	Thomson–East Coast Line Future service	Terminus
Track layout
Location
- Location within Singapore Rail

Tanah Merah MRT station (/ˈtɑːnɑː ˌmeɪrɑː, -ˌmɛrɑː/ TAH-nah MAY-rah) is an elevated Mass Rapid Transit (MRT) station on the East–West Line (EWL). Located in Bedok, Singapore, the station is along New Upper Changi Road and serves various residential developments. It is the terminus of the EWL branch to Changi Airport station.

Tentatively named Changi during its construction, the station opened on 4 November 1989. It began to serve the Changi Airport branch on 10 January 2001 following the opening of Expo station, and will interchange with the Thomson–East Coast Line (TEL) when the latter takes over the Changi Airport branch following its extension to Changi Airport Terminal 5 by the mid-2030s.

== History ==
The station was named Bedok in the early plans of the MRT network published in May 1982. The station was subsequently renamed as Changi when Phase II stations were announced in October 1983. The contract for the construction of Changi station and associated viaducts was awarded to a joint venture between Wah Chang International Corporation and Hyundai Engineering and Construction Co Ltd for S$68.76 million (US$93.8 million in 2022).

The station's name was finalised to Tanah Merah in March 1987. The station opened on 4 November 1989 as part of the MRT segment from Bugis to this station, with the official opening ceremony hosted at this station by deputy prime minister Goh Chok Tong.

Half-height platform screen doors were installed at this station around 2011 as part of the Land Transport Authority's (LTA) programme to improve safety in MRT stations. Between 2012 and 2013, high-volume low-speed fans (HVLS) were installed at this station as part of a network-wide programme to improve ventilation at the platforms of elevated stations.

=== Changi Airport branch ===
While a branch to Changi Airport from this station was included in the early plans of the MRT network in May 1982, the Mass Rapid Transit Corporation (MRTC) concluded through a feasibility study in 1983 that there might not be sufficient passenger traffic to justify such a branch. The proposals for an MRT extension from Tanah Merah to Changi Airport was revisited in August 1994 following a surge in airport usage.

Finalised plans for the 6.4-kilometre (4.0 mi) branch were announced by deputy prime minister Lee Hsien Loong on 15 November 1996. The branch, projected to be completed in 2001, would run from this station and have an intermediate stop at Somapah (after the nearby Somapah Road) to serve the Changi Business Park (CBP) and the exhibition centre. The branch opened on 10 January 2001, with shuttle services running via Expo station.

=== Additional platform ===
In 2014, the LTA announced plans to expand Tanah Merah station with a new platform to increase frequency of the Changi Airport branch. The new platform will be constructed next to the existing eastbound platform. When completed, the middle two tracks will be used to serve the Changi Airport branch. Additional tracks will also be constructed to connect the station to the East Coast Integrated Depot (ECID). This will be LTA's second project to construct new tracks and platforms for an existing station after Jurong East station.

The contract for the construction of the new platform and viaducts was awarded to Lum Chang Building Contractors Pte. Ltd. for S$325 million (US$242.54 million) in October 2016. Construction works were scheduled to begin at the end of that year with an expected completion date of 2024. On 25 May 2019, the LTA further announced that the Changi Airport branch will be converted to be part of the Thomson–East Coast Line (TEL) when TEL extends to Changi Airport from Sungei Bedok station via Terminal 5 by the mid-2030s. In November 2022, transport minister S Iswaran announced that, as part of efforts for sustainable transport infrastructure, studies are ongoing to convert an existing 1-kilometre (0.62-mile) viaduct set to be decommissioned to a green corridor for pedestrians and cyclists. On 29 April 2024, the LTA called a tender to modify the existing station, along with Expo and Changi Airport stations, in preparation for their conversion to being part of the TEL.

To connect the tracks between the EWL and the ECID, train services between Tanah Merah and Tampines stations were suspended from 7 to 9 December 2024. Another round of train service suspensions between Bedok and Tampines stations, and between Tanah Merah and Expo stations on the airport branch line, took place from 29 November to 7 December 2025. A third round of service suspension is planned to take place in the first half of 2026.

The new platform opened on 8 December 2025, serving Pasir Ris-bound train services. The track that previously served Pasir Ris-bound train services has been closed to passenger service since 29 November 2025 for modification works as part of the TEL extension via Changi Airport Terminal 5.

Tanah Merah Modification Project

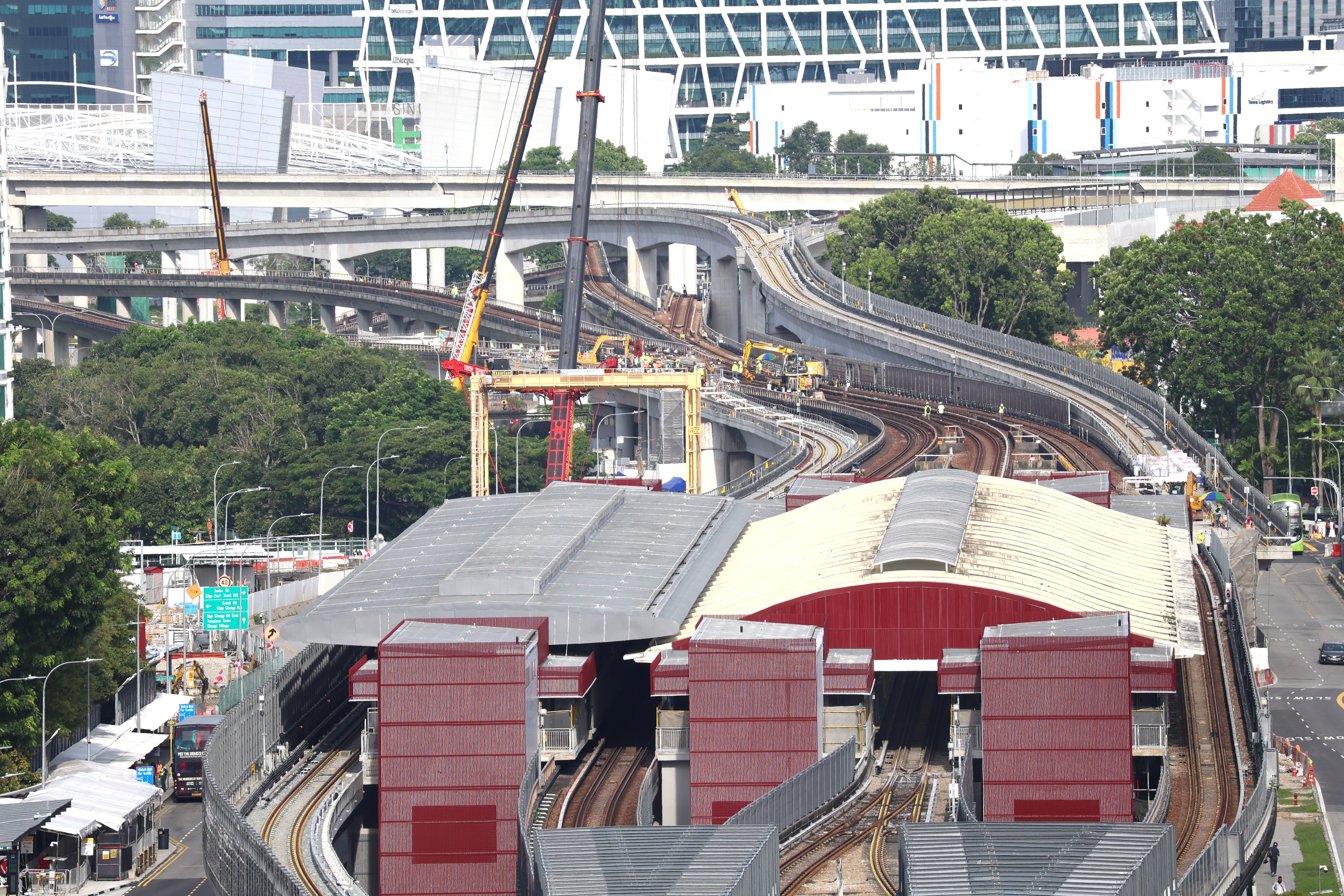
New platform (left) and works east of Tanah Merah station on 29 November

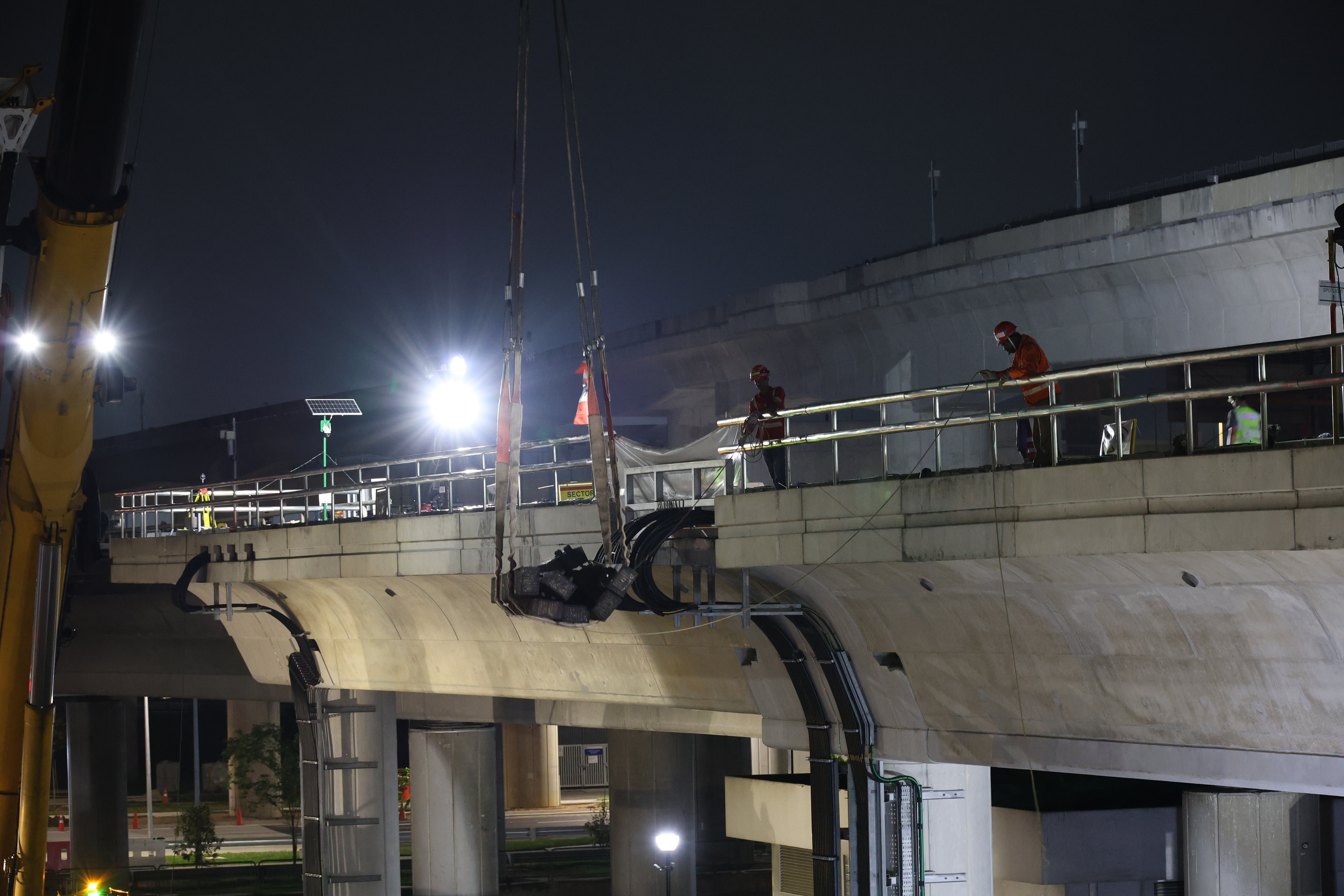
Works to remove old sleepers on 30 November east of Tanah Merah station

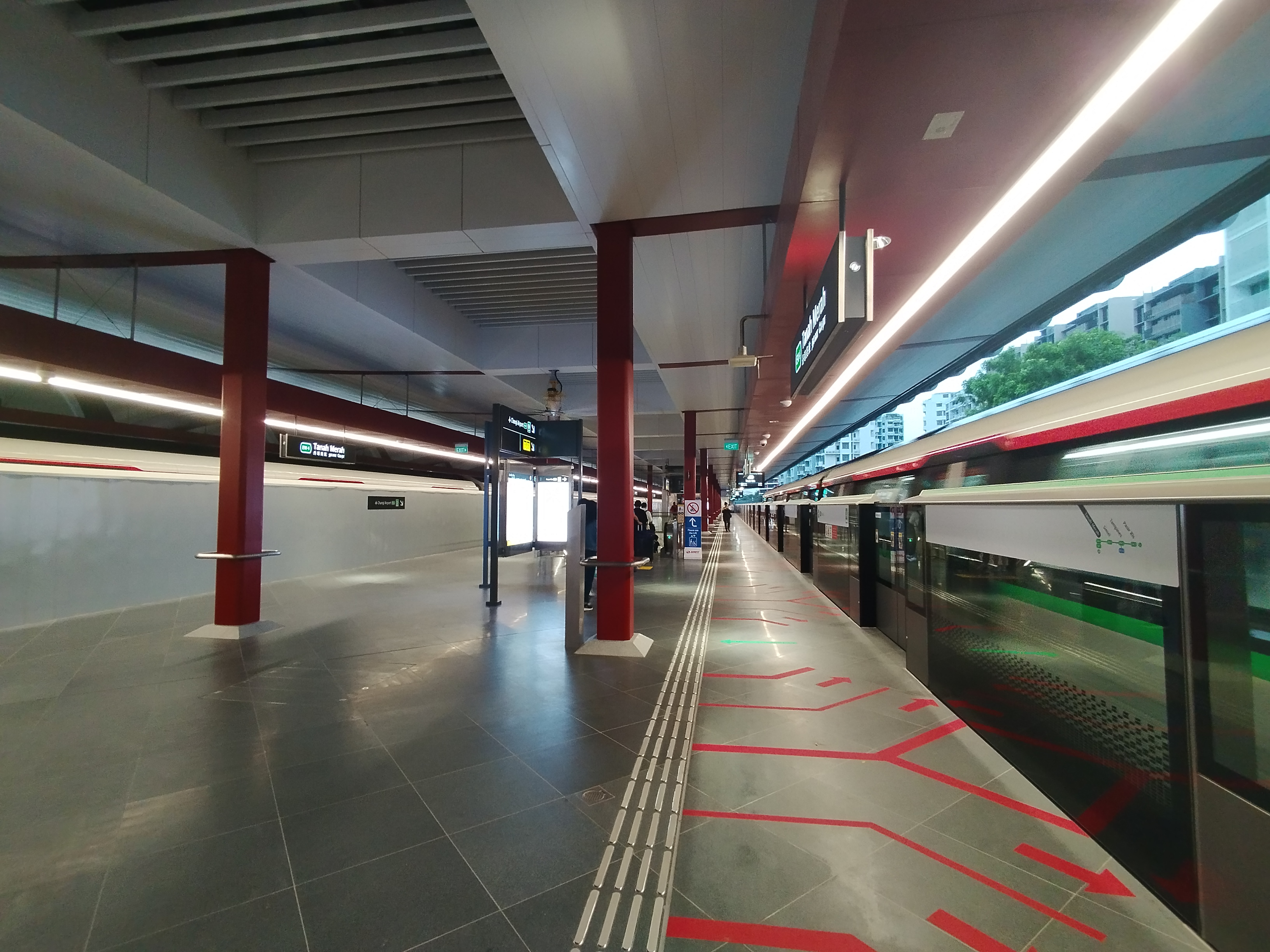
View of the new Platform A (right) and B (left)

== Details ==
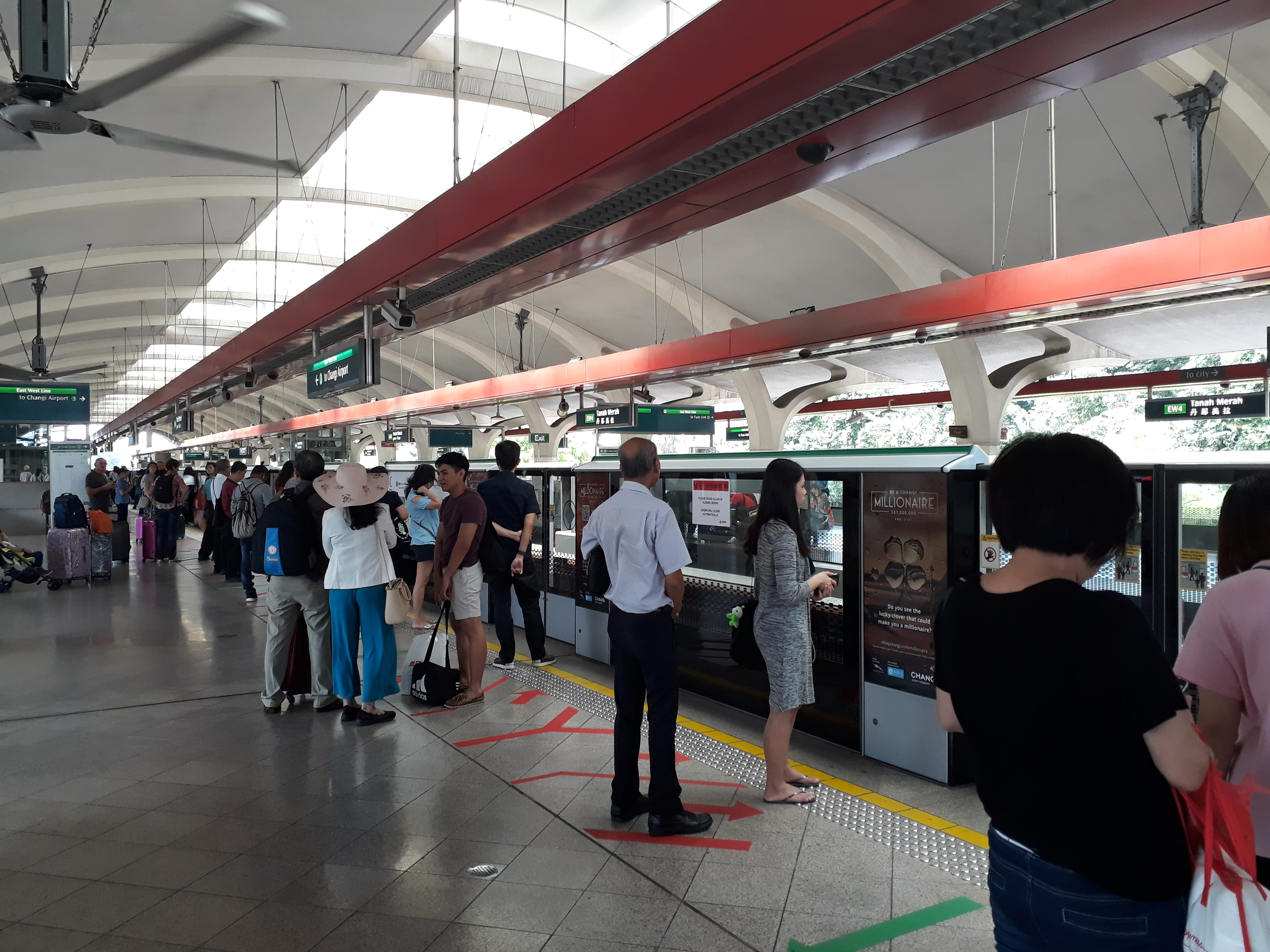
Platform D in 2018, now labelled Platform E, which serves the Changi Airport branch

Tanah Merah station serves the East–West Line (EWL) and is between the Simei and Bedok stations. The station is also the terminus of the Changi Airport branch line, with the next station being Expo. The official station code is EW4/CG. When it opened, it had the station code of E9 before being changed to the current alphanumeric style in August 2001 as a part of a system-wide campaign to cater to the expanding MRT System. Tanah Merah station is located along New Upper Changi Road and serves various private residential developments including Casa Merah, Optima @ Tanah Merah and The Glades. The station is also close to Simpang Bedok, and schools such as APSN (Katong School) and Bedok View Secondary School and Anglican High School.

The station operates daily between 5:00 am and 12:45 am. It previously opened from 4:55 am and 12:45 am until 8 December 2025. The first train was delayed to 5:55 am at Platform A from 8 December 2025. Mainline train frequencies range from 2 to 5 minutes. Since 22 July 2003, Tanah Merah station has been the terminus for shuttle services to Expo and Changi Airport stations, with frequencies for the service ranging from 7 to 13 minutes. The station has three island platforms and four tracks, with the side tracks (Platforms A and F) used by mainline train services, and the track serving Platforms D and E used by shuttle services to Expo and Changi Airport stations. Before 8 December 2025, the station had two island platforms and three tracks, with the middle track used by the shuttle service.
