= Changi Airport MRT station =

Mass Rapid Transit station in Singapore

Changi Airport CG2 樟宜机场 சாங்கி விமானநிலையம்
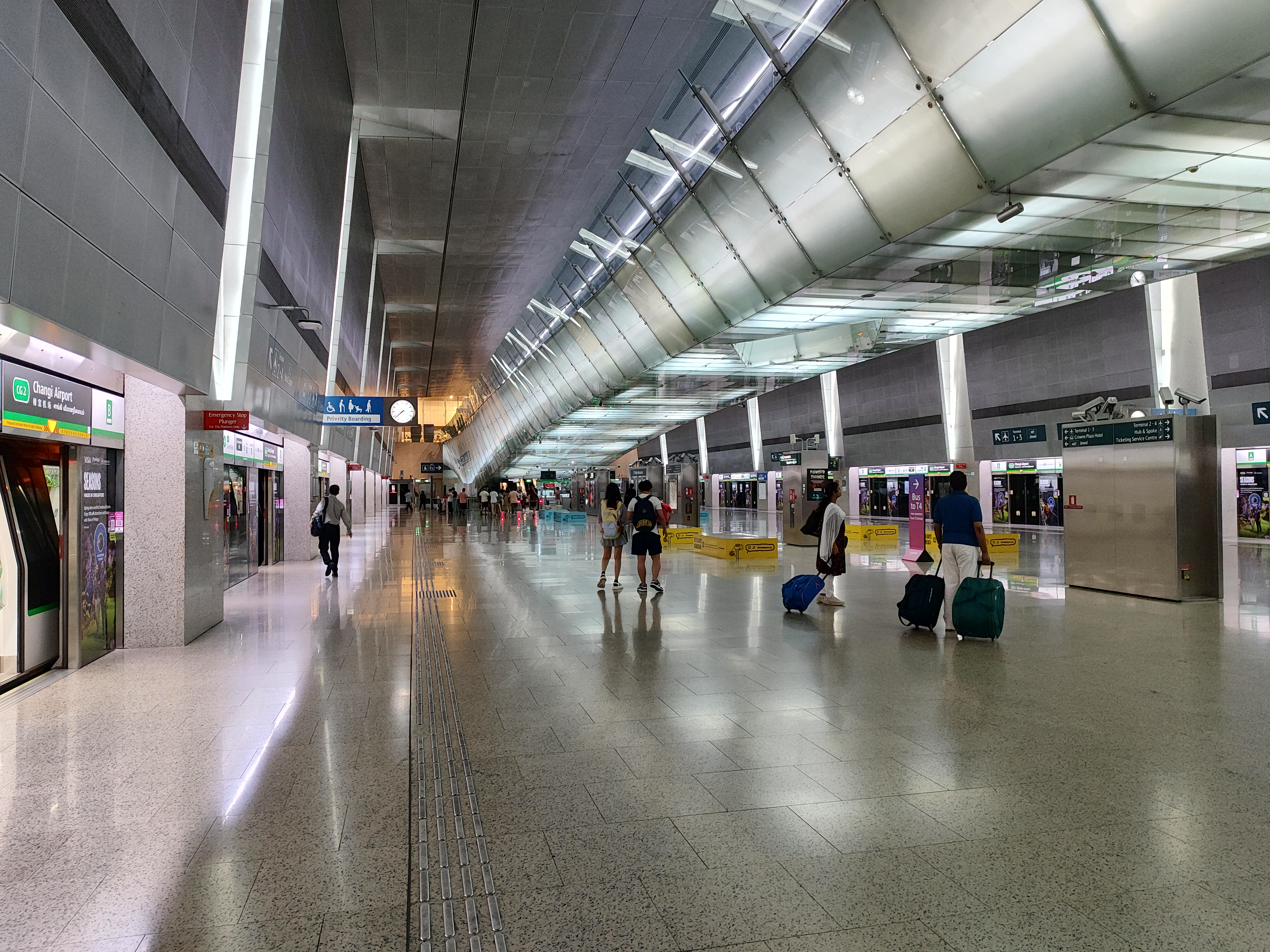
- Changi Airport station with the illuminated bridge spanning over the platform

General information
- Location: 70 Airport Boulevard, Singapore 819661
- Coordinates: 01°21′27″N 103°59′18″E
- System: Mass Rapid Transit (MRT) terminus
- Owner: Land Transport Authority
- Operator: SMRT Trains
- Line: East–West Line (until mid-2030s) Thomson–East Coast Line (from mid-2030s)
- Platforms: 2 (1 island platform)
- Tracks: 2
- Connections: Changi Airport Bus Terminal, Taxi

Construction
- Structure type: Underground
- Platform levels: 1
- Parking: Yes (Changi Airport, Jewel Changi Airport)
- Cycle facilities: Yes (Changi Airport)
- Accessible: Yes
- Architect: Skidmore, Owings and Merrill

History
- Opened: 8 February 2002; 24 years ago (as Changi Airport Branch Line)
- Opening: mid-2030s (Thomson–East Coast Line)

Passengers
- April 2024: 19,000 per day

Services
Preceding station	Mass Rapid Transit	Following station
Expo towards Tanah Merah	East–West Line Changi Airport Line	Terminus
Changi Terminal 5 towards Woodlands North	Thomson–East Coast Line Future service	Expo towards Tanah Merah
Track layout
Location
- Location within Singapore Rail

Changi Airport MRT station is an underground Mass Rapid Transit (MRT) station in Changi, Singapore. The station is the terminus of the Changi Airport branch of the East–West Line (EWL); it is operated by SMRT Trains and is built in an east–west orientation. The station directly connects to Terminals 2 and 3 of Changi Airport and serves other airport amenities including the retail complex of Jewel.

A rail connection to the airport had been planned in the 1980s but these plans were shelved due to the low financial viability of such a branch. With increased air traffic to Changi Airport and the proposed construction of Terminal 3 in 1994, the plans were revived. The current two-station branch line was finalised in 1996 and construction began in 1998. Changi Airport station opened on 8 February 2002 with lower passenger demand than expected; however, it continues to provide an alternative transport option to the airport. In May 2019, it was announced that Changi Airport station would be incorporated into the Thomson–East Coast Line by mid-2030s as it extends to the airport's fifth terminal.

Designed by Skidmore, Owings and Merrill, Changi Airport station includes elements that cater to airport travellers such as wider faregates at the platforms. The glass atrium walls at the ends of the station support an illuminated bridge that spans the island platform while allowing maximum sunlight into the station.

== History ==
=== Early plans ===
A direct MRT link to Changi Airport was first announced in March 1976 during the planning of the MRT network. In May 1982, the plans showed an MRT branch to Changi Airport. The branch was to be built after the completion of the initial MRT network. In a 1983 feasibility study, the Mass Rapid Transit Corporation (MRTC) concluded the level of passenger traffic was insufficient to justify such a branch. Plans for the connection were reviewed again in 1984 because the MRT system was built below budget. In 1985, a survey on transport patterns to the airport was conducted by an MRTC consultant team to assess the viability of an airport MRT connection. However, the consultants concluded in January 1986 that the connection was financially unfeasible in the immediate period because travellers preferred to commute to the airport by taxi. In the following year, Communications Minister Yeo Ning Hong announced that the planned spur would be unfeasible despite the completion of Terminal 2.

In March 1989, the Member of Parliament for Changi, Teo Chong Tee, called for the airport extension, saying it would serve the increased passenger demand for the airport. In response, Minister Yeo said an extension would be considered if there were development plans in the Changi area. Otherwise, the low demand might not meet operating costs. In 1991, he stated a connection would only be justified when annual passenger numbers using Changi Airport reached 50 million, and projections said the airport would handle only about 34 million passengers per year at the beginning of the 21st century. The minister also claimed the airport was already well-served by expressways with affordable taxi rates. In 1992, Communications Minister Mah Bow Tan said the government had already reserved the land needed for the possible route.

=== Finalisation of rail connection ===
In August 1994, the proposal for a rail link was reconsidered after airport use grew by 10% annually, surpassing the previous projections of 6–7%. With plans for a new terminal to manage passenger growth, the Civil Aviation Authority of Singapore (CAAS) urged the MRTC to reevaluate the proposal as they were concerned the roads serving the new terminal might be insufficient. The CAAS also suggested that the new link be built in tandem with the new terminal. The MRTC opened consultation studies on the airport link, which would branch off from the East–West Line (EWL) at Tanah Merah station but without intermediate stops.

After another feasibility study by the Land Transport Authority (LTA), Deputy Prime Minister Lee Hsien Loong announced on 15 November 1996 that the 6.4-kilometre (4.0 mi) branch would be built. The branch, which was projected to be completed in 2001, would run from Tanah Merah station and have an intermediate stop at Somapah (now Expo) to serve the Changi Business Park and the exhibition centre. There were no plans to extend the branch towards the cargo-and-engineering complexes due to low demand in the area. Teo, who had been advocating for the branch since 1987, was "overjoyed" and considered the announcement an "excellent piece of news".

=== Construction and opening ===
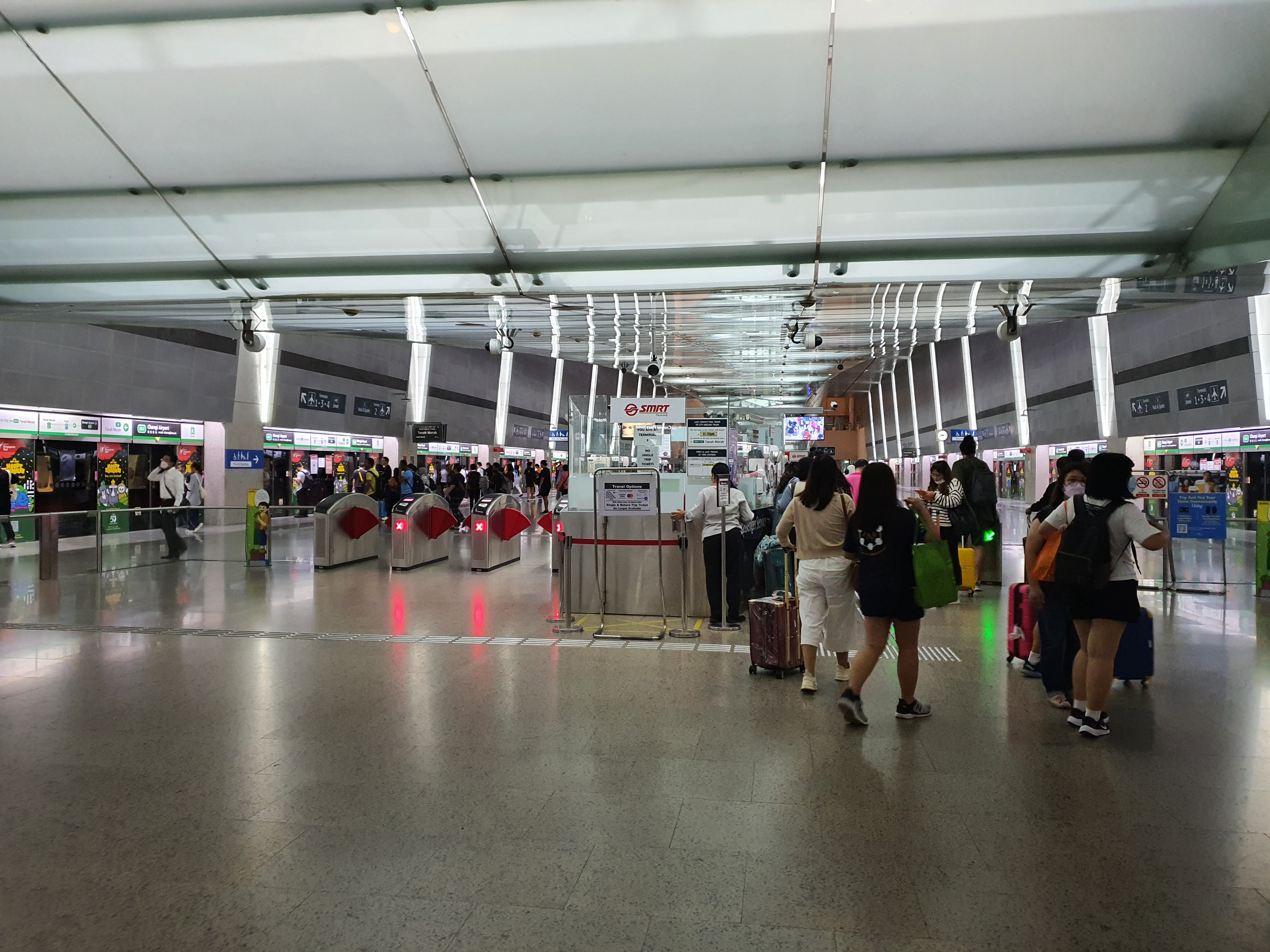
Changi Airport is one of the few stations where the concourse and faregates are on the same level as the platforms.

In October 1998, the contract for the construction of Changi Airport station was awarded to a joint venture between Kumagai Gumi and Sembawang Engineering and Construction for S$204.5 million (US$122.2 million). The contract included the construction of the station and associated tunnels, a new baggage tunnel between Terminals 2 and 3, and a new vehicular underpass to serve Terminal 3. CPG Consultants, which was designing Terminal 3, provided 20 staff to assist the LTA team on the line extension.

A groundbreaking ceremony was held on 29 January 1999. Speaking at the ceremony, Communications Minister Mah Bow Tan said the station's construction would require close collaboration between stakeholders such as the LTA, CAAS and the contractors. As the station was built in a sensitive area, top-down construction works had to be carefully planned to limit disruption to airport operations. Close monitoring was required to construct the 1 km-long (0.62 mi) tunnels leading to the station, which pass directly beneath the runway and airport terminal.

The roads connecting to the arrival and departure halls of Terminals 1 and 2 were rerouted west of the station site during the construction. The east side of the station was constructed first due to more complex deep excavation works near developments such as Terminal 2. Extensive foundation reconstruction was required for the overrun tunnels as they passed through an irregular pile layout beyond the east side of the station. The LTA dismissed the idea of mining the tunnels as the works were in shallow ground. Instead, open-cut excavation within diaphragm walls and ground treatment methods were adopted.

As part of the President's Challenge 2001, part of the charity walk went through the tunnel between Expo and Changi Airport stations. Changi Airport MRT station opened on 8 February 2002, and the official opening ceremony for the line extension was held at the station on 27 February 2002. When the station opened, passenger traffic has been moderate because bus transportation continued to be a popular means of cheap, direct transport for local airport and airline employees, and for travellers not living along the EWL. Many air travellers preferred to continue taking taxis or private transport because not all of the trains on the MRT had luggage racks. Taxi drivers said the station put them at a disadvantage, reporting a loss of 20% in earnings within the first month of station operations. At that time, the station had a daily ridership of 20,500 commuters. Despite developments built around the branch line to boost further ridership, it was not deemed cost-effective to run through services to the MRT. Since 2003, the branch was instead served by a shuttle service running from Tanah Merah to Changi Airport.

=== Incorporation into the TEL ===
The possibility of extending the Eastern Region Line to Changi Airport via the airport's Terminal 4 was first announced by LTA in May 2013 when Terminal 4 was under construction. The extension would have provided a more direct connection from the airport to the city. The Eastern Region Line was later merged into the Thomson–East Coast Line (TEL) in August 2014, and Transport Minister Khaw Boon Wan said in July 2016 the TEL extension to the airport might be completed at the same time as Terminal 5. On 25 May 2019, the LTA confirmed that the Changi Airport branch line will become part of the TEL when it is extended to Changi Airport from Sungei Bedok station via Terminal 5. This extension is expected to be completed in 2040.

The contract for the construction of twin-bored tunnels from Changi Airport station to Changi Airport Terminal 5 was awarded to Shanghai Tunnel Engineering Co (Singapore) Pte Ltd for S$321.7 million (US$240.07 million). Construction required tunnelling under a closed runway east of Terminal 2, which was completed in November 2022. On 29 April 2024, the LTA called a tender to modify the existing station, along with Tanah Merah and Expo stations, in preparation to integrate them into the TEL.

== Details ==
=== Services ===
Changi Airport station is served by the Changi Airport Branch of the EWL, which connects to the airport from Tanah Merah station as a shuttle service. The official station code is CG2, which changed from EW29. The next station towards Tanah Merah is Expo station. Being part of the EWL, the station is operated by SMRT Trains. Changi Airport station is planned to be served by the TEL when the line extends to the airport in 2040. Changi Airport station is located underneath Airport Boulevard and between Terminals 2 and 3 of the airport. The station also serves various airport amenities including Airport Police Division, Jewel Changi Airport and Crowne Plaza Hotel.

When the station first opened in 2002, it was served by a through service from Boon Lay station. On 22 July 2003, this service changed to a shuttle service in which trains from Changi Airport station terminated at Tanah Merah station. The station is open from 5:10 am to 12:10 am. The first train departs from Changi Airport station at 5:31 am on weekdays and Saturdays, and at 5:59 am on Sundays. The day's last train departs from the airport at 12:06 am. From Tanah Merah station, the day's first train towards Changi Airport station departs at 5:20 am on weekdays and Saturdays, and at 5:47 am on Sundays, and the day's last train towards the airport from Tanah Merah station departs at 11:50 pm. Headways between trains vary from 6 to 9 minutes.

=== Design ===
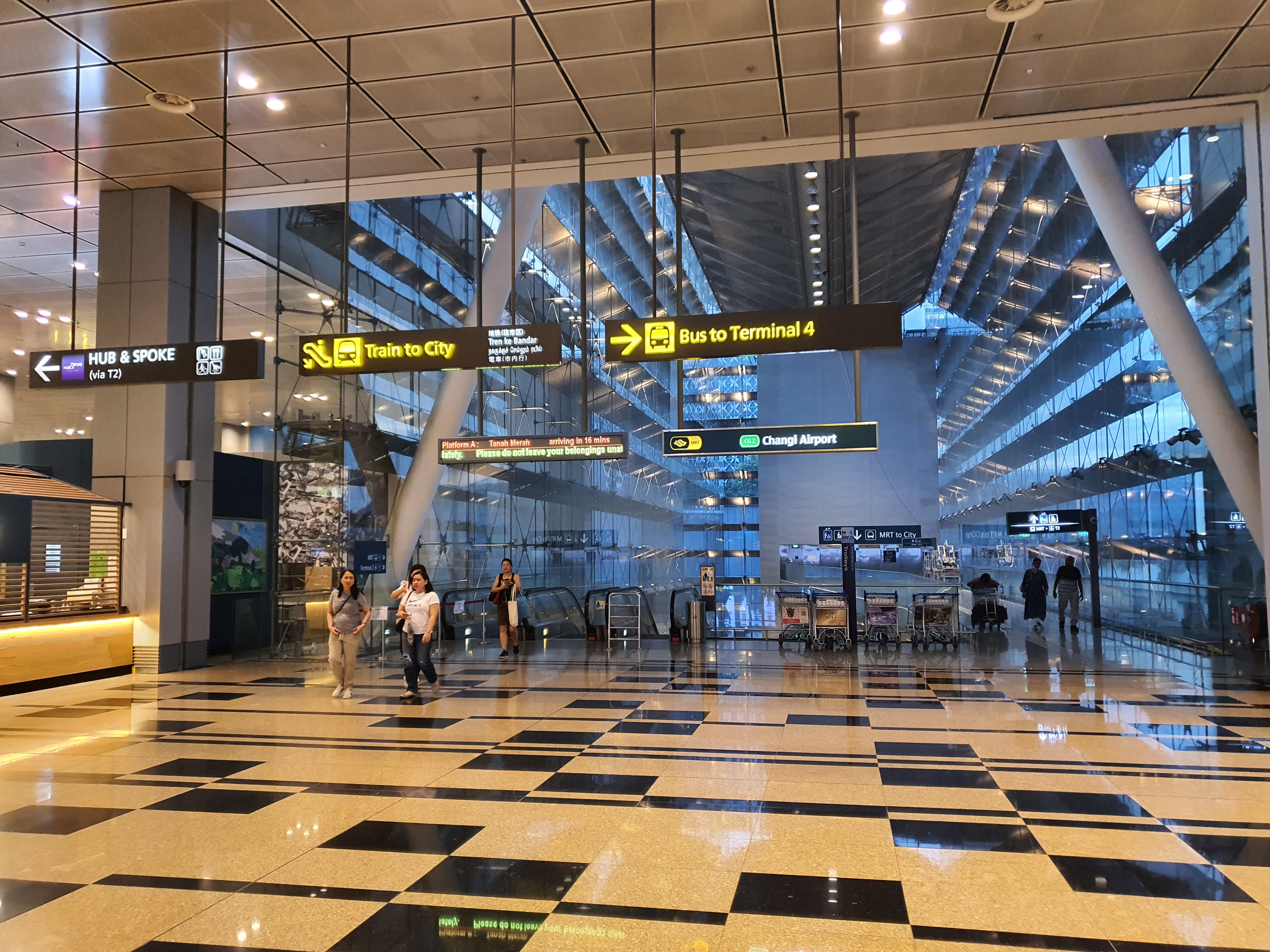
The panes of the glass atrium walls at Exit A of the station

Changi Airport station is 40 metres (130 ft) wide and 200 metres (660 ft) long, and was constructed at a depth of 18.5 metres (61 ft). The station, aligned in an east-west direction, has crossover tracks at its west and overrun tunnels beyond the east side of the station. American architectural firm Skidmore, Owings and Merrill designed the station, which include multiple design elements catering to airport travellers. The station has wide faregates for commuters with luggage. These faregates, which are located on the same level as the platforms, also allow easier access for wheelchair users. Changi Airport station was one of the first MRT stations to be wheelchair-accessible when it was first built, with lifts and ramps for barrier-free access. A tactile flooring system, consisting of tiles with raised, rounded-or-elongated studs, guides visually impaired commuters through the station.

The station is columnless but supported by platform-edge pillars each spaced 11.4 metres (37 ft) apart and an external diaphragm and lining wall along each length of the station. At the station's two entrances are glass atrium walls that support an illuminated, 150 m (490 ft) bridge spanning the island platform. The glass bridge allows unpaid transfer between the two terminals. At either end of the station is an atrium measuring approximately 60 m (200 ft) long by 36 m (118 ft) high. The glazing system and tensioned-cable network of the glass atria were structurally designed by engineering company Meinhardt Facades, with engineering input from Ove Arup and Partners.

The glass atria allow maximum sunlight into the station. The roof is supported only at its northern and southern ends, and a massive spine beam spine runs between the north and south. The spine is supported by a staggered structure made of reinforced concrete at one end and an A-frame column and stability truss at the other end. The facade panels are hung from vertical trusses at the end of each cantilever, and are supported by other cables that run diagonally and horizontally. The station design was awarded the 2004 American Architecture Award by Chicago Athenaeum.

A mural by students of ASPN Katong School is displayed at this station as part of SMRT's Comic Connect, a public art showcase of heritage-inspired murals commissioned by the operator. Besides Changi Airport, the artwork features landmarks of the Changi area including the Changi Village Hawker Centre, Changi Chalets and Changi Cottage, which was used as an office by Lee Kuan Yew during post-independence Singapore.
