= Loyang Tua Pek Kong Temple =

Temple in Loyang, Singapore

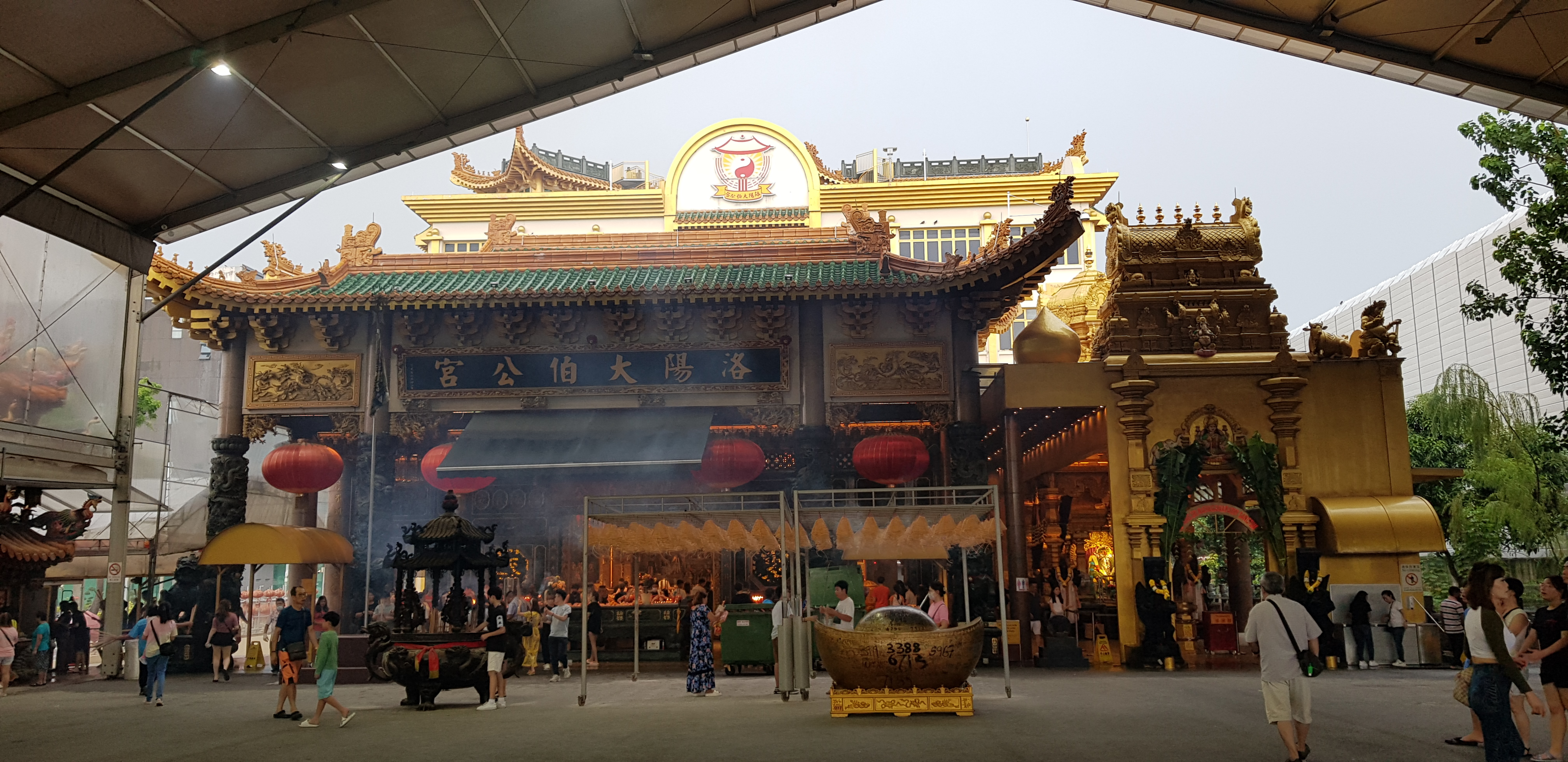
- The temple in 2024, showing the main prayer hall (left) and Datuk Kong/Hindu shrines (right)

- Location in Singapore

Religion
- Affiliation: Taoism; Buddhism; Hinduism; Malay mysticism

Location
- Location: Loyang, Singapore
- Coordinates: 1°22′15″N 103°58′11″E

Architecture
- Type: Temple
- Established: c. 1980

The Loyang Tua Pek Kong Temple is an architectural complex in Loyang, Singapore, known for housing both Taoist and Hindu deities as well as a Malay shrine. The temple had its roots in a small hut by the beach that was destroyed by a fire in 1996. It reopened further inland in 2000 before moving again seven years later.

== History ==
The temple was first illegally established near the coastline of Loyang, Singapore, in the 1980s. According to tradition, a few local fishermen elected to house Tua Pek Kong and other Taoist and Hindu deities that they had discovered at the beach in a makeshift zinc-plated shrine for public worship.

Soon after, a Malay shrine was added to the temple after the villagers at Loyang "received a sign" to do so. The initial structure and all of the original idols—bar that of Tua Pek Kong—were destroyed by a fire in 1996. A considerably larger temple was built near the original site in 2000 and christened the Loyang Tua Pek Kong Temple. It relocated to 20 Loyang Way—approximately 3 kilometres (1.9 mi) from the sea—in August 2007.

In December 2019, the temple was included as part of the 5.6 kilometres (3.5 mi) "architectural highlights walk" in the National Heritage Board's Pasir Ris Heritage Trail.

== Architecture ==
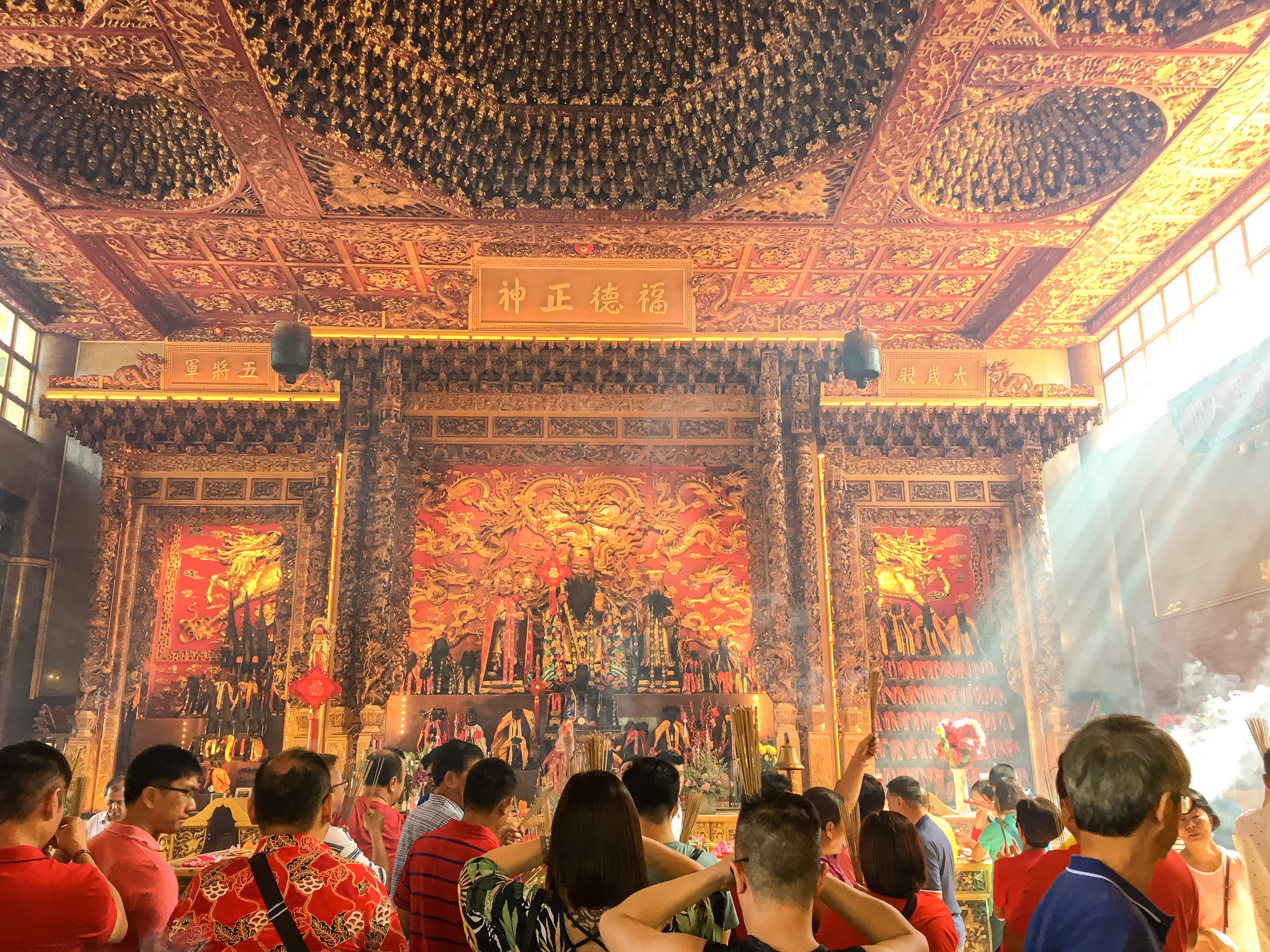
The main prayer hall of the temple

The main prayer hall of the temple houses the effigies of several Taoist deities, including Tua Pek Kong, the Jade Emperor, and the Tai Sui. It also contains a statue of Kṣitigarbha. A Hindu sanctum beside the prayer hall houses some sixteen statues of Mahaganapati. Wedged between the Taoist and Hindu sections of the temple is a gravesite-shaped Datuk Gong shrine that is only accessible to individuals who have not consumed pork on the day of their visitation. The temple complex can accommodate more than 100,000 visitors.
