= Expo MRT station =

Mass Rapid Transit station in Singapore

Expo CG1 DT35 博览 எக்ஸ்போ
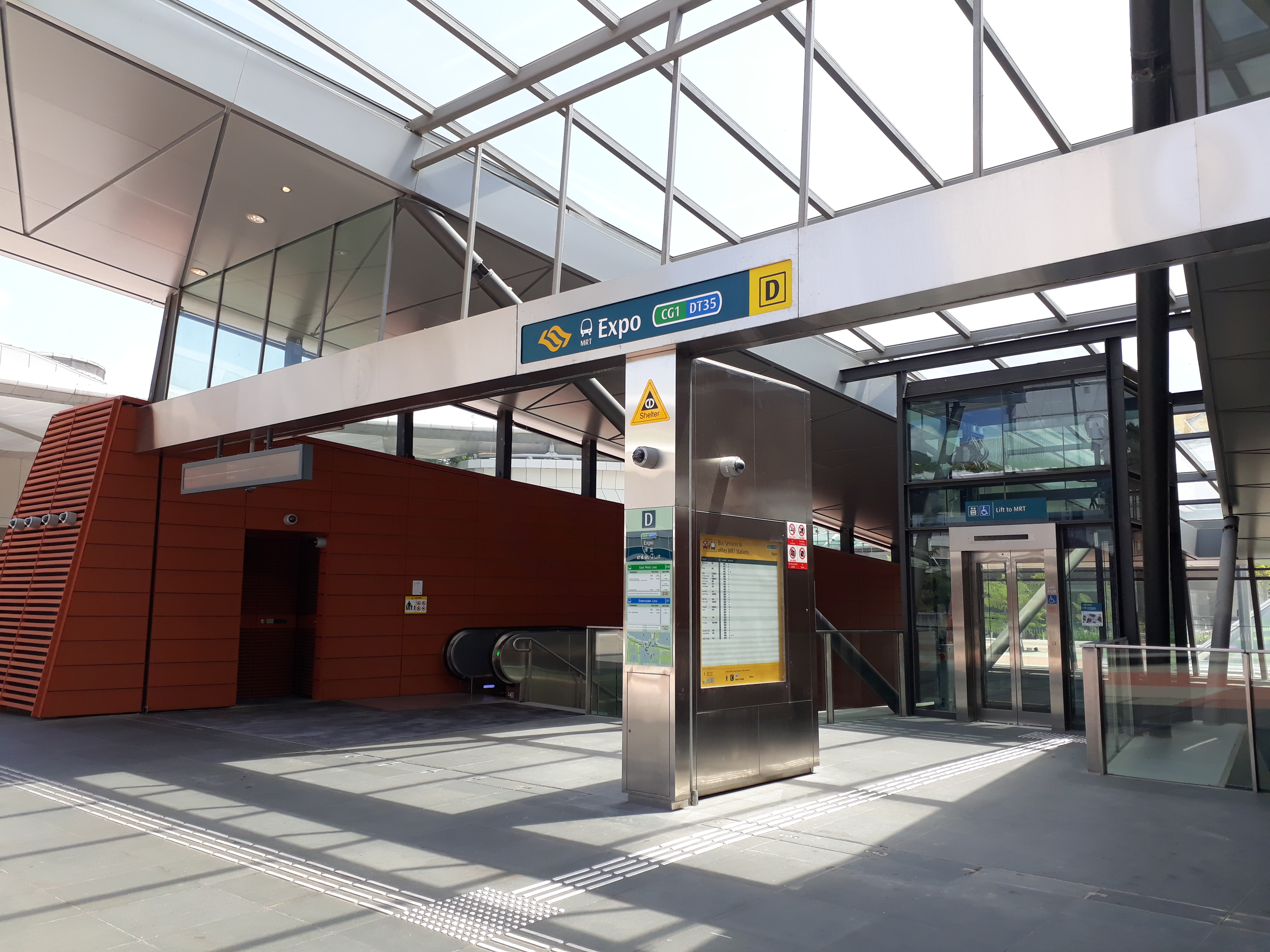
- Exit D of Expo station

General information
- Location: 21 Changi South Avenue 1, Singapore 486065 (EWL); 2 Expo Drive, Singapore 485985 (DTL)
- Coordinates: 01°20′07″N 103°57′43″E
- System: Mass Rapid Transit (MRT) interchange and terminus
- Owner: Land Transport Authority
- Operator: SMRT Trains (East–West Line); SBS Transit (Downtown Line)
- Line: East–West Line (until mid-2030s) Downtown Line Thomson–East Coast Line (from mid-2030s)
- Platforms: 4 (2 island platforms)
- Tracks: 4
- Connections: Bus, Taxi

Construction
- Structure type: Elevated (East–West Line); Underground (Downtown Line)
- Depth: 25 metres (82 ft)
- Platform levels: 2
- Parking: Yes (Changi City Point, Singapore Expo)
- Cycle facilities: Yes (External)
- Accessible: Yes
- Architect: Foster and Partners (East–West Line)

History
- Opened: 10 January 2001; 25 years ago (as Changi Airport Branch Line); 21 October 2017; 9 years ago (Downtown Line)
- Opening: mid-2030s (Thomson–East Coast Line)

Passengers
- June 2024: 13,515 per day

Services
Preceding station	Mass Rapid Transit	Following station
Tanah Merah Terminus	East–West Line Changi Airport Line	Changi Airport Terminus
Upper Changi towards Bukit Panjang	Downtown Line	Terminus
Upper Changi towards Bukit Panjang	Downtown Line Future service	Xilin towards Sungei Bedok
Changi Airport towards Woodlands North	Thomson–East Coast Line Future service	Tanah Merah Terminus
Track layout
Location
- Location within Singapore Rail

Expo MRT station is a Mass Rapid Transit (MRT) interchange station on the East–West Line (EWL) and Downtown Line (DTL) in the Tampines planning area, Singapore. The station lies between Changi City Point and the Singapore Expo, located along Changi South Avenue 1 at the junction of Expo Drive.

The station is part of the two-station branch line which extends from Tanah Merah to Changi Airport station. Plans to connect the EWL to Changi Airport were finalised in 1996 and construction began in 1999. The station opened on 10 January 2001, a year earlier than Changi Airport station. It later became the terminus for the DTL upon the completion of Stage 3 of that line in 2017. On 25 May 2019, it was announced that the station will be incorporated into the Thomson–East Coast Line (TEL), which is planned to extend to the airport's Terminal 5 by 2040.

== History ==
=== Changi Airport branch ===
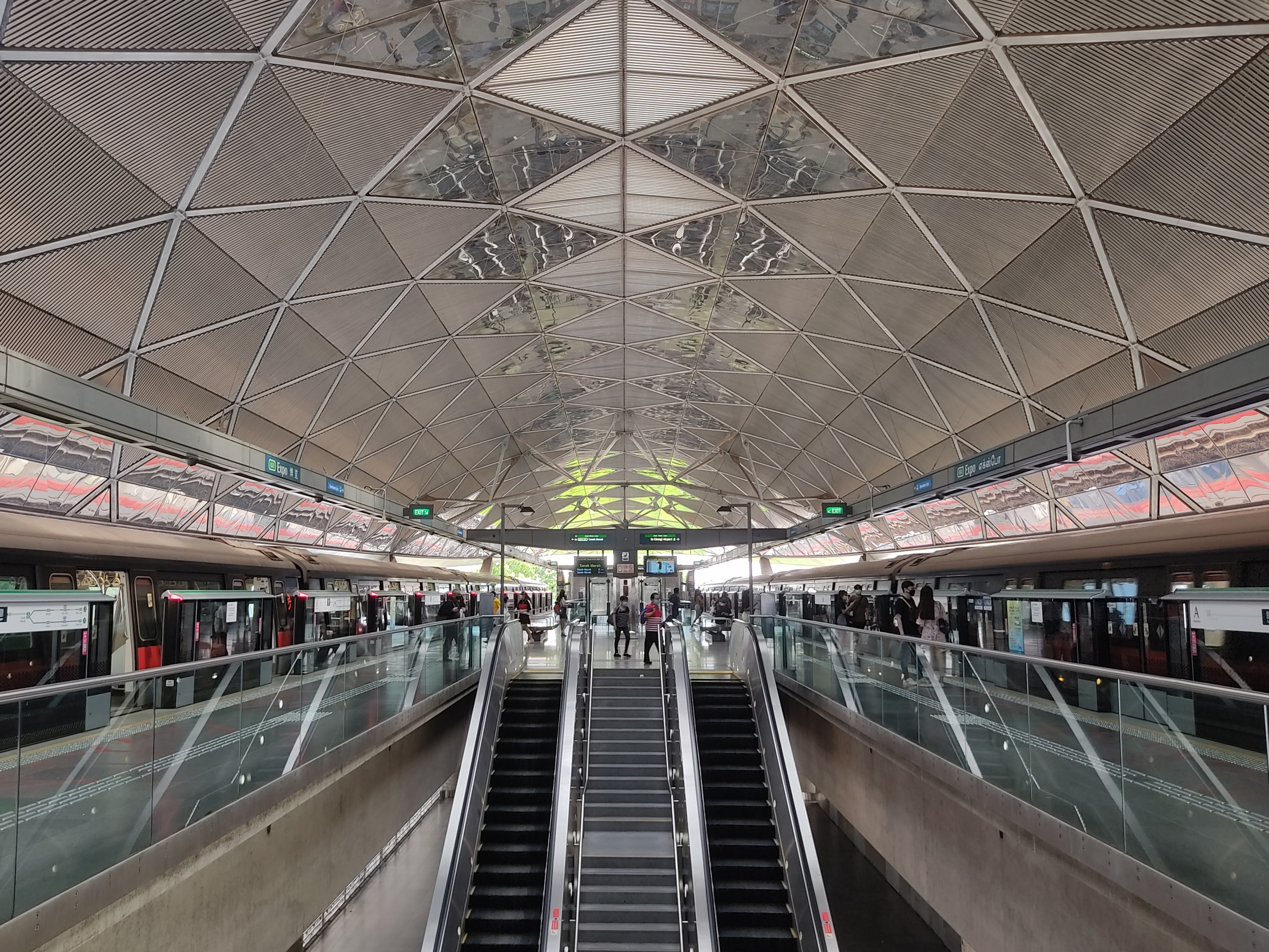
EWL (CGL) platforms of Expo station (Platforms A and B)

In 1994, there were plans to build a new rail connection to Changi Airport. The alignment of the two-station branch, which included Expo station, was finalised through an announcement by Deputy Prime Minister Lee Hsien Loong on 15 November 1996. Contract 502 for the construction of Expo station and 1.4 kilometres (0.87 miles) of track was awarded to a joint venture between Penta-Ocean Construction Limited and L&M Prestressing Pte Ltd for S$62.6 million (US$37.4 million).

The station opened on 10 January 2001 upon the request of Singapore Expo, a year before the opening of Changi Airport station. As part of the President's Challenge 2001 in September, a part of a charity walk went through the tunnel between Expo and Changi Airport stations. The branch line was later extended to Changi Airport when that station opened on 8 February 2002. As with most of the older above-ground stations along the EWL, the station was built without platform screen doors (PSDs). Expo station was the last EWL station to have the half-height PSDs installed on 31 August 2011.

=== Downtown Line ===
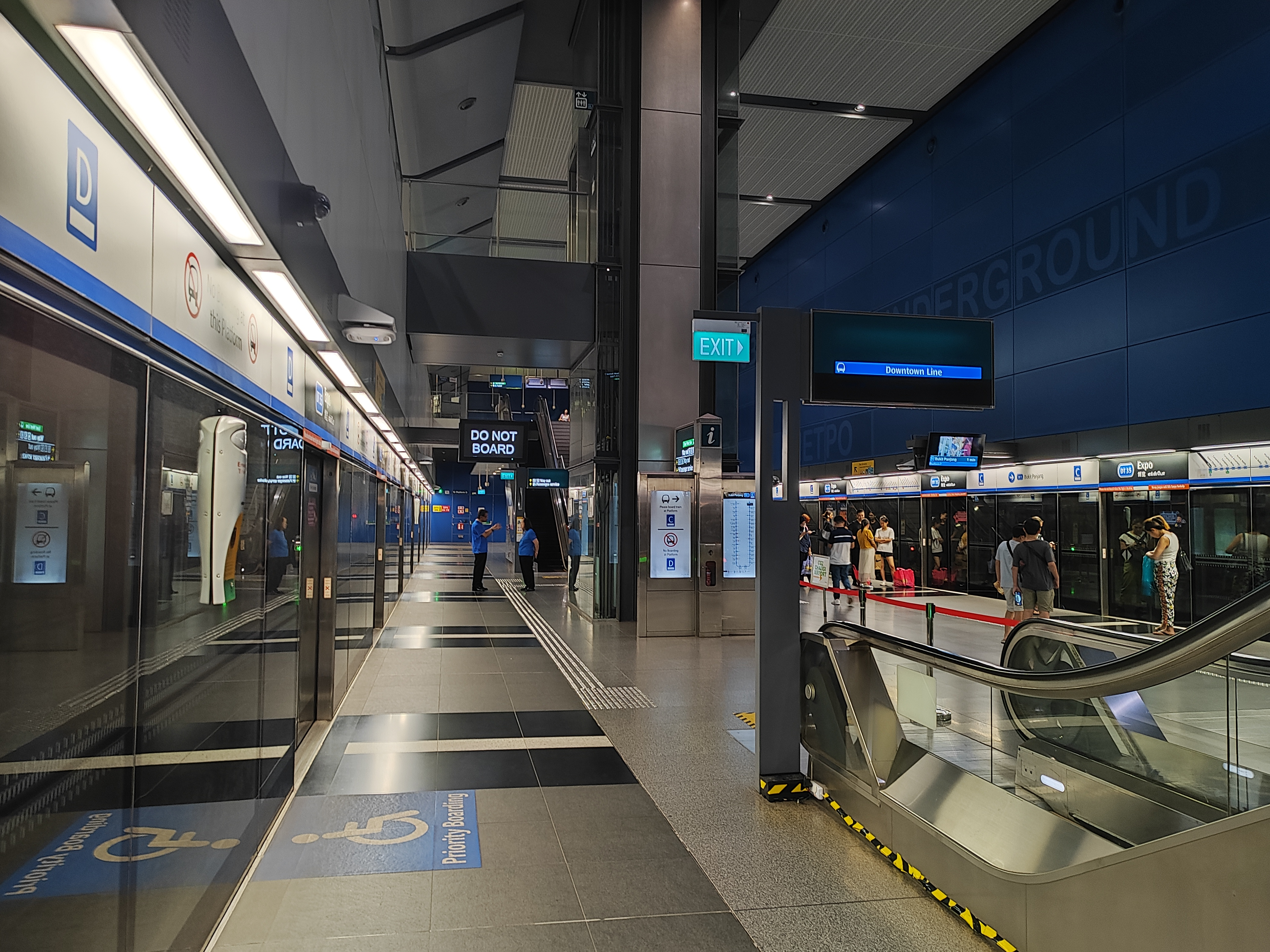
DTL platforms of Expo station (Platforms C and D)

On 20 August 2010, the Land Transport Authority (LTA) that Stage 3 of the DTL (DTL3) would terminate at Expo station, where the DTL would interchange with the EWL. Contract 922 for the design and construction of Expo station and the overrun tunnels was awarded to Samsung C&T Corporation for S$211.35million (US$168 million) in May 2011. On 28 November 2011, the LTA marked the start of construction of DTL3 with a groundbreaking ceremony at Expo station.

To facilitate the construction of the DTL station and its tunnels, part of Changi South Avenue 1 towards Somapah Road and Changi South Avenue 2, together with a short section of Expo Drive, were temporarily closed to traffic from 1 September 2012 to May 2017. The construction of the station also involved the underpinning of two existing Expo MRT viaduct pier foundations. A transfer-beam was constructed before the excavation to support the two pillars and hydraulic jacks were installed on the transfer beam. Subsequently, the existing pilers were cut away. The underpinning works were carried out successfully without disruption to the EWL's operations.

On 31 May 2017, the LTA announced that the station, together with the rest of DTL3, would be opened on 21 October that year. Passengers were offered a preview of the station along with the other DTL 3 stations through an open house on 15 October. Transport minister Khaw Boon Wan presided over the DTL3's opening ceremony held at this station.

=== Future plans ===
The DTL is projected to be extended from Expo station via Xilin to Sungei Bedok MRT station as part of the DTL3 extension (DTL3e). Expected to be completed in 2026, the extension was constructed in tandem with the adjacent East Coast Integrated Depot. The extension is expected to provide better public transport service to Changi Business Park. On 25 May 2019, as part of the Land Transport Masterplan 2040, the LTA announced that the stretch between Tanah Merah and Changi Airport would also be part of the proposed Thomson–East Coast line (TEL) extension to Changi Airport from Sungei Bedok station via the future Changi Airport Terminal 5. On 29 April 2024, the LTA called a tender to modify the existing station, along with Tanah Merah and Changi Airport stations, in preparation for their conversion to being part of the TEL.

== Station details ==
=== Location ===
As the name suggests, the station serves the convention centre of Singapore Expo. The elevated EWL station is located along Changi South Avenue 1 while the DTL station is underneath the junction of the road and Expo Drive. In addition to the Singapore Expo, the station serves the retail development of Changi City Point, as well as various offices in Changi Business Park such as UE Bizhub East, IBM Place and DBS Asia Hub.

=== Services ===
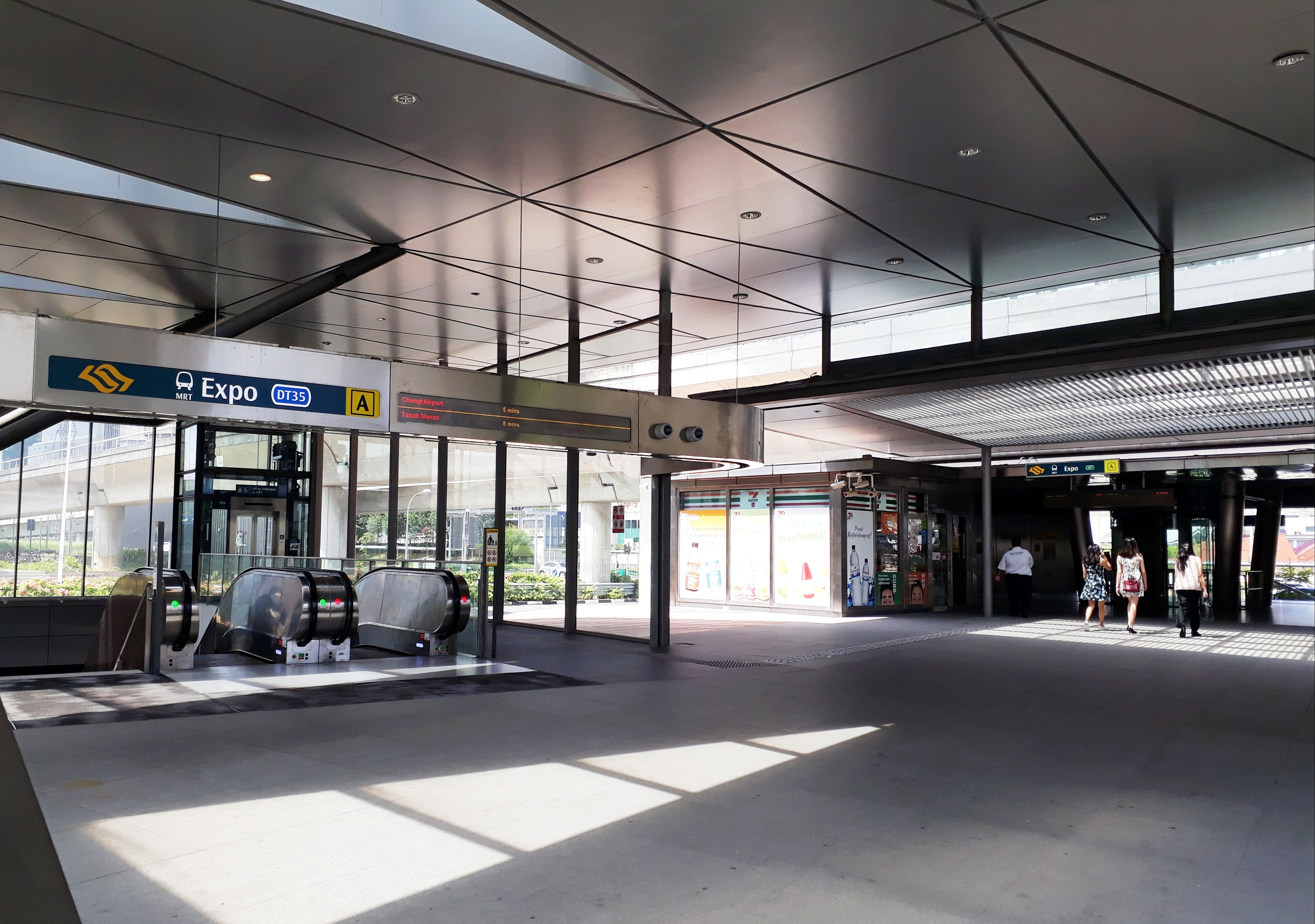
Exit A of the station leading to the DTL and EWL platforms

The station is an interchange station on the EWL and DTL. On the EWL, the station is between the Tanah Merah and Changi Airport stations on the Changi Airport branch. Train services to Expo station initially operated as a 2-station shuttle service from Tanah Merah station, then briefly converted to a through service from Boon Lay station when the branch extended to Changi Airport station. However, due to ridership falling below expectations, the service was reverted into shuttle mode on 22 July 2003. On the DTL, the station is the current terminus on the line, with the next station being Upper Changi station. The DTL extension to Sungei Bedok is scheduled to open in 2026; the next station in that direction will be Xilin.

=== Architecture ===
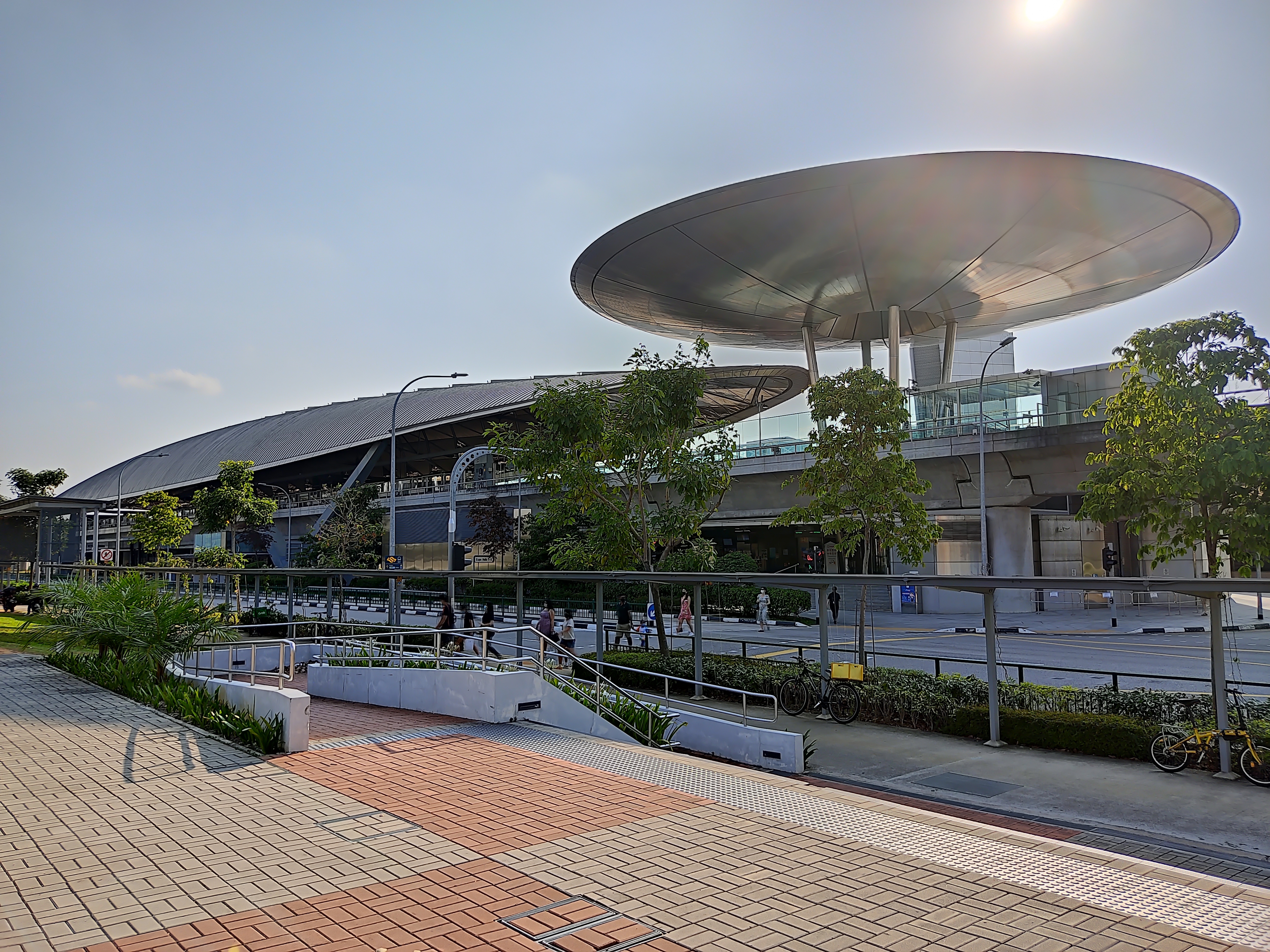
Exterior of the EWL station

The elevated EWL station is designed by British architectural firm Foster and Partners. The station contains a stainless-steel roof over the concourse and ticket level, measuring 40 metres (130 ft) in diameter, which overlaps with a 130-metre (430 ft) long titanium roof over the platform level. The roof above the concourse reflects sunlight into the station, reducing the need for artificial lighting, while the platform canopy deflects heat from the sun, cooling the platform by up to 4 °C (7.2 °F) compared to its surroundings. The materials of the roofs were adapted to Singapore's climate.

The station's large interior allows natural lighting and ventilation. Expo station is the first on the MRT that did not require paintwork as the interior is mainly stone, glass or metal. The station contains a lift in a transparent shaft, as well as highly illuminated energy-saving escalators, which complement the "futuristic outlook" of the station. The futuristic design is intended to reflect the country's willingness to experiment with new ideas and technology, symbolising the "thriving world-class city" that Singapore was projected to become in the 21st century.

The DTL station design by Greenhilli utilises "interconnectivity, spatial volume, asymmetry, daylight, colour [and] super-graphics" to signify transition and movement. The station is designed to allow commuters to navigate around the station easily while making it identifiable to the locality. The station's entrances and auxiliary buildings are designed in a "sculptural and dynamic" manner, which the designers believed would give the impression of "gateways" into the neighbourhood. The station was praised for its "excellent design" for its "refined" detailing and ingenious usage of colours and textures, while fulfilling the "restrictive" demands around the area. The station design won the Singapore Institute of Architects Design Awards 2020, with the institute's jury citing the station's "elegant resolution of architecture".

=== Artwork ===
A Banquet

The DTL station features A Banquet, an artwork created by Yeo Chee Kiong. It was commissioned as part of the MRT network's Art in Transit programme, a showcase that integrates public artwork in the MRT network. The large 3D artwork depicts two reflective isometric chairs and a bulbous speech balloon, which signifies both the importance of communication during periods of technological advancement and the spirit of free trade. Yeo said, "Expo is where business is done, the speech balloons show the kind of conversations and dialogues which people have, and the chairs show where business takes place." With the surrounding colours of the station reflected in the artwork's shiny surfaces, it transformed them into two sets of "magnificent kaleidoscopes" which also symbolises cultural exchange.

== In popular culture ==
The station is featured in the tvN series Little Women.
