= Upper Changi MRT station =

Mass Rapid Transit station in Singapore

Upper Changi DT34 樟宜上段 அப்பர் சாங்கி
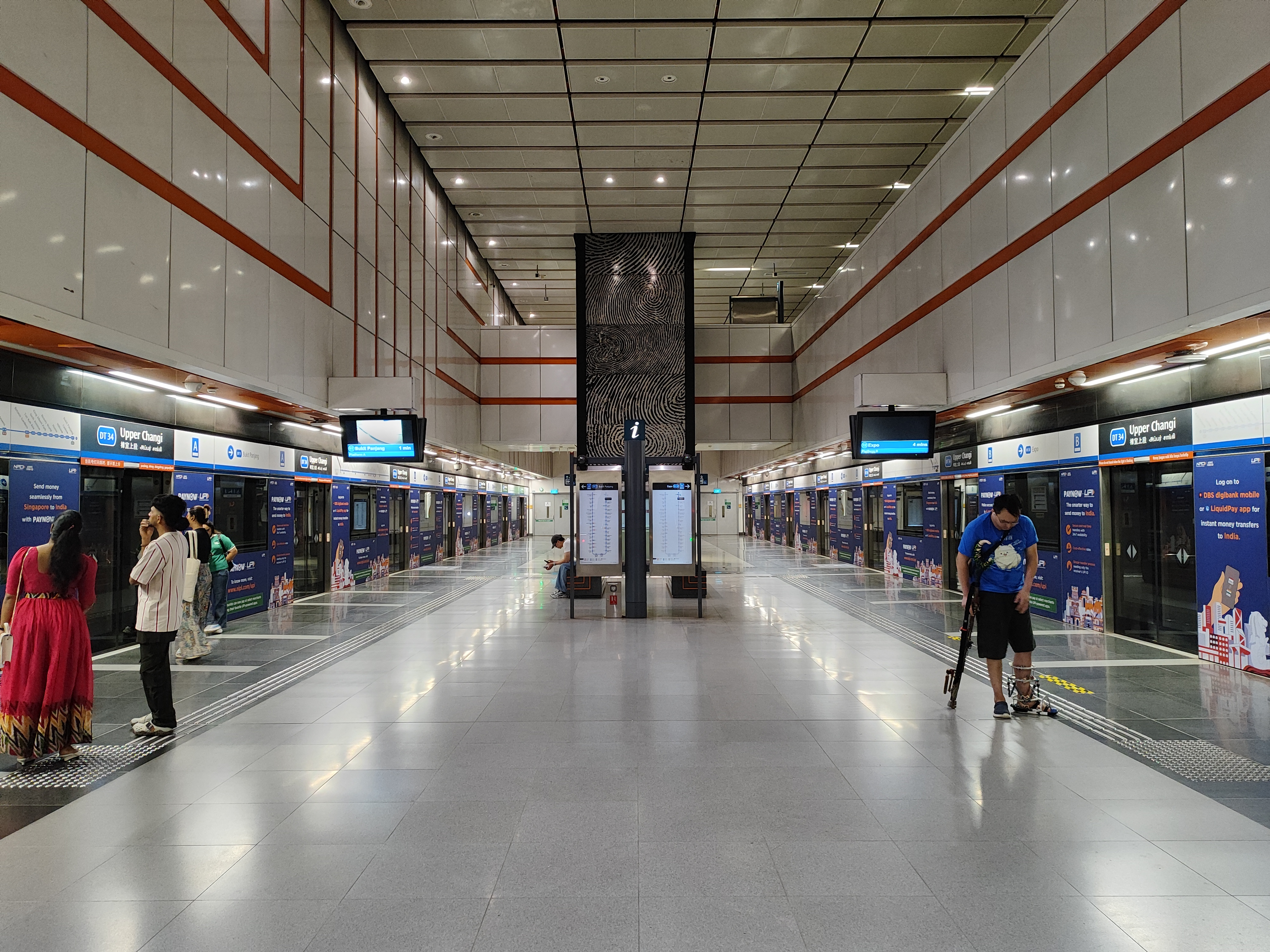
- Platform level of Upper Changi station

General information
- Location: 690 Upper Changi Road East, Singapore 485990
- Coordinates: 01°20′31″N 103°57′41″E
- System: Mass Rapid Transit (MRT) station
- Owner: Land Transport Authority
- Operator: SBS Transit
- Line: Downtown Line
- Platforms: 2 (1 island platform)
- Tracks: 2
- Connections: Bus, Taxi

Construction
- Structure type: Underground
- Platform levels: 1
- Accessible: Yes

Other information
- Station code: UPC

History
- Opened: 21 October 2017; 9 years ago
- Former names: Somapah

Passengers
- June 2024: 4,562 per day

Services
Preceding station	Mass Rapid Transit	Following station
Tampines East towards Bukit Panjang	Downtown Line	Expo Terminus
Track layout
Location
- Location within Singapore Rail

Upper Changi MRT station is an underground Mass Rapid Transit station on the Downtown Line in Tampines planning area, Singapore, located under Upper Changi Road East.

The station serves residential estates in the vicinity and the campus of the Singapore University of Technology and Design, which is linked via an underground linkway. The station, along with Fort Canning, is one of the longest stations along the line, at 205 meters.

== History ==
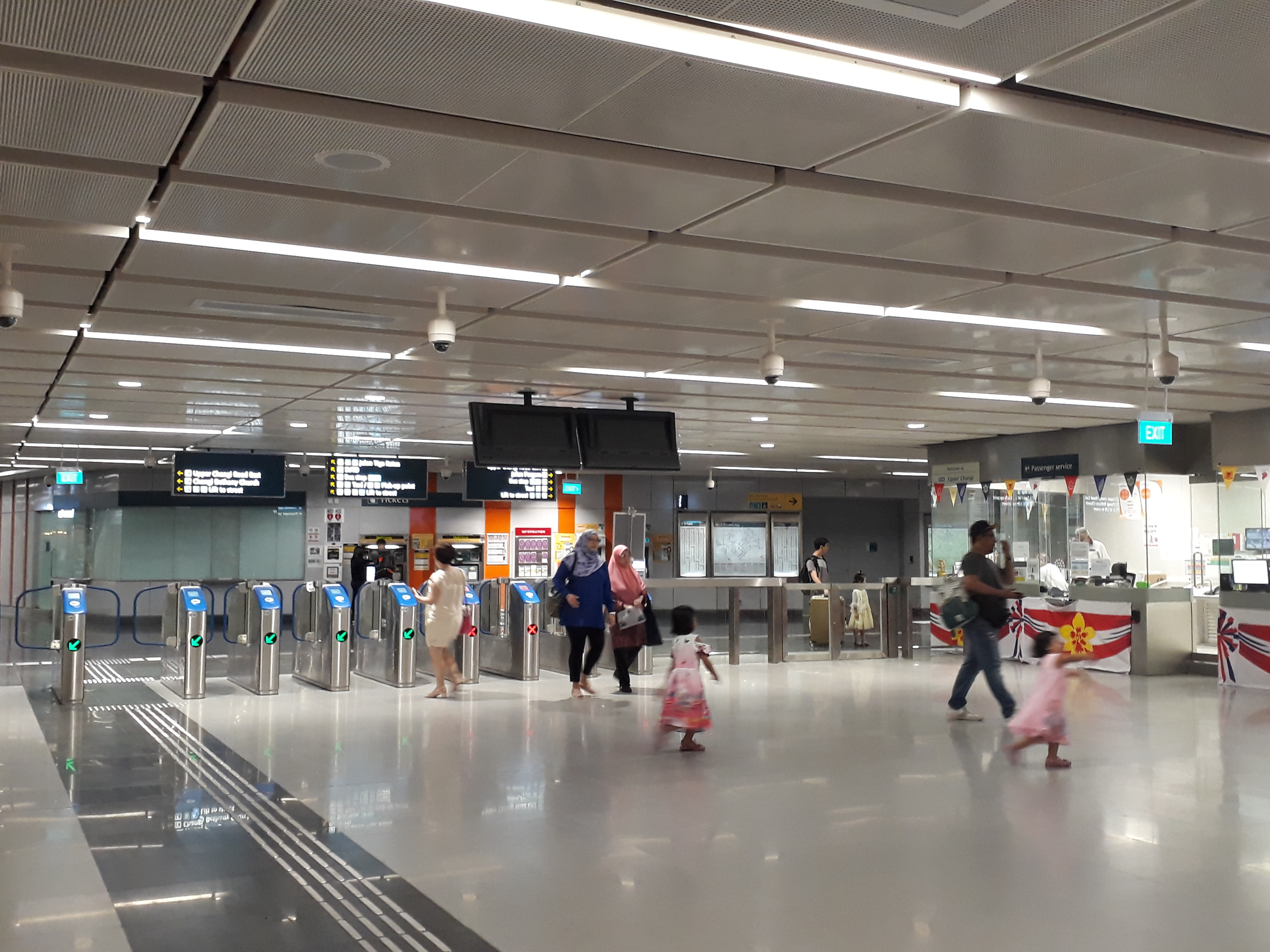
Concourse level of Upper Changi MRT station

Construction of the station started in October 2011. During the construction, a Shell petrol station was acquired and demolished, and Upper Changi Road East was realigned. Its working name was Somapah, named after Somapah Road, which is nearby.

Contract 923 for the design and construction of Upper Changi Station and 892.1-metre (2,927 ft) crossover tunnels from Upper Changi to Expo stations was awarded to Samsung C&T Corporation at a sum of S$256.98 million in August 2011. Another contract, Contract 923A for the design and construction of tunnels between Tampines East and Upper Changi stations, was awarded to Shanghai Tunnel Engineering Co. Ltd at a contract value of S$91.13 million.

On 24 April 2014, there was a depression of a section of Upper Changi Road East, causing a tipper truck to sink in. The driver was not injured and there was no other injuries. Traffic had been diverted, with two lanes closed, while the Land Transport Authority (LTA) carried out reinstatement works.

The station opened on 21 October 2017 along with other Downtown Line Stage Three stations, as announced by the Land Transport Authority on 31 May that year.
