= Changi City Point =

Shopping mall in Singapore

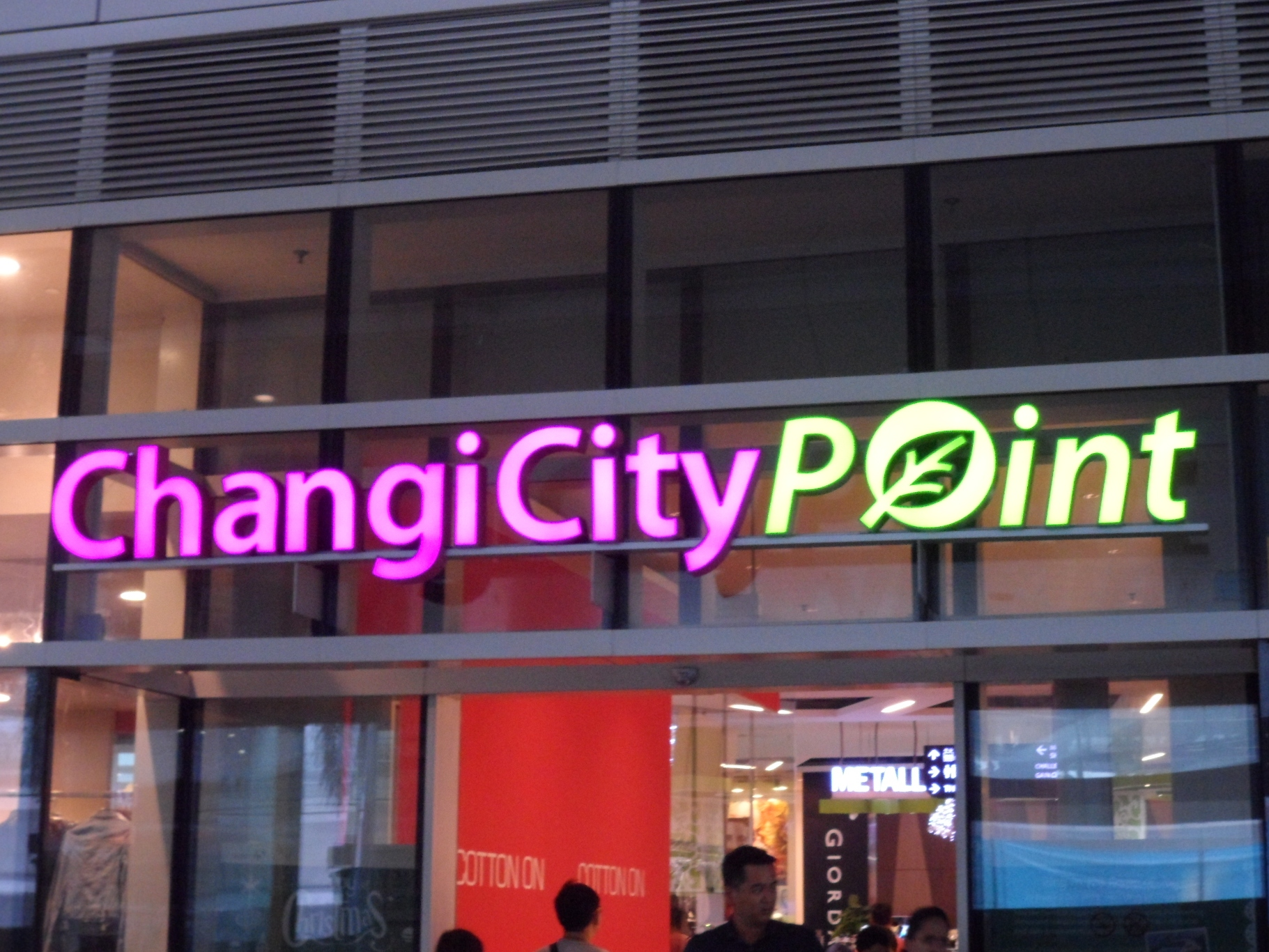
- Location: Changi Business Park, Singapore
- Coordinates: 1°20′3.48″N 103°57′45.72″E
- Address: 5 Changi Business Park Central 1, Singapore 486038
- Opened: 6 November 2011; 15 years ago
- Developer: Ascendas Land; Frasers Property (until 2023 Oct); The Elegant Group (from 2023 Nov)
- Manager: The Elegant Group
- Owner: The Elegant Group
- Num. of stores: 140
- Num. of anchor tenants: 7
- Floor area: 650,000 square feet (60,000 m^{2})
- Floors: 4
- Public transit: CG1 DT35 Expo; SBS Transit Service: 20, Go-Ahead Service: 118
- Website: www.changicitypoint.com.sg

Changi City Point (Chinese: 樟城坊) is a shopping mall located in the vicinity of Changi Business Park, Singapore. It was constructed from June 2010, and completed in November 2011. It is known for its selection of outlet stores.

In 2014, Changi City Point was sold by joint owners, Ascendas Frasers and Ascendas Development, to Frasers Centrepoint Trust (FCT) for $305 million. On 1 November 2023, Changi City Point was bought by The Elegant Group for $338 million.

== See also ==
- List of shopping malls in Singapore
