= Land Transport Authority =

Government agency in Singapore

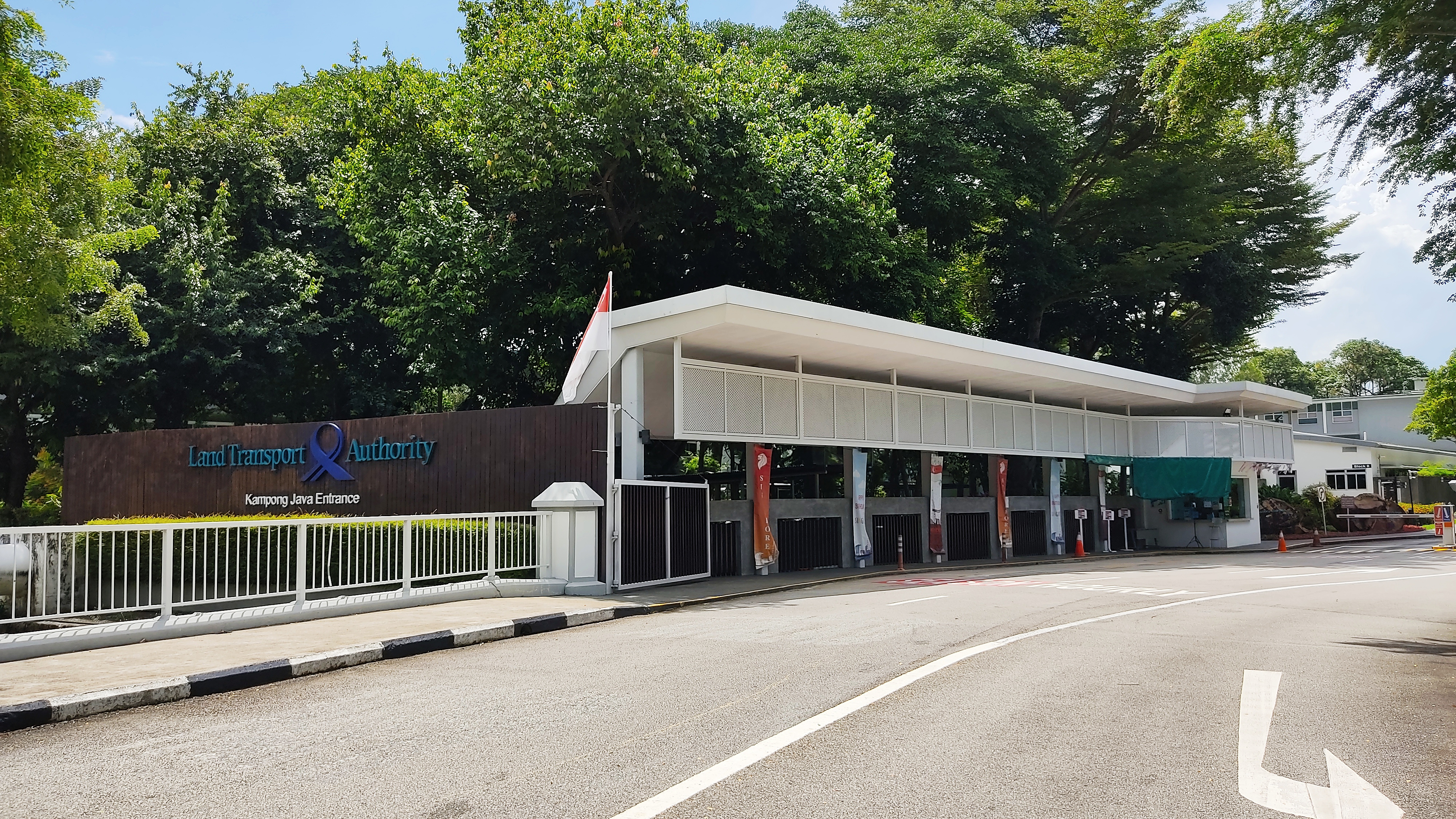
- Kampung Java Entrance to Land Transport Authority (LTA) headquarters

Agency overview
- Formed: 1 September 1995; 31 years ago
- Preceding agencies: Registry of Vehicles; Mass Rapid Transit Corporation; Roads & Transportation Division of the Public Works Department; Land Transportation Division of the Ministry of Communications
- Jurisdiction: Government of Singapore
- Headquarters: 1 Hampshire Road, Singapore 219428; 1°18′31″N 103°50′55″E
- Agency executives: Alan Chan, Chairman; Ng Lang, Chief Executive
- Parent agency: Ministry of Transport (Singapore)
- Child agency: Several
- Website: www.lta.gov.sg
- Agency ID: T08GB0027D

The Land Transport Authority (LTA) is a statutory board under the Ministry of Transport of the Government of Singapore.

== History ==
=== Incorporation ===
In March 1995, Communications Minister Mah Bow Tan announced that a new statutory board, the Land Transport Authority (LTA), would be established to oversee all matters related to rail and road transportation. The LTA would be a merger of the roads and transport division of the Public Works Department, the Registry of Vehicles and the land transport division of the Ministry of Communications. The proposed agency was planned to be established within the next two years. With the passing of the Land Transport Authority of Singapore Bill in August that year, the LTA was established on 1 September 1995 with Fock Siew Wah as its first chairman.

=== 1996 Land Transport White Paper ===
On 2 January 1996, the LTA published the 1996 Land Transport White Paper, titled "A World Class Land Transport System". It outlined the government plans. Changes to existing schemes were proposed along with schemes were introduced across various transport sectors. This included the Electronic Road Pricing (ERP) scheme, which eventually become ubiquitous in the city state.

==== 1996 Rail Financing Framework ====
The 1996 Rail Financing Framework was a scheme that set out the financing framework of the rail transport system. In the white paper, it was phrased that the financing framework of the rail transport system would eventually be run on the basis of partnership, which the government and its regulatory authority would provide the assets and infrastructure (which remain fully owned by the regulatory authority), with commuters paying for the operating costs and operators extracting efficiency dividends within standards and fares set by the regulatory authority.

The framework allowed for an open up of the rail transport market with the operation aspects of the industry no longer tied to the authorities, allowing for more autonomy of the incumbent operator and new operators to enter the market. This also laid the foundation for the restructure and flotation of SMRT Corporation, previously a state-owned incumbent operator under the name Mass Rapid Transit Corporation, in 2000. Subsequently, the MRT logo was replaced in 2001 into the yellow and green logo and was designed after the privatisation of SMRT Corporation and SBS currently operates the North East Line, Sengkang LRT and Punggol LRT.

The framework was revised in 2008 as the New Rail Financing Framework (NRFF), which saw the regulatory authority re-assuming the full ownership of all rail assets, where the ownership and maintenance of which were previously held responsible under the individual operators.

== Changes to public transport ==
To meet with the increasing number of commuters in Singapore, Land Transport Authority exercises on new changes over time.

=== Rail ===
LTA is responsible for the development of the rapid transit system and the expansion of the rail network. It aims to double the rail network by 2030. Since 2008, LTA has increased the length of Singapore's rail network from 138 km to about 180 km with the opening of the Boon Lay Extension in 2009, the Circle Line from 2009 to 2011 and the Circle Line Extension in 2012. Downtown Line, Thomson–East Coast Line are underway towards completion, with Jurong Region Line and Cross Island Line under construction.

Request	Line	Achieved on
To build the MRT station at Bras Basah, Esplanade and Promenade and to reduce overcrowding at City Hall and Raffles Place, since September 2007.	Circle MRT line	April 2010
To provide direct Circle Line connectivity from Buona Vista to HarbourFront and from Bishan to Buona Vista, since January 2011.	Circle MRT line	October 2011
To provide direct Downtown Line connectivity from Telok Ayer to Bugis, since January 2013.	Downtown MRT line	December 2013
To provide direct Downtown Line connectivity from Bukit Panjang to Bugis, to reduce overcrowding on Service 190 since November 2013.	Downtown MRT line	December 2015
To provide train service to Tuas.	East West MRT line	June 2017
To ease overcrowding in Tampines MRT Station, Paya Lebar MRT Station, Lavender MRT Station and Bugis MRT Station; provide direct connectivity from Tampines to Chinatown, Expo and Bukit Panjang and ease overcrowding of the East West Line from Tampines to City Hall.	Downtown MRT line	October 2017
To ease overcrowding in Johor-Singapore Causeway; expansion of Woodlands Checkpoint and to ease overcrowding in bus services 160, 170, 170X and 950.	Johor Bahru–Singapore Rapid Transit System	2026 (estimated)
To provide train service connection from Boon Lay to NTU.	Jurong Region MRT line	2029 (estimated)
To provide train service connectivity in Serangoon North, Serangoon Gardens, Pasir Ris East, Defu, Loyang and Bright Hill.	Cross Island MRT line	2030 (estimated)
To provide train service connectivity from Pasir Ris to Punggol.	Cross Island MRT line	2032 (estimated)
To provide train service connectivity in Turf City, and additional MRT line along Clementi to King Albert Park.	Cross Island MRT line	2032 (estimated)

Half-height platform screen doors were installed in all 36 elevated stations in 2012 for the safety of passengers and to reduce delays in train service from track intrusions. HVLS fans are also installed at all elevated stations starting from 1 June 2012 and ending on 6 January 2013.

After some MRT delays in late 2025 resulted in commuters' complaints that the delays were not announced on social media, the LTA stated on 3 December 2025 that the LTA, SMRT and SBS would focus on a "more localised approach to communicate minor delays" of under 30 minutes by providing "localised communications" at MRT stations affected by the delays. The Straits Times then surveyed 44 commuters who generally objected to the failure to announce the delays on social media, as only discovering about the delays at the affected MRT stations would make it too late to plan alternative routes, with more than half of the commuters preferring social media announcements for the delays. On 12 December 2025, the LTA stated that it would provide a new website for real-time information on both major and minor MRT delays, but maintained that it would not announce minor delays on social media.

=== Bus ===
LTA took on the role of the bus route planning with the introduction of Bus Services Enhancement Programme (BSEP) and Bus Connectivity Enhancement Programme (BCEP). Under BSEP, about 80 new services are being introduced and 1,000 buses are being added over five years.

Town	Request	Service	Achieved on
Ang Mo Kio	To provide a new express bus connection from Ang Mo Kio to Shenton Way via City Hall and Raffles Place.	652 (Under BSEP)	January 2014
Ayer Rajah	Double decker buses are no longer deployed on this service since October 2011.	91	October 2011
Ayer Rajah	Amended via Ayer Rajah Avenue (one-north MRT Station), Fusionopolis Way and Portsdown Road instead of North Buona Vista Road.	95	
Bedok	Amended via Bedok North Road and Bedok North Street 2 to increase bus connectivity.	18	November 2011
Bedok	To provide bus connectivity from Chai Chee (Ping Yi Greens BTO) to Kembangan.	26	June 2016
Bishan	Due to declining demand for the Thomson-East Coast Line, it was being shortened via Marymount Road, Shunfu Road, Sin Ming Road and Sin Ming Drive, loop at Sin Ming Drive instead of going to Marina Centre or Shenton Way.	162	December 2023
Bukit Batok	To provide bus connectivity from Bukit Batok to Bukit Batok Road (Loop) via Bukit Batok West.	944 (Under BSEP)	August 2017
Bukit Batok	To provide bus connectivity from Bukit Batok East Avenue 6, Bukit Batok West Avenue 6 and Bukit Batok West Avenue 8 (Skyline I and Skyline II @ Bukit Batok BTO) to Beauty World MRT Station.	66	June 2019
Bukit Batok	To provide bus connectivity from Bukit Batok to Jurong East.	990 (Under BSEP)	November 2014
Bukit Batok	To provide bus connectivity from Bukit Batok to Tengah via Bukit Batok West.	992	September 2023
Bukit Merah/Sentosa	To provide bus connectivity from Bukit Purmei to Sentosa and Resorts World Sentosa.	123	July 2017
Bukit Panjang	To provide growing bus capacity from Bukit Panjang developments to Orchard Road.	972 (Under BSEP)	November 2013
Bukit Panjang	To provide bus connectivity from Bukit Panjang via Dairy Farm Road to Hume Avenue.	973	February 2017
Buona Vista/Ayer Rajah	Sunday bus operations were added due to Normanton Park redevelopment.	92	August 2024
Buona Vista/Ayer Rajah	To provide bus connectivity from Normanton Park to Bukit Merah Bus Interchange via Queensway.	92	
Changi	To provide bus connectivity from Flora Road, Changi North and Changi Prison to Tampines.	4 (Under BSEP)	March 2013
Changi	To provide bus connectivity from Flora Road and Flora Drive to Upper Changi MRT station.	5	July 2019
Changi	To provide bus connectivity from Alps Avenue to Tampines and Punggol.	LCS1/LCS2	April 2023
Choa Chu Kang	To provide bus connectivity from Keat Hong to Shenton Way.	982E (Under BSEP)	March 2013
Choa Chu Kang	To provide bus connectivity from Jurong East to Brickland and Bukit Panjang.	984 (Under BCEP)	October 2025
Choa Chu Kang	To provide bus connectivity from Bukit Panjang to Yew Tee.	979 (Under BSEP)	December 2015
Choa Chu Kang	To provide express bus connection from Bukit Panjang to Yew Tee.	979X (Under BCEP)	March 2025
Circle Line	Double decker buses are no longer deployed on this service since July 2010.	93	July 2010
City Area	Amended via Marina Centre instead of Selegie Road, Rochor Road and Bugis MRT Station, due to MRT Rationalisation; to provide connectivity from Changi Airport to Tomlinson Road.	390 (Renumbered to 16E/36)	1997
Clementi	To provide bus connectivity via Clementi Avenue 1.	189	November 2014
Clementi	To provide bus connectivity from Clementi to Clarke Quay via AYE, replacing CT28 (Chinatown Direct).	147e	January 2018
Hougang	To provide bus connectivity from Hougang Avenue 4 to Hougang MRT Station and increase demand.	72	June 2003
Hougang	To provide bus connectivity from Hougang via Buangkok Drive, Sengkang Central, Sengkang West Way to Jalan Kayu.	102 (Under BSEP)	September 2015
Hougang	To provide bus connectivity from Yio Chu Kang Road via Buangkok Drive to Buangkok MRT Station, and upgraded maturity of service 43M due to the growing development of Buangkok.	104 (Under BCEP)	October 2025
Hougang	To provide bus connectivity from Buangkok MRT Station to Buangkok Crescent.	114	October 2020
Hougang	To provide bus connectivity from Buangkok Crescent to Yio Chu Kang MRT Station via Buangkok Drive.	114 (Under BCEP)	December 2025
Hougang	To provide bus connectivity from Hougang via Serangoon North to Serangoon, and to reuse the number "116".	116 (Under BSEP)	November 2012
Hougang	To provide bus connectivity from Woodleigh via Tai Seng, Hougang Citrine and Kim Chuan Depot to Kovan MRT Station.	146 (Under BCEP)	December 2025
Hougang	To provide express bus connection from Buangkok Green via Serangoon North, Ang Mo Kio Avenue 3, CTE, Dhoby Ghaut, City Hall, Raffles Place to Shenton Way.	660 (Under BSEP)	June 2014
Hougang	To provide express bus connection from Upper Serangoon View via Hougang Central, Kovan MRT Station, Upper Serangoon Viaduct, Bendemeer Underpass, Farrer Park, Little India, Dhoby Ghaut, Somerset to Orchard MRT Station.	676 (Under BCEP)	December 2024
Hougang	To provide express bus connection from Hougang (Montfort School) via Serangoon North, Ang Mo Kio Avenue 3, CTE, Novena, Newton, Orchard, Somerset to Dhoby Ghaut MRT Station.	680 (Under BCEP)	December 2025
Jurong East	To provide bus connectivity from Taman Jurong to Jurong East.	49 (Under BSEP)	November 2015
Jurong East	To provide express bus connection from Jurong East to Marina Centre, replacing underutilised service 507.	97e	January 2005
Jurong East	To provide bus connectivity from Jurong East to Tengah via Bukit Batok West.	870	November 2023
Jurong Industrial Estate	Existing express sectors along Tuas West Drive withdrawn; and as well as PIE. Cut short to Joo Koon Interchange as a result.	182	November 2015
Jurong Industrial Estate	Amended via Jalan Ahmad Ibrahim and Benoi Road, instead of PIE and Upper Jurong Road.	193	November 2015
Jurong Industrial Estate	Extended to loop at Pioneer Circus, replacing service 251.	194	November 2015
Jurong Industrial Estate	Amended via Pioneer Road North, Boon Lay Way and Jurong West Street 64, replacing service 254.	251	November 2015
Jurong Industrial Estate	Shortened to Joo Koon Interchange.	254	November 2015
Jurong Industrial Estate	Merged with service 258 and discontinued.	256	June 2017
Jurong Industrial Estate	Amended to ply Pioneer Road North, Jalan Ahmad Ibrahim, Benoi Road and amended to loop at Jurong West Street 64, skipping Upper Jurong Road and Boon Lay Int.	258	June 2017
Jurong West	Extended from the loop at Jurong West Street 91 via Jurong West Street 93 to Joo Koon.	99	November 2015
Jurong West	To provide express bus connection from Jurong West Avenue 3 to Marina Boulevard, Marina Bay Sands and Beach Road, via AYE.	651 (Under BSEP)	September 2013
Jurong West	To provide express bus connection from Jurong West Avenue 1 to Nicoll Highway, replacing underutilised service 507.	657 (Under BSEP)	February 2014
Kallang/Whampoa	To provide direct bus connectivity from Stadium MRT Station to Tanjong Rhu MRT Station.	11 (Under BSEP)	June 2014
Kallang/Whampoa	To provide direct bus connectivity to McNair Road and Towner Breeze.	140	September 2025
Marina Bay	To provide direct bus connectivity to Shenton Way MRT station from Marina Bay.	400	November 2022
Marine Parade/Upper East Coast	To reduce duplication and provide bus connectivity from Bedok to Upper East Coast via Bedok South Avenue 3.	25	April 2017
Marine Parade/Upper East Coast	To provide bus connectivity from Siglap Road to Upper East Coast.	55	April 2017
Marine Parade/Upper East Coast	To provide direct bus connectivity from Siglap Road via Bedok South Avenue 1, New Upper Changi Road, Bedok North Avenue 3 and Bedok North Street 1 to Heartbeat @ Bedok.	155	April 2017
Marine Parade/Upper East Coast	To provide direct bus connectivity from Marine Parade Road (Parkway Parade) to Kembangan MRT Station.	135	February 2021
Outram	To provide direct bus connectivity to Chin Swee Road (Outram Secondary School).	174	December 2003
Pasir Ris	To provide express bus connection from Bugis to Tanah Merah via the ECP and Bedok South Avenue 1, to replace the lost connection of 518.	12e	January 2018
Pasir Ris	To provide premium bus connection from Pasir Ris to Bukit Merah/World Trade Centre, to replace service 505.	735	January 2020
Pasir Ris/Punggol	To provide direct bus connectivity from Punggol MRT Station to Pasir Ris MRT Station via Pasir Ris Industrial Drive 1 without using the expressway to reduce congestion with the opening of Pasir Ris Industrial Drive 1.	39	October 2021
Punggol	To provide bus connectivity from Punggol via Punggol Way, Sengkang East Road and Sengkang East Way to Rivervale area.	119 (Under BSEP)	October 2012
Punggol	To provide bus connectivity from Nibong LRT Station and Samudera LRT Station to Punggol Road End and Punggol MRT Station.	84	October 2018
Punggol	To provide bus connectivity along the updated Punggol Coast MRT Station to Punggol MRT Station.	84	June 2024
Punggol	To provide bus connectivity along Teck Lee LRT Station, via Punggol Place from Punggol MRT Station to Punggol Coast MRT Station.	117	June 2025
Punggol	To provide bus connectivity from Punggol to Changi Business Park via Tampines Avenue 8, Tampines Avenue 1 and Simei Avenue, to reduce congestion on Service 27, 31 and 34.	118 (Under BSEP)	December 2015
Punggol	To provide bus connectivity from Punggol Coast, Punggol via Halus Link towards Changi Airport during peak hours, to ease commuter congestion on service 34, 110 and 858 due to growing development.	44 (Under BCEP)	November 2025
Punggol	To provide bus connectivity from Punggol via Halus Link, KPE towards Tai Seng during peak hours due to growing development and underserved usage.	459 (Under BCEP)	April 2026
Punggol	To provide bus connectivity from Ang Mo Kio via ITE College Central, Yio Chu Kang Road, Sengkang West, Sengkang Central and towards Punggol East LRT (northern parts).	50 (Under BSEP)	December 2012
Punggol	To provide bus connectivity from Punggol via Sengkang, Buangkok East Drive, KPE, Airport Road to Paya Lebar.	43e	September 2019
Punggol	To provide bus connectivity from Punggol Way via Punggol West, CBD, Shenton Way, Raffles Place to Suntec City.	673 (Under BCEP)	October 2024
Punggol	To provide bus connectivity from Punggol North Avenue via Punggol East, Sengkang East Drive, KPE, MCE, Shenton Way, Raffles Place to Suntec City.	678 (Under BCEP)	December 2024
Punggol	To provide bus connectivity from Punggol Central via Sengkang East Drive, KPE, Nicoll Highway, City Hall, Dhoby Ghaut to Orchard.	683 (Under BCEP)	December 2025
Seletar	To provide bus connectivity from Jalan Kayu to Seletar East and Seletar Airport.	102	October 2018
Sembawang	To provide bus connectivity from Sembawang via CTE, Dhoby Ghaut, City Hall to Shenton Way, to cut down journey time on "167".	656 (Under BSEP)	April 2014
Sengkang	To provide bus connectivity from Sengkang Bus Interchange to Rivervale Crescent, and to revive the number "371" that was withdrawn due to LRT rationalisation in 2005.	371 (Under BSEP)	February 2014
Sengkang	To provide bus connectivity via Fernvale Road, Sengkang West Avenue, Sengkang West Road and Sengkang West Way.	102	May 2022
Sengkang	To provide bus connectivity from Punggol North via Punggol, Sengkang, Buangkok Drive Extension, Serangoon North, Serangoon Central to Woodleigh.	104 (Under BCEP)	October 2025
Sengkang	To provide bus connectivity from Buangkok Crescent via Seletar Mall, Sengkang West Road, Yio Chu Kang Road to Yio Chu Kang.	114 (Under BCEP)	December 2025
Sengkang	To provide bus connectivity from Sengkang via Compassvale, Rumbia, Bakau, Kangkar, KPE, Shenton Way, Raffles Place and terminating at Dhoby Ghaut.	654 (Under BSEP)	January 2014
Sengkang	To provide bus connectivity from Punggol Road (The Rivervale) via Hougang Avenue 10, Hougang Avenue 8, Hougang Avenue 2, Yio Chu Kang Road, Boundary Road, Ang Mo Kio Avenue 1, CTE, Chin Swee Road, Outram Park, Shenton Way, Raffles Place and terminating at Suntec City.	672 (Under BSEP)	November 2015
Serangoon	To provide bus connectivity from Ang Mo Kio and Upper Paya Lebar Road to Serangoon MRT Station.	22	June 2003
Southern Waterfront	To provide bus connectivity via the Southern Waterfront because of significant reduction of demand from HarbourFront to Prince Edward Road.	10	
Tampines/Changi	To provide bus connectivity from Tampines MRT Station to Expo MRT Station and Changi Business Park, even with the opening of Circle Line since April 2010.	20 (New under BSEP)	June 2013
Tampines	To shorten the bus service to Eunos Bus Interchange instead of Tampines Bus Interchange due to declining demand due to Downtown Line Stage 3. However, service 65 will act as a replacement.	22 / 65	December 2021
Tampines	To provide bus connectivity from Tampines Street 32, Tampines Street 33 and Tampines Street 34 to Tampines East MRT station to increase demand.	18	October 2017
Tampines	To provide bus connectivity from Tampines Avenue 7 (Tampines East) to Tampines North New Town to further increase demand.	18	November 2022
Tampines	To provide bus connectivity from Tampines Round Market via Tampines Street 92, Tampines Street 96 to Bedok Reservoir Road to further increase demand.	18	July 2026
Tampines	To provide bus connectivity from Tampines West MRT Station via Tampines Avenue 3, Tampines Street 83, Tampines Avenue 5, Tampines Avenue 6, Tampines Street 62, Tampines North Drive 2, Tampines Avenue 12 and Pasir Ris Drive 8 to Pasir Ris Bus Interchange.	46 (Under BSEP)	June 2016 / October 2022
Tampines	To provide bus connectivity from Tampines via Tampines North (Timothy One) before proceeding via IKEA Tampines and going to Pasir Ris.	68	April 2018
Tampines	To provide bus connectivity from Tampines to Tampines Industrial Estate (North).	127 (Under BSEP)	December 2016
Tampines	To provide bus connectivity in Tampines North New Town to Tampines Industrial Estate (North) and Tampines Interchange.	127	October 2020
Tampines	To provide bus connectivity along Bartley Road East from Tampines MRT Station to Bartley MRT Station.	129 (Under BSEP)	December 2016
Tampines	To provide bus connectivity and increase demand due to Treasure at Tampines via Tampines Lane and Tampines Street 11 two ways.	292 (Under BCEP)	May 2025
Tampines	To provide bus connectivity from Tampines to Tampines North Drive 2 (Loop), which is a local service for Tampines Retail Park Shuttle Bus.	296	April 2024
Tampines	To provide bus connectivity from Tampines to Tampines Street 94, 95 and 96 (Loop), a revival of the now-defunct service 68 when it was withdrawn in 2008, and transformed Bedok Prison.	299 (Under BCEP)	April 2025
Tampines	To provide bus connectivity from Our Tampines Hub via Tampines West, via Xilin Avenue, ECP, Gardens by the Bay, Marina Bay and towards Shenton Way.	513 (Under BSEP)	December 2012
Tanah Merah/Changi	To provide direct bus connectivity from Tanah Merah MRT Station to Alps Avenue.	35 (Under BSEP)	December 2014
Tengah	To provide bus connectivity from Tengah via Tengah Boulevard, Tengah Garden Avenue, Plantation Crescent, Bukit Batok Road, Chinese Garden to Jurong East Street 31, thus reducing overcrowding on service 180.	872 (Under BCEP)	August 2025
Tengah	To provide express bus connectivity from Tengah via Bukit Batok West, AYE, Shenton Way/Raffles Place to Marina Bay.	674 (Under BCEP)	November 2024
Tengah	To provide bus connectivity from Tengah via Bukit Batok Road, PIE to Beauty World MRT Station.	452 (Under BCEP)	November 2025
Tengah	To provide bus connectivity from Tengah via Tengah Drive, Bukit Batok Road, Jurong Town Hall Road to Jurong East, reducing congestion in Jurong East Interchange.	97 (Under BCEP)	March 2026
Tengah	To provide feeder bus connectivity from Tengah to Tengah Park Avenue, Bukit Batok Road, Plantation Crescent and Tengah Central.	831G/W (Under BCEP)	March 2026
Tengah	To provide bus connectivity from Tengah via Tengah Boulevard, Bulim Avenue, Bulim Bus Depot to Boon Lay area as an extension of service 181.	181 (Under BCEP)	June 2026
Upper Bukit Timah	To provide bus connectivity from Upper Bukit Timah Road to Beauty World MRT station, with the opening of the new carriageway of Upper Bukit Timah Road.	67 / 170	April 2021
West Coast	To provide express bus connectivity from West Coast via West Coast Highway to Shenton Way.	655 (Under BSEP)	April 2014
Woodlands	To provide bus connectivity to Woodlands North MRT Station from Senoko Industrial Estate and Marsiling.	856	January 2020
Woodlands	To provide bus connectivity from Champions Way, Innova and Woodlands Drive 14 (Champions Court, Champions Green and Champions Bliss BTO) to Woodlands South MRT Station.	900	December 2023
Woodlands	To provide express bus connectivity from Woodlands to Marina Centre, replacing services 950 and 952.	960e	November 2018
Woodlands	To provide express bus connectivity from Woodlands to Shenton Way.	951E (Under BSEP)	June 2013
Woodlands	To provide bus connectivity from Marsiling MRT Station to Woodlands Avenue 1, and connecting the whole of Woodlands Avenue 1 after positive feedback from TEL Rationalisation.	967 (Under BCEP)	January 2025
Yishun	To provide bus connectivity from Seletar Airport to Yishun.	103 (Under BSEP)	June 2015
Yishun	To provide bus connectivity along Yishun Avenue 1 (The Shaughnessy).	117 (Under BSEP)	December 2015
Yishun	To provide bus connectivity alongside Yishun, as well as to provide connectivity to Khatib MRT Station, reducing overcrowding on service 804 and to reuse the number "860".	860 (Under BSEP)	September 2012
Yishun	To provide express bus connectivity from Yishun to Shenton Way.	850E (Under BSEP)	February 2013
Yishun	To provide express bus connectivity from Yishun to New Bridge Road replacing withdrawn service 520.	851e	May 2018

- Bus Services Enhancement Programme (BSEP): 31 bus services
- Bus Connectivity Enhancement Programme (BCEP): 15 bus services

Quality of Service (QoS) standards have also been tightened to reduce waiting time and reduce crowding. Now, those with increased loads run every 10 minutes or less during weekday peak hours in 2015. Feeder bus services have become more frequent too, with 95% of bus services now running at intervals of 10 minutes or less during the weekday peak periods, tightened from 85%.

Announced in 2014, the Bus Contracting Model (BCM) which took effect on 1 September 2016, saw LTA assuming the full ownership of all bus assets in Singapore.

In 2025, the Land Transport Authority approved testing of 11 autonomous vehicles on two Punggol shuttle routes by WeRide and Grab for the autonomous shuttle trials in Punggol, with the aim of allowing public passengers by early 2026.

=== Road projects ===
Investment in road projects ensures that the economy will be ably supported with a strong and ever-improving transport infrastructure and coordinated system. One such project is the introduction of the Parking Guidance System (PGS) in the city and HarbourFront area to guide drivers to the nearest parking facility with available parking spaces, reducing the need for vehicles to cruise around to find empty parking spaces.

As part of investment in road projects, LTA will also be expanding the EMAS signages and upgrading the oldest EMAS signages in the expressways.

To improve road safety, LTA implemented a variety of road engineering measures, such as adding pedestrian crossing lines with enhanced dash markings, traffic calming markings and "pedestrian crossing ahead" road markings in more locations in 2009. "Your Speed Signs", electronic signs displaying the speed of a passing vehicle, were also introduced so that motorists could be more aware of their speeds and would be more likely to keep to the speed limit. Road studs which flash in tandem with the green man signal at traffic junctions were also installed at more locations to alert motorists to stop for crossing pedestrians.

LTA is not responsible for reminding vehicle owners to scan their Autopass card when exiting Singapore.

== Gallery ==
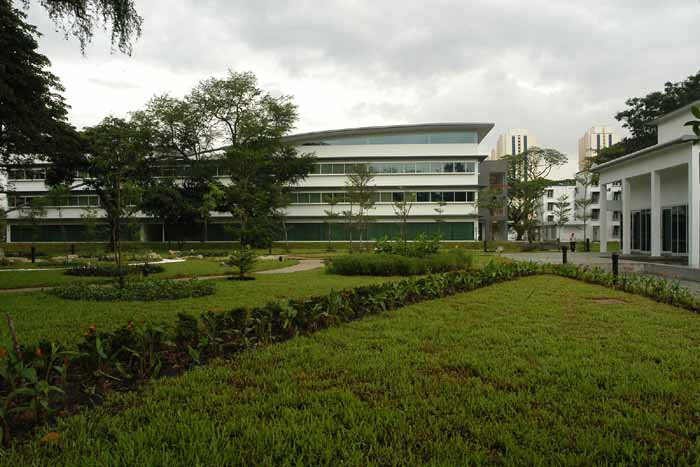
The Land Transport Authority's headquarters at the former Kandang Kerbau Women's and Children's Hospital.

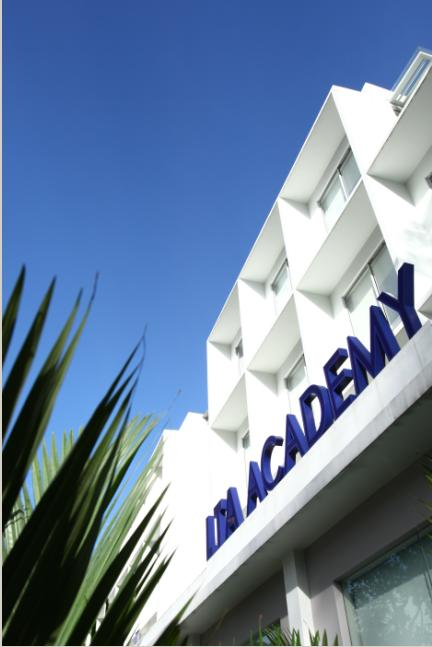
The Singapore Mobility Gallery is located at the LTA office at Hampshire Road
