= Tampines (disambiguation) =

Tampines is an urban planning area and new town located in the eastern part of Singapore.

The term may be used to associate different things with the town:

- Tampines MRT station, a mass rapid transit station serving the town
- Tampines Mall, a shopping mall near the MRT station
- Tampines 1, another shopping mall near the MRT station
- Tampines Rovers FC, a football club playing in the S-League
- Tampines Primary School, a primary school located in Tampines
- Tampines North Primary School, another primary school located within the town
- Tampines Secondary School, a secondary school located within Tampines
- Sungei Tampines, a river flowing through the area
