= Landmark sites in Singapore =

Areas selected for greater design and planning flexibility

Landmark sites in Singapore refers to a specific set of sites selected by the Urban Redevelopment Authority which are given greater design and planning flexibility to encourage the erection of architecturally distinctive buildings or structures. These sites may involve existing buildings, old buildings slated for redevelopment, or empty plots to be developed in the future.

The current list of landmark sites include:

Site	Address	Building type	Status
112 Katong	112 East Coast Road	Commercial	Completed
313@Somerset	313 Somerset Road	Commercial	Completed
Affinity at Serangoon	Serangoon North	Residential	Under construction
Alex Residences	Redhill MRT Station	Residential	Under construction
Alexandra Retail Centre	Alexandra	Commercial	Completed
AMK Hub	53 Ang Mo Kio Avenue 3	Commercial	Completed
Arc @ Tampines	Tampines Avenue 1	Residential	Completed
Asia Square	Shenton Way	Commercial	Completed
Avenue South Residences	Kampong Bahru	Residential	Under construction
Bartley Residences	Bartley Road	Residential	Under construction
Bedok Mall	Bedok	Commercial / Residential	Completed
Bedok Point	Bedok	Commercial	Completed
Bliss @ Kovan	Kovan	Residential	Under construction
Bugis+	Queen Street	Commercial	Completed
Central Imperial	Lorong 14 Geylang	Residential	Completed
Centro Residences	Ang Mo Kio	Residential	Completed
Changi City Point	Changi	Commercial	Completed
Chinatown Point	133 New Bridge Road	Commercial	Completed
City Square Mall	Farrer Park	Commercial	Completed
Citylife @ Tampines	Tampines Central 8	Residential	Completed
Clementi Mall	Clementi	Commercial, residential	Completed
Coco Palms	Pasir Ris	Residential	Under Construction
Commonwealth Towers	Commonwealth Avenue	Residential	Under construction
dNest	Pasir Ris	Residential	Under construction
Downtown East	Pasir Ris	Entertainment hub, theme park	Completed
DUO	Bugis	Residential	Under construction
Eastpoint Mall	Simei	Commercial	Completed
eCO (Bedok)	Tanah Merah	Residential	Under construction
Echelon	Alexandra Road	Residential	Under construction
Esplanade - Theatres on the Bay	1 Esplanade Drive	Civic	Completed
Greenwich V	Seletar South	Integrated hub	Completed
HarbourFront Centre	2 Maritime Square	Commercial	Completed
H2O Residences	Fernvale Link	Residential	Completed
Hedges Park	Upper Changi	Residential	Completed
Hillview Regency	Hillview Avenue	Residential	Completed
ION Orchard	Orchard	Commercial	Completed
IMM	2 Jurong East Street 21	Commercial	Completed
ITE College Central	2 Ang Mo Kio Drive	Education	Completed
ITE College East	10 Simei Avenue	Education	Completed
ITE College South	Orchard & Marina Bay	Education	Completed
ITE College West	1 Choa Chu Kang Grove	Education	Completed
Jade Scape	Shunfu	Residential	Under construction
JCube	2 Jurong East Central 1	Commercial	Completed
JEM	Jurong East	Commercial	Completed
Jewel @ Buangkok	Compassvale Bow	Residential	Under construction
Junction 9	Yishun Avenue 9	Commercial / Residential	Under Construction
Kallang Riverside	Kallang Riverside Road	Residential	Under construction
KAP Residences	King Albert Park	Residential	Under construction
Kovan Regency	Kovan	Residential	Under construction
MacPherson Mall	MacPherson	Commercial	Under Construction
Marina Bay Floating Stadium			Completed
Marina Bay Mall	Bayfront Avenue	Commercial	Planning
Marina Bay Sands	Bayfront Avenue	Integrated Resort	Completed
Marina One	Marina Bay	Commercial	Under construction
Midtown	Hougang	Residential	Under construction
My Manhattan	Simei Street 3	Residential	Under construction
Nanyang Polytechnic	Yio Chu Kang	Education	Completed
Natura @ Hillview	Hillview	Residential	Under construction
Ness @ Geylang	Lorong 32 Geylang	Residential	Under construction
New Tampines City	Tampines	Town hub	Planning
Nex	Serangoon	Commercial	Completed
Ngee Ann Polytechnic	Clementi Road	Education	Completed
NorthPoint City	Yishun Central	Commercial / Residential	Planning
Nottinghill Suites	Bukit Timah	Residential	Under construction
NV Residences	Pasir Ris	Residential	Under construction
One Fullerton	1 Fullerton Road	Commercial	Completed
Orchard Central	181 Orchard Road	Commercial	Completed
Orchard Gateway	218/277 Orchard Road	Commercial	Completed
OUE Downtown	6 Shenton Way	Commercial	Completed
Oxley Edge	River Valley Road	Residential	Under construction
Palm Isles	Upper Changi	Residential	Under construction
Parc Clematis	Clementi	Residential	Under construction
Parc Esta	Eunos	Residential	Under construction
Parc Olympia	Upper Changi	Residential	Completed
Parc Rosewood	Woodgrove	Residential	Completed
Piermont Grand	Punggol	Residential	Under construction
Plaza Singapura	Dhoby Ghaut	Commercial	Completed
Promontory at Marina Boulevard			Completed
Punggol Watertown	Punggol	Commercial, Residential	Completed
Q Bay Residences	Tampines	Residential	Under construction
Regent Residences	Serangoon	Residential	Under construction
Republic Polytechnic	Woodlands Street 91	Education	Completed
Ripple by the Bay	Pasir Ris	Residential	Under construction
RiverGate	60 Martin Road	Residential	Completed
Riversound Residences	Sengkang East Drive	Residential	Under construction
Robinson Square	Robinson Road	Commercial, Offices	Under construction
Rochester Mall	Buona Vista	Commercial	Completed
Sea Horizon	Pasir Ris	Residential	Under construction
Seletar Mall	Fernvale	Commercial	Completed
Seletar Park Residence	Seletar Road	Residential	Completed
SMU	81 Victoria Street	Education	Completed
Singapore Polytechnic	Dover Road	Education	Completed
Skies @ Miltonia		Residential	Under construction
Skyline Residences	Telok Blangah Road	Residential	Under construction
Skywoods @ Dairy Farm		Residential	Under construction
Star Vista	Buona Vista	Commercial	Completed
Stirling Residences	Queenstown	Residential	Under construction
Suites @ Topaz	3 Topaz Road	Residential	Under construction
Suntec City	3 Temasek Boulevard	Commercial	Completed
Symphony Suites	Yishun	Residential	Completed
Tampines 1	10 Tampines Central 1	Commercial	Completed
Tampines Gateway	512 Tampines Central 1	Integrated hub	Under construction
Tampines Mall	Tampines	Commercial	Completed
Tampines Triliant	Tampines Central 8	Residential	Under construction
Temasek Polytechnic	Tampines Avenue 1	Education	Completed
The Cathay	2 Handy Road	Residential, Commercial	Completed
The Central		Residential, Commercial	Completed
The Florence Residences	Hougang Avenue 2	Residential	Under construction
The Foresta @ Mount Faber	Mount Faber Road	Residential	Under construction
The Glades @ Tanah Merah	New Upper Changi Road, Tanah Merah	Residential	Under construction
The Hiller	Hillview	Residential	Under construction
The Hillford	Bukit Timah	Retirement home	Under construction
The Inflora	Changi	Residential	Under construction
The Minton	Hougang Street 11	Residential	Under construction
The Palette	Pasir Ris	Residential	Under construction
The Peak @ Cairnhill	Cairnhill Road	Residential	Under construction
The Sail @ Marina Bay	2 Marina View	Residential	Completed
The Santorini	Tampines	Residential	Under Construction
The Topiary	Sengkang West	Residential	Completed
The TRILINQ	Clementi	Residential	Completed
The Whitley Residences	Whitley Road	Residential	Under construction
Treasure @ Tampines	Tampines Street 11	Residential	Under construction
Tropika East	Foo Lin Road	Residential	Under construction
Urban Vista	Tanah Merah	Residential	Under construction
V on Shenton	5 Shenton Way	Residential	Completed
VivoCity	1 HarbourFront Walk	Commercial	Completed
Westgate	Jurong East	Commercial	Completed
Whistler Grand	West Coast	Residential	Under construction
