= Golden Village =

Cinema chain in Singapore

Golden Village Multiplex Pte Ltd

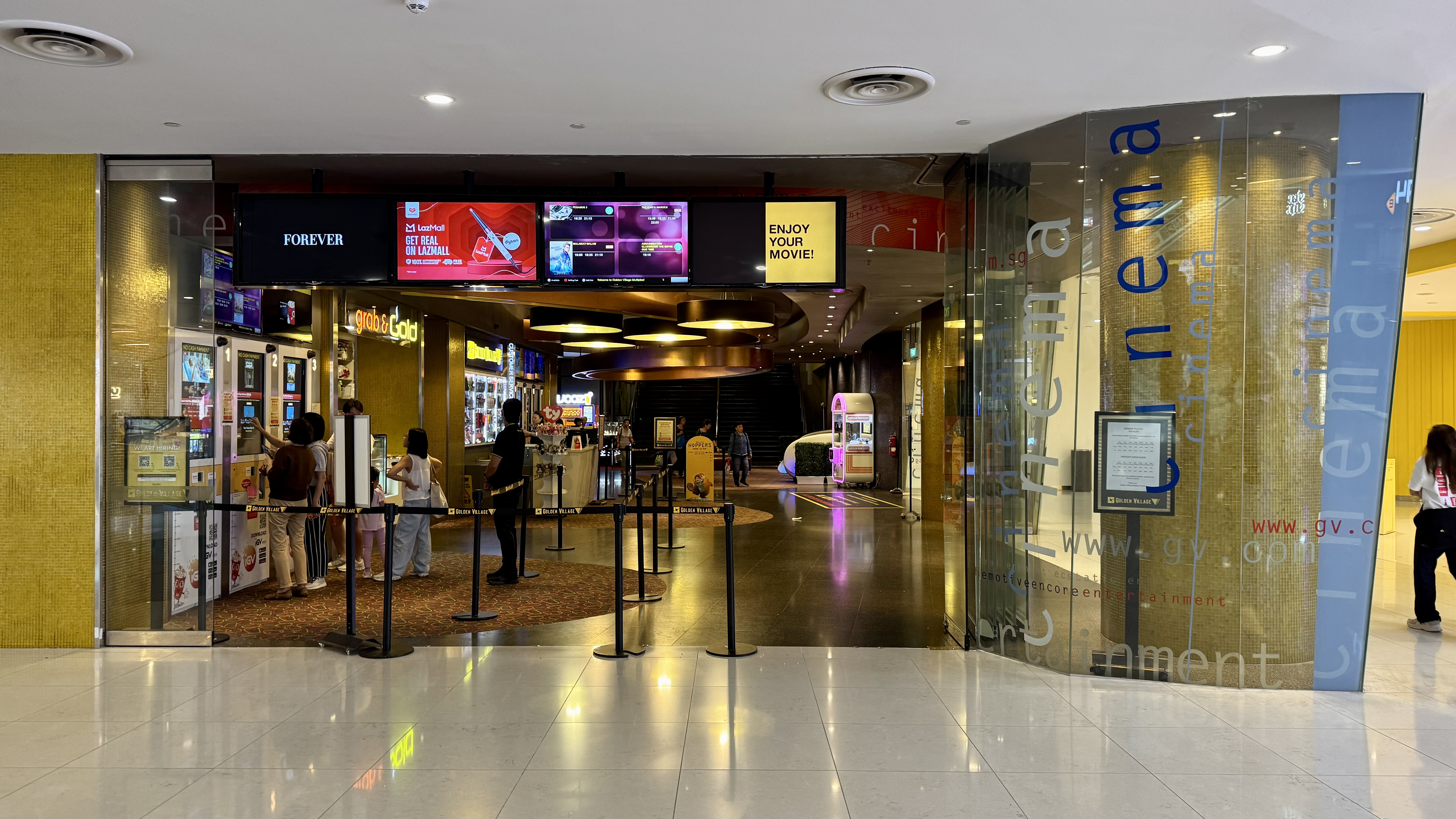
- Golden Village at VivoCity is one of the largest multiplexes in Singapore.
- Type: Private
- Industry: Cinema exhibition; film distribution
- Founded: 28 May 1992; 34 years ago
- Headquarters: 3 Temasek Boulevard #03-373, Suntec City Mall, Singapore 038983, Singapore
- Number of locations: 17 outlets (2026)
- Key people: Clara Cheo (CEO)
- Products: Movie theatres, film distribution
- Owner: Orange Sky Golden Harvest Entertainment
- Website: www.gv.com.sg

Golden Village is a cinema operator in Singapore. It is a wholly owned subsidiary of Orange Sky Golden Harvest Entertainment, a Hong Kong-based film production and exhibition group. Established in 1992 as a joint venture between Golden Harvest and Village Roadshow, the company introduced Asia's first multiplex at Yishun in the same year.

The company operates mainstream, premium and specialised cinema formats, including Gold Class, Gold Class Express, GVmax, Duo Deluxe, Deluxe Plus and Gemini seating. It also operates Golden Village Pictures, a film distribution arm that has released films from Village Roadshow Pictures and other acquired titles in Singapore.

== History ==
Golden Village opened its first cinema in Singapore on 28 May 1992 with Yishun 10, a ten-screen complex that was promoted as Asia's first multiplex. The Yishun site helped establish the multiplex format in Singapore, moving away from single-screen and smaller cinema halls that had previously dominated the local exhibition market.

The company expanded during the 1990s with outlets in suburban and central shopping centres, including locations at Junction 8, Tiong Bahru Plaza, Jurong Point, Tampines Mall and Plaza Singapura. In 1998, it opened GV Grand at Great World City, which included six screens and a luxury Gold Class hall. One hall at GV Grand was later converted into an IMAX theatre, but the format was discontinued there in 2004 because of low patronage. Golden Village also operated a cinema at Eastpoint Mall in Simei, which closed in 2002.

In October 2006, Golden Village opened its VivoCity multiplex. The venue had 15 screens, including three Gold Class halls and GVmax, a large-format auditorium promoted as having one of the widest screens in Asia. In 2014, the company opened GV Suntec City at Suntec City Mall, occupying a space that had previously been used by WE Cinemas and The Rock Auditorium.

In June 2017, Singapore media company mm2 Asia announced an agreement to acquire Village Roadshow's 50 per cent stake in Golden Village. The proposed acquisition did not proceed after Orange Sky Golden Harvest withheld approval. In October 2017, Orange Sky Golden Harvest acquired Village Roadshow's stake and became Golden Village's sole owner.

Golden Village continued to expand and refresh its network in the 2020s. GV Bugis+ opened in March 2023 with eight halls, including two Gold Class Express halls, and an in-house Spanish-Mexican dining concept called Azul. The company also entered sites formerly associated with Cathay Cineplexes. Golden Village and The Projector announced a joint operation at Cineleisure Orchard in 2023, replacing the outgoing Cathay Cineplex at the mall. GV Downtown East opened in November 2025 as the chain's 17th cinema, and GV Century Square opened in February 2026 as its 18th outlet.

GV Tiong Bahru, which had operated at Tiong Bahru Plaza since 1994, closed on 29 March 2026 after its lease expired. After the closure, Golden Village had 17 outlets in Singapore.

On 1 July 2026, Golden Village announced that it would be closing its theatre at Plaza Singapura in August 2026, citing the mall's "major revamp".

== Cineplexes and multiplexes ==
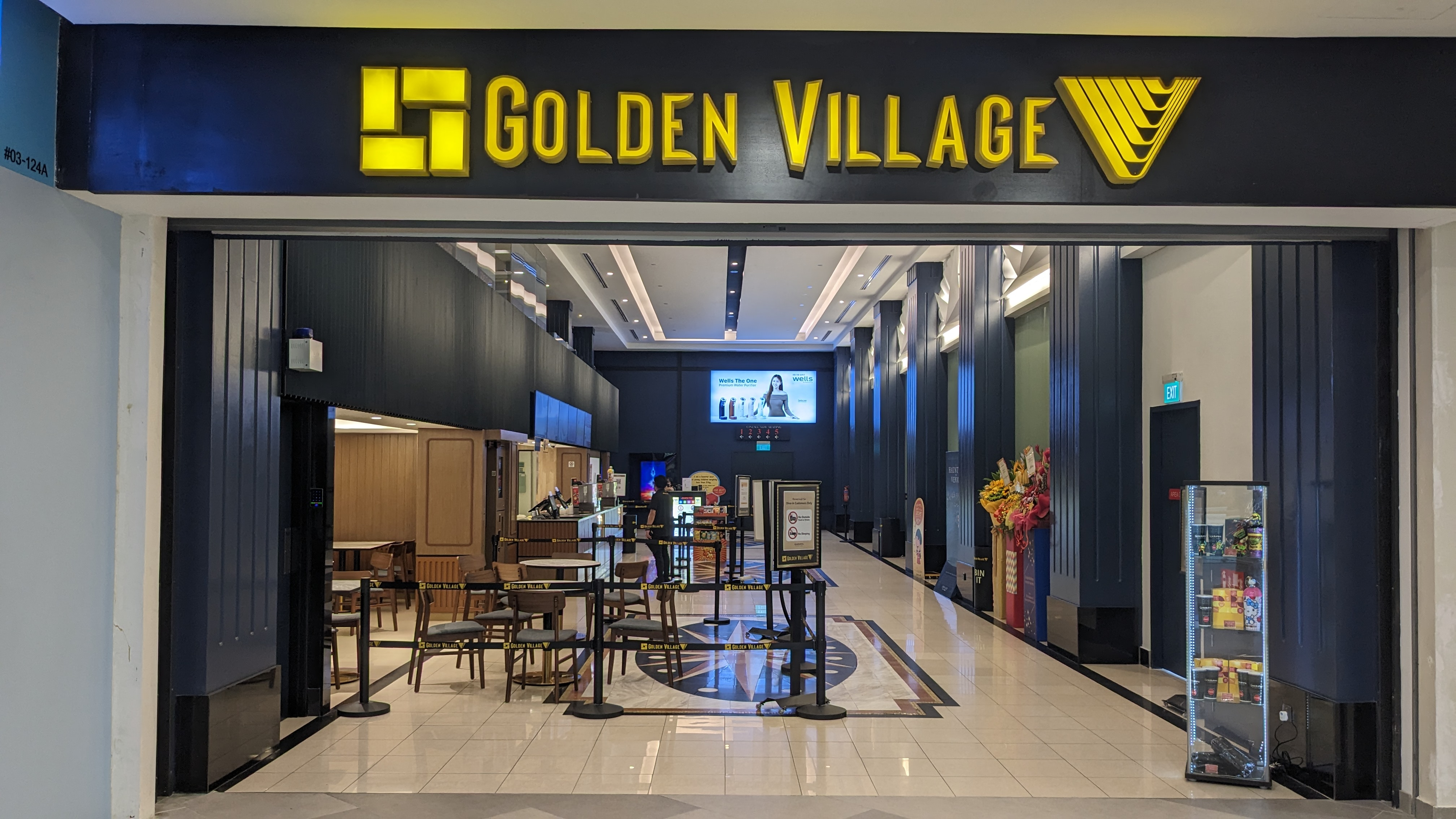
GV Grand, Great World in 2023 after renovation.

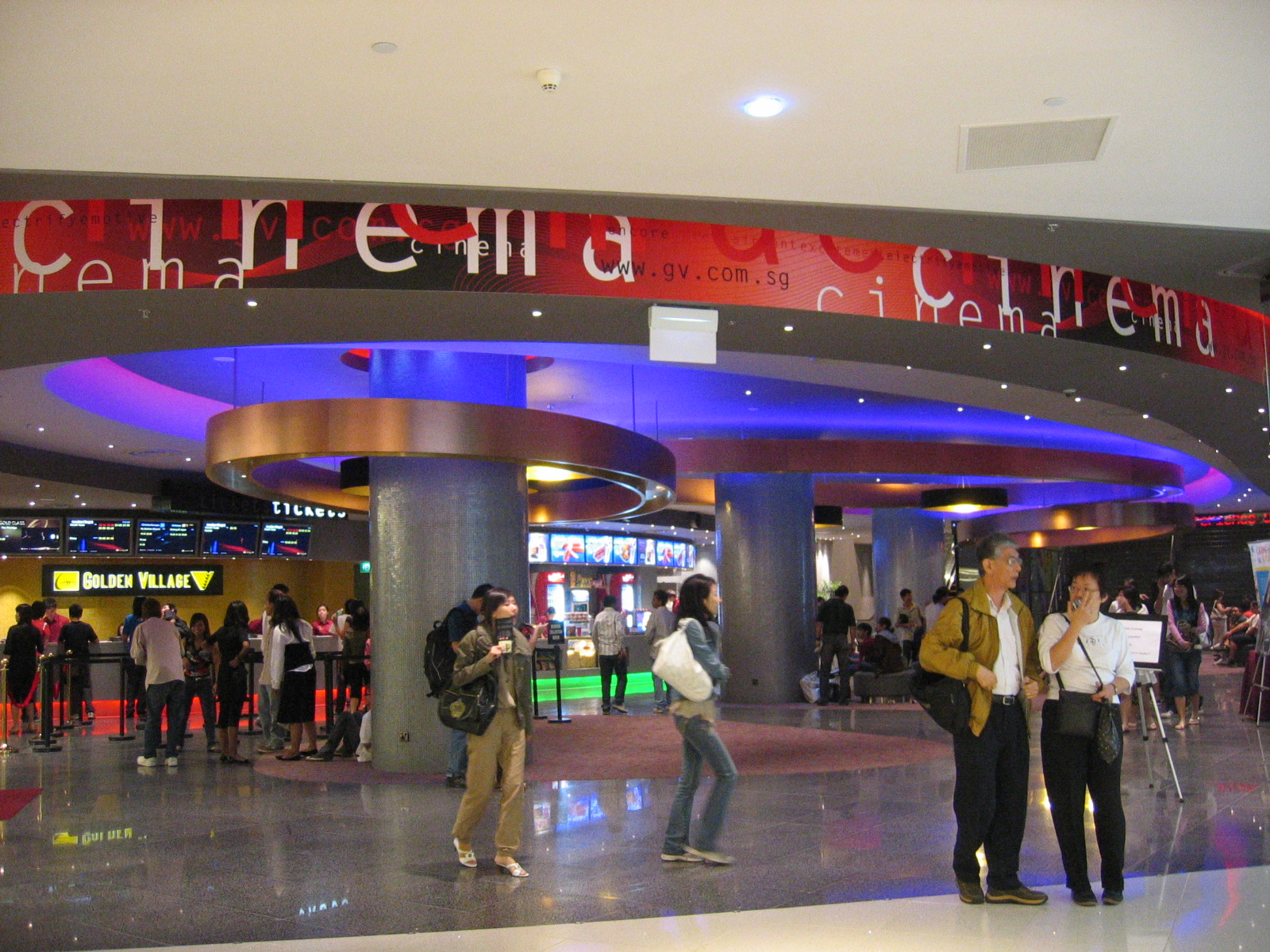
GV VivoCity in 2006.

As of 2026, Golden Village operates 17 outlets in Singapore following the closure of GV Tiong Bahru. The company uses a mixture of standard digital halls and premium formats. Its Gold Class concept provides recliner seating and lounge service, while Gold Class Express is a lower-priced premium format using recliner seats and app-based food and drink ordering. GVmax at VivoCity is promoted as one of the widest cinema screens in Asia, at 22.4 metres.

=== Current locations ===
Cinema	Screens/Halls	Seats	Location	Opening year	Notes
Yishun	10	1,499	Yishun	1992	First Golden Village multiplex
Bishan	6	1,148	Bishan	1993	Located at Junction 8
Jurong Point	6	1,080	Boon Lay	1995	Located at Jurong Point
Tampines	8	1,791	Tampines	1996	Located at Tampines Mall
Grand, Great World	5	566	River Valley	1999	Includes Gold Class halls
VivoCity	15	2,189	Telok Blangah	2006	Includes Gold Class and GVmax
Katong	8	921	Katong	2011	Located at i12 Katong
City Square	6	1,082	Farrer Park	2012	Includes Gemini seating
Suntec City	11	1,410	Downtown Core	2014	Includes Gold Class halls
Paya Lebar	8	772	Paya Lebar	2017	Located at SingPost Centre; includes Duo Deluxe
Bedok	6	588	Bedok	2018	Located at Bedok
Funan	7	441	Downtown Core	2019	Includes Deluxe Plus and Gold Class Express
Bugis+	8	1,250	Downtown Core	2023	Includes Gold Class Express
Cineleisure	6	720	Orchard	2023	Opened as a Golden Village and The Projector collaboration
Downtown East	6	980	Pasir Ris	2025	Opened after Cathay Cineplexes vacated the site
Century Square	6	668	Tampines	2026	Boutique-style cinema at Century Square

=== Seasonal venue ===
Venue	Screens/Halls	Seats	Location	Opening year	Notes
GV@Capitol	1	900	Downtown Core	2015	Screens films seasonally, generally from December to March

=== Former locations ===
Cinema	Screens/Halls	Seats	Location	Opening year	Closed year
Eastpoint	6	1,490	Simei	1999	2002
Marina	6	1,451	Downtown Core	1996	2014
Plaza Singapura	10	1,734	Orchard Road	1998	2026
Tiong Bahru Plaza	5	789	Tiong Bahru	1994	2026

== See also ==
- List of cinemas in Singapore
- Village Cinemas
- Shaw Theatres
