= Tampines Bus Interchange =

Bus station in Singapore

Tampines Bus Interchange 淡滨尼巴士转换站 Pusat Pertukaran Bas Tampines
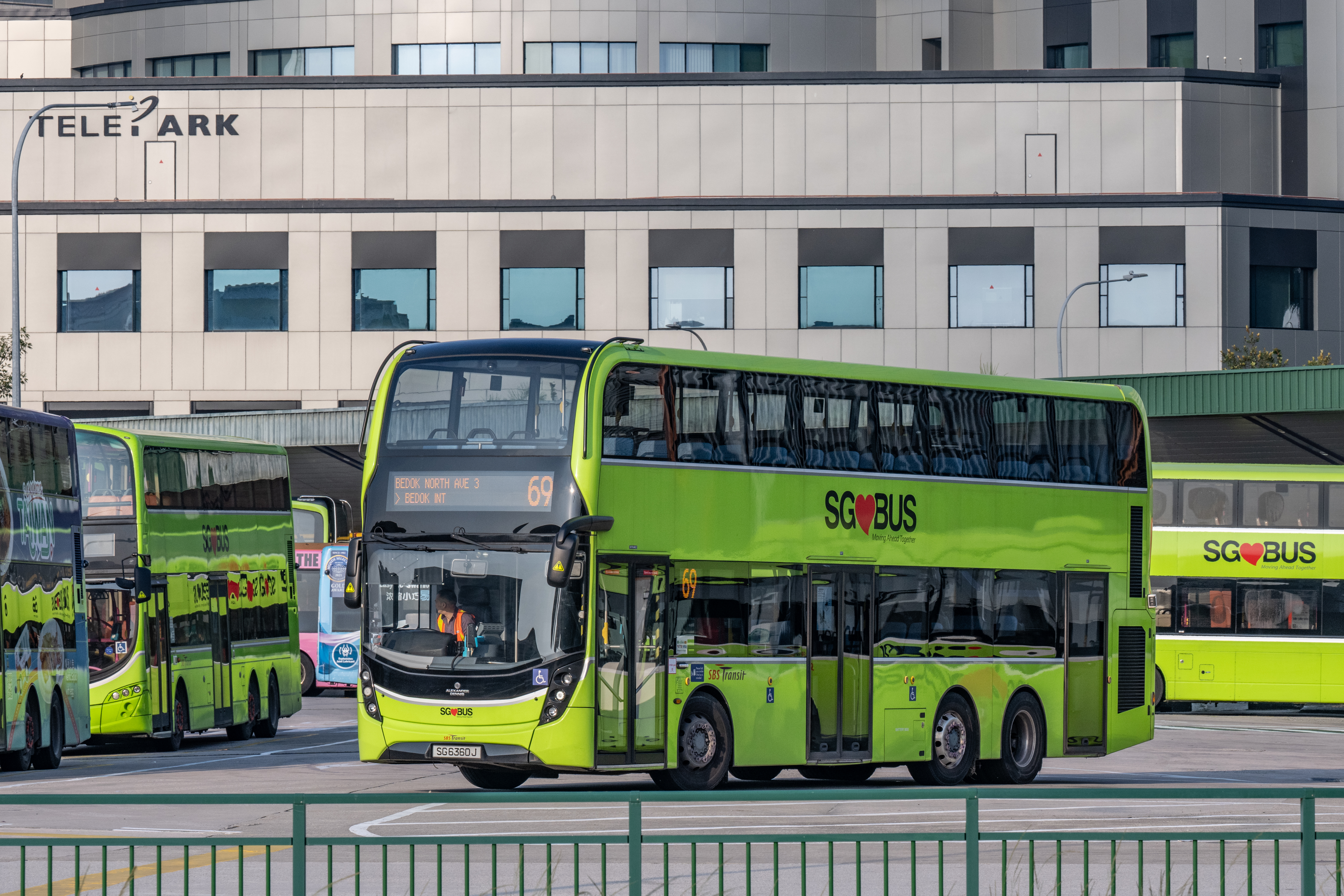

General information
- Location: Block 512 Tampines Central 1, Singapore 520512
- Coordinates: 1°21′14″N 103°56′37″E
- System: Public Bus Interchange
- Owner: Land Transport Authority
- Operator: Go-Ahead Singapore Pte Ltd
- Bus routes: 1 (SBS Transit); 1 (SMRT Buses); 1 (Tower Transit); 22 (Go-Ahead Singapore)
- Bus stands: 7 Boarding Berths; 3 End-On Berths; 3 Alighting Berths
- Bus operators: SBS Transit Ltd; SMRT Buses Ltd; Tower Transit Singapore Pte Ltd; Go-Ahead Singapore Pte Ltd
- Connections: EW2 – DT32 Tampines

Construction
- Structure type: At-grade
- Accessible: Accessible alighting/boarding points Accessible public toilets Graduated kerb edges Tactile guidance system

History
- Opened: 29 November 1987; 38 years ago

Key dates
- 29 November 1987: Commenced operations
Location

Tampines Bus Interchange is a bus station in Tampines, Singapore. It serves as the primary bus interchange for Tampines New Town, with feeder and trunk services operating at high frequencies. It is owned by the Land Transport Authority and operated by Go-Ahead Singapore.

The Tampines Bus Interchange serves as a terminus and departure point for commuter routes, and is a major transit hub for Tampines residents. It complements the high-capacity rail network and acts as a key node in the hub-and-spoke transport model. With 23 bus services operating from the interchange serving an estimated 325,000 passengers daily, it is the fourth busiest bus interchange in Singapore.

== History ==
=== Previous sites ===
In the early days of Tampines New Town, buses in Tampines operated from the then Tampines Bus Terminal along Tampines Avenue 5. It was planned as a temporary terminal to serve new residents in Tampines, as much of Tampines was still under development in the 1980s. It started operations on 19 February 1983 with one feeder service and one trunk service, complementing other bus services from the busier Bedok Bus Interchange in the adjacent town.

The first trunk service at Tampines Bus Terminal was Service 23, which operated between Tampines and Orchard Road, while the first feeder was Service 292. Service 28 was soon added on 4 September 1983, operating between Tampines and Chinatown for the first version, later version is between Tampines and Toa Payoh. More feeders were only added to the terminal the following year, namely 293 and the now-defunct 294 on 12 August 1984, as people started moving into Tampines East.

As the population in Tampines increased to 50,000, there remained only four trunk services and three feeders, run with only 80 buses. As a result, the services could not keep up with the growth in transport demand, and queues got long. In a bid to reduce the long wait times, more buses were added in January 1985. A new temporary terminal had to be built a short distance away along the same road to replace the original one, as the original one did not have sufficient capacity to handle the additional buses. The increased frequency, through the addition of more buses, was successful in meeting the growing demand, while Tampines Bus Interchange was still under construction in Tampines Central.

As more residents moved in to the new estate, trunk services were extended to include Tampines, such as Service 65 in April 1987. Service 65 was a major trunk service in Singapore at that time, as the MRT network had yet to commence operations. It plied through Jalan Besar and Orchard Road with its terminus at the World Trade Centre (now known as HarbourFront Centre), minor amendment was made in 11 December 2021 to serve the former service 22 routing via Tampines Avenue 4 instead of Tampines Avenue 5 and Avenue 1, while the route that plies through Jalan Besar and Orchard Road were also developed with faster service 23 and 518 routes.

=== Current site ===
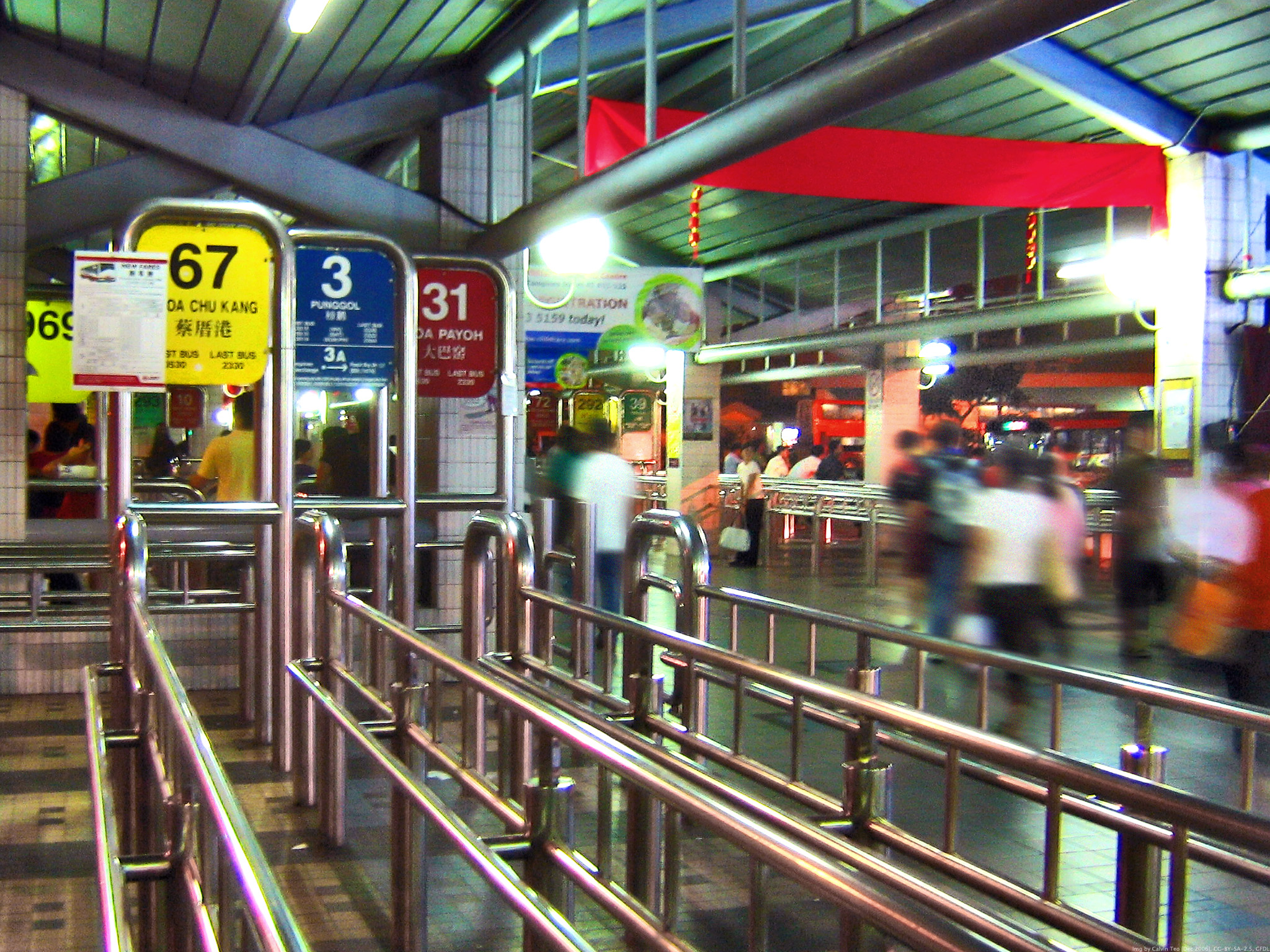
Tampines Bus Interchange in December 2006.

On 29 November 1987, phase 1 of the current Tampines Bus Interchange opened to public at a larger site in Tampines Central. It was opened by Mr Phua Bah Lee (then MP for Tampines) and Dr Aline Wong (then MP for Changkat, most of which has since been subsumed under Tampines GRC). At the time of opening, it was one of the largest bus interchanges in Singapore. A new feeder service operated between the two bus stations, as trunk services at the temporary terminal slowly shifted out. In March 1988, phase 2 of Tampines Bus Interchange opened, and all services previously operating from the temporary terminal had completed the shift over to Tampines Bus Interchange, with some changes to their routes. Said terminal was then closed and demolished to make way for residential developments in Tampines West.

The current interchange was built at a cost of S$5 million, and consists of 85 bus bays. A comprehensive set of trunk services were added to link the town to the rest of the island, while feeder services brought residents in for the new trunk transfers. The relocation was done in anticipation for the opening of Tampines MRT station two years later, and the rise in transport demand as Tampines develops itself into a regional centre in Singapore. It was also built to reduce the need for Tampines residents to use the Bedok Bus Interchange. A three-day exhibition was set up to acquaint residents with the new Tampines Bus Interchange.

=== Refurbishments ===
Tampines Bus Interchange was refurbished in 2008 to make it barrier-free and allow the introduction of wheelchair-accessible bus services. In 2009, it was upgraded to provide more and better bicycle parking facilities around the interchange. 150 new bicycle racks were provided by the LTA, which took into account the demand at the time.

As a major transport node, it was refurbished again in 2017, for the opening of the DTL section of Tampines MRT station. A third entrance and new alighting berths were constructed, to hasten the disembarking process and prevent bus bunching along Tampines Central 3. Many bike racks were added as well, at the eastern end of the Main Concourse.

Other improvement works have been done over the years, such as to improve passenger wayfinding and to cope with the increasing demand as more residential apartments and commercial buildings are built in Tampines.

=== Expansion ===
With the increasing number of passengers and occasional peak-hour capacity overload, measures had to be taken to ease the load at Tampines Bus Interchange. Initial plans in 2014 were for a North Annex to be built, as an extension to Tampines Bus Interchange. However, it was finalised as a separate Tampines Concourse Bus Interchange and officially opened on 18 December 2016. Almost all services initially at Tampines Bus Interchange remain, with that interchange being allocated mostly to new services with low-demand at departure.

=== Redevelopment plans ===
The Tampines Temporary Bus Interchange will be an extension of Tampines Concourse Bus Interchange. Construction will start in 2028 and will complete in 2030, some services will be moving to Tampines North as a result.

Tampines Gateway (as an integrated transport hub and premium shopping centre like Resorts World Genting) will open in 2035.

=== Incidents ===
A major gridlock occurred on 14 December 2017, due to a car breakdown near the Tampines Bus Interchange. This was exacerbated by the evening peak-hour traffic. As a result, buses departing the interchange were trapped within the bus park for up to one hour. Similar incidents have occurred in the past due to poor traffic light timings, though they are rare and usually resolved within a day.

On 28 October 2010, the undercarriage of an off-service SBS Transit bus (SBS1932E) burst into flames. The Singapore Civil Defence Force said it received a call at about 2pm and sent two fire engines to the scene. The blaze was quickly put out and no one was hurt in the incident. As such, it was not extended after the initial lifespan of 17 years.

== Location ==
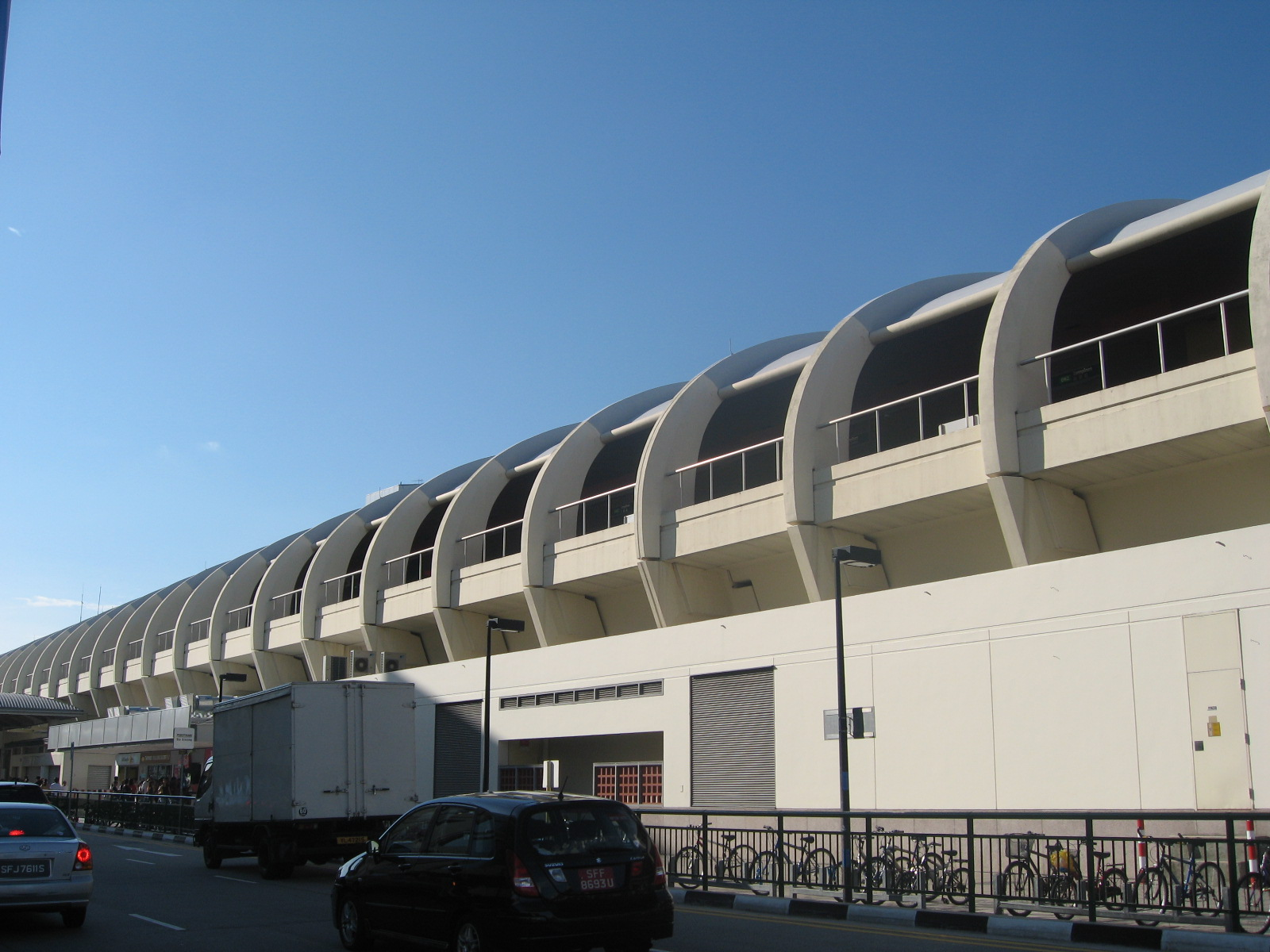
Tampines MRT station

The 3.1-hectare interchange is located in the town centre near Tampines MRT station, with offices and malls in the vicinity. It is housed beside Eastlink Mall in Block 512, an open-air building along Tampines Central 1. It is one of three public bus interchanges in the densely populated town, the others being the nearby Tampines Concourse Bus Interchange and the future Tampines North Integrated Transport Hub further up north.

=== Nearby amenities ===
- Century Square
- Eastlink Mall
- Masjid Darul Ghufran
- Our Tampines Hub
- Sun Plaza Park
- Tampines 1
- Tampines Central Shopping Street
- Tampines Community Plaza
- Tampines Mall

=== Nearby offices ===
- 9 Tampines Grande
- 11 Tampines Concourse
- Abacus Plaza
- AIA Tampines
- CPF Building
- Hitachi Square
- OCBC Tampines Centre One
- OCBC Tampines Centre Two
- NTUC Income Tampines Junction
- NTUC Income Tampines Point
- Pokka Singapore
- Telepark
- Tampines Plaza
- UOB Tampines Centre
- CPF Tampines

== Infrastructure ==
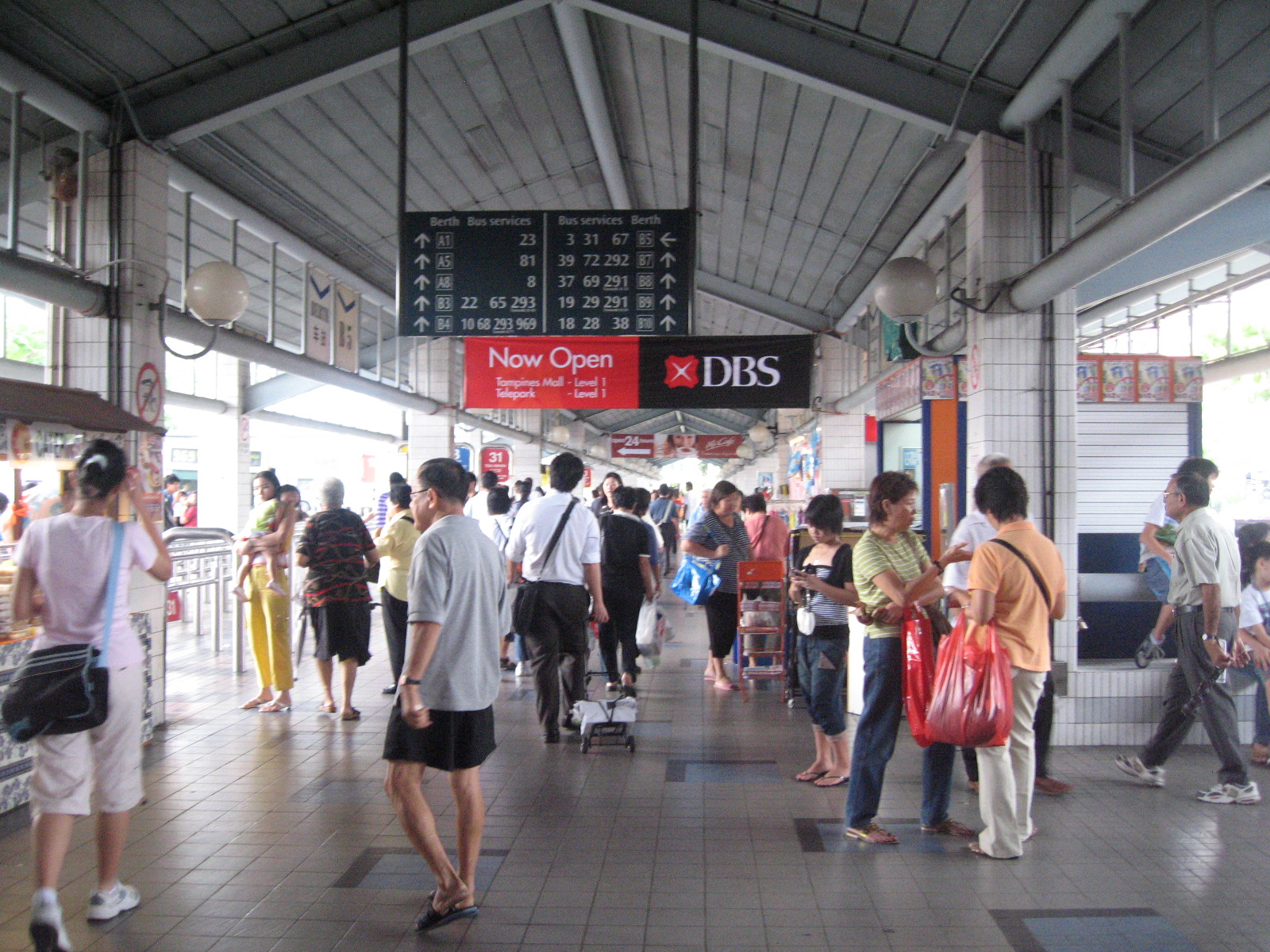
Entrance to the Main Concourse in 2006.

The Tampines Bus Interchange features modern architecture, with little distinct characteristics. It features a white-tiled facade and blue corrugated gable roofs running the length of the two sections — Main Concourse and West Wing. It has the same design as the adjacent Block 513, which was constructed at the same time. The northern end of the West Wing used to house shops, though they were demolished in 2015, together with the iconic cupola structure, for the construction of the DTL section of Tampines station. Shops are now limited to Eastlink Mall at the eastern end of the Main Concourse.

The Main Concourse has 12 sawtooth berths and 2 linear berths, four of which were added beside Exit D of Tampines MRT station in 2017. 31 of the 35 bus services operate from the Main Concourse, most of which serving high-demand routes. The other 4 bus services operate from the West Wing, which has 3 end-on berths with 11 bus lots.

Buses operating from the Main Concourse do not have dedicated lots when off-service, and park at the two bus parks on either side of the Concourse. The north bus park has two entrances leading onto Tampines Concourse and Tampines Central 3; while the south has one entrance to the west. Together, they provide parking spaces for up to 74 buses. Holding areas are also set aside for feeder buses when the berths are occupied (but are usually used when buses are running ahead of schedule).

Besides single-decker buses, the two sections can accommodate double-deckers, as the entrances have a height clearance of 4.5 metres. Articulated buses, operated by SMRT Buses Ltd, can also call at Tampines Bus Interchange, as the sawtooth berths are long enough and dedicates spaces in the south bus park have been provided for temporary parking.

== Routes ==
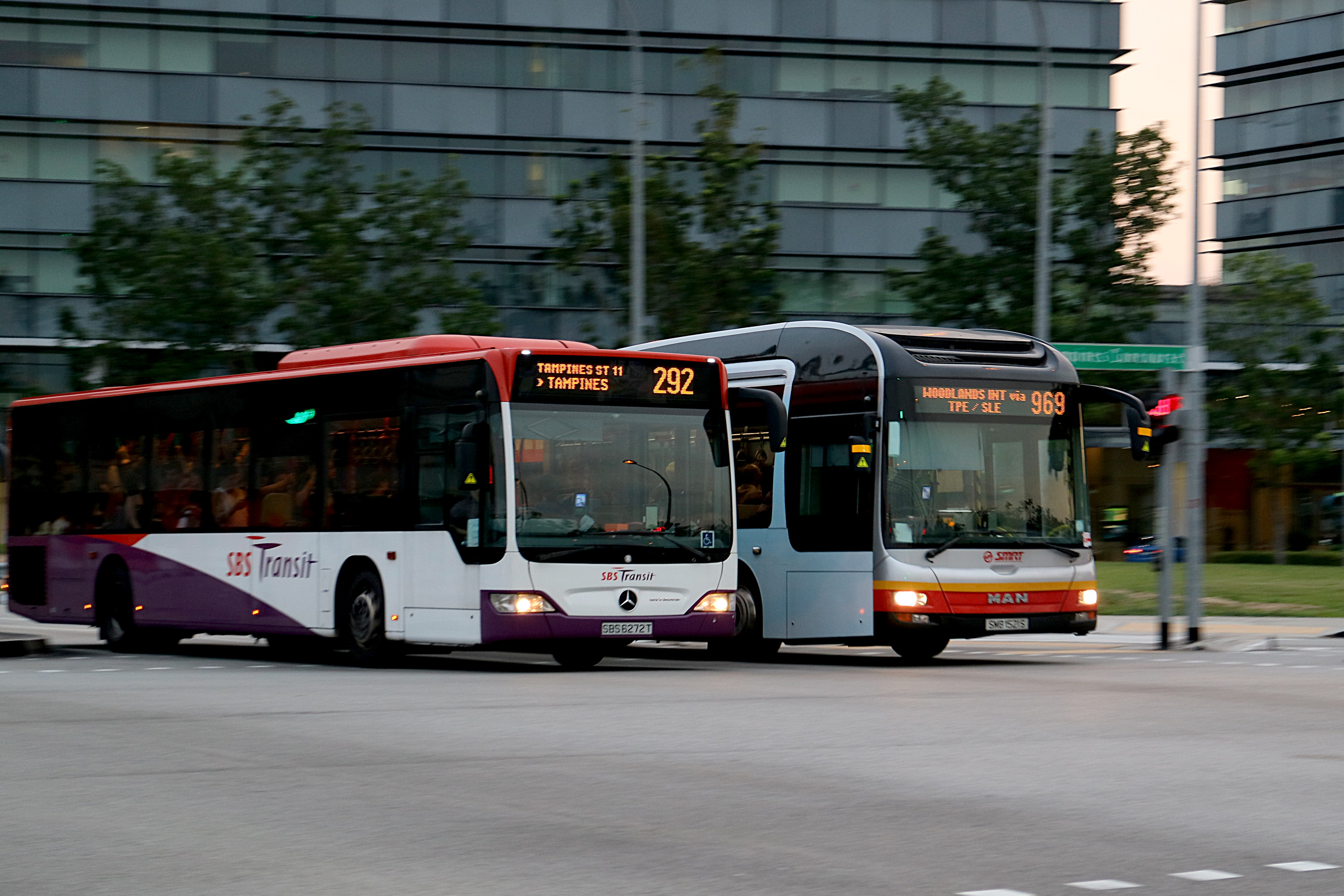
Buses along Tampines Central 1, after exiting Tampines Bus Interchange.

The Tampines Bus Interchange is a high-frequency interchange, with buses on each route departing every 5 to 15 mins depending on the demand. Both intra-town and inter-town routes are available; most of which are intermodal, with the services terminating at another bus interchange in Singapore.

Four routes currently operate into the City Area — 10, 23, 65 and 67. The longest route operating from Tampines Bus Interchange is that of Service 67, with its terminus 33.1 kilometres away at Choa Chu Kang Bus Interchange in the West Region.

Private bus routes, such as private shuttle and cross-border coach services into Peninsular Malaysia, operate from the nearby Tampines Station Bus Shelter or Our Tampines Hub Coach Bay. This is because the Bus Contracting Model (BCM) brings all public buses and related infrastructure, such as Tampines Bus Interchange, under the ownership of the government, and only public transport operators can bid for the right to run services along bus routes planned by LTA.

== Bus contracting model ==
Under the bus contracting model, all bus services operating from Tampines Bus Interchange were divided into five bus packages, operated by four bus operators.

=== List of bus services ===
Operator	Package	Routes
Go-Ahead Singapore	Loyang	3, 3A, 68, 68A, 68B
Go-Ahead Singapore	Tampines	4, 10, 19, 20, 23, 28, 29, 29A, 31, 31A, 37, 38, 65, 69, 72, 81, 127, 127A, 291, 292, 293, 296, 460
SBS Transit	Bishan-Toa Payoh	8
SMRT Buses	Choa Chu Kang-Bukit Panjang	67
Tower Transit Singapore	Sembawang-Yishun	969, 969A
