= Masjid Darul Ghufran =

Mosque in Singapore

مسجد دار الغفران Masjid Darul Ghufran Darul Ghufran Mosque
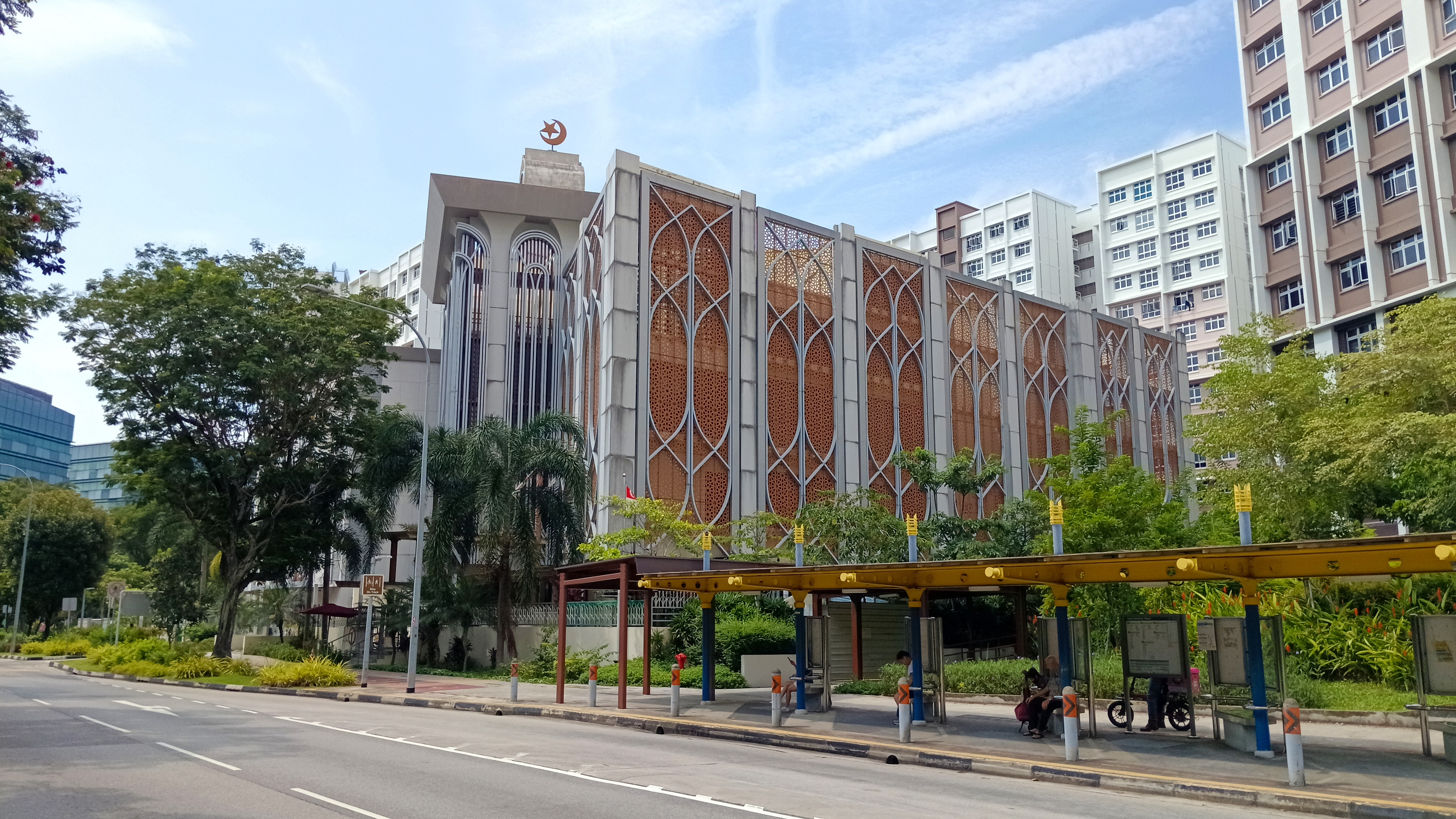
- Masjid Darul Ghufran | Darul Ghufran Mosque

Religion
- Affiliation: Islam
- Branch/tradition: Sunni Islam

Location
- Location: 503 Tampines Avenue 5 Singapore 529651
- Interactive map of مسجد دار الغفران; Masjid Darul Ghufran; Darul Ghufran Mosque
- Coordinates: 1.3554°N 103.9398°E

Architecture
- Type: Mosque
- Style: Islamic architecture, formerly Brutalist architecture
- Completed: December 1990; 35 years ago
- Construction cost: S$6.2 million (1990)

Specifications
- Capacity: 5,500
- Minaret: 1
- Minaret height: 40 m

Website
- darulghufran.org

Masjid Darul Ghufran (Jawi: مسجد دار الغفران) is currently the largest mosque in Singapore, located in Tampines and occupying with a floor area of 5,910 sq metres. It is about 300m from Tampines Bus Interchange, and beside Our Tampines Hub.

== History and design ==
Masjid Darul Ghufran was completed in December 1990 and was officiated by Mr. Haji Othman Haron Eusofe, Member of Parliament for Marine Parade GRC on 12 July 1991.

It was designed by the Housing and Development Board and originally had a brown brick facade. The architecture was described as an "interplay on walls". A dome was added to the minaret, together with Islamic geometric motifs on the windows and entrances after consultations with the community.

After structural failures with the brick facade in 1998, the mosque was later encased in azure blue panelling, which resulted in its nickname of "Menara Biru" (Blue Minaret in Malay) by the residents.

The mosque closed for renovation in September 2016 and reopened on 22 March 2019. The renovation and expansion works increased the capacity of the mosque to meet the growing demands.

== Current status ==
The institution plays an important role in the community, aspiring to be a place of choice for education and dakwah.

The original Masjid Darul Ghufran has space for 4,500 worshippers to pray at one time. After reopening in 2019 following renovation works, the accommodation size increased to 5,500 worshippers, above that of Masjid Assyakirin at 5,000. This makes it the largest mosque in Singapore.

Another mosque will be built in Tampines North, to further ease the increasing load at the mosque.

== Transportation ==
The mosque is accessible from Tampines MRT station and Tampines Bus Interchange.

Visitors arriving via private transport may park at the mosque's basement carpark or the nearby carpark at Our Tampines Hub.

== See also ==
- Islam in Singapore
- List of mosques in Singapore
- Masjid Al-Istighfar
