= Simei =

- Subzone of Tampines Planning Area

Other transcription(s)
  - Chinese: 四美; Sì Meǐ (Pinyin); Sù-bí (Hokkien POJ); Sei^{3} Mei^{5} (Cantonese Jyutping)
  - Malay: Simei
  - Tamil: ஸீமெய் Sīmey (Transliteration)
- Interactive map of Simei
- Coordinates: 1°20′36″N 103°57′15″E
- Country: Singapore
- Region: East Region
- Planning Area: Tampines

Area
  - Total: 2.78 km^{2} (1.07 sq mi)

Population (2026)
  - Total: 37,620
  - Density: 13,500/km^{2} (35,000/sq mi)

Simei (IPA: /ˈsiːmeɪ/ SEE-may) is a subzone in the Tampines planning area within the East Region of Singapore.

== History and etymology ==
The name "Simei" is the pinyinised form of Soo Bee, a minor lane off Jalan Angin Laut that was also known as Jalan Soo Bee. It means "Four Beauties" in Chinese. Formerly called Tampines South, the area was officially renamed Simei in 1985 during the government's policy of "pinyinisation" in the 1980s, similar to the renaming of Nee Soon to Yishun.

Simei used to be a Malay kampong. A large part of it was a Chinese cemetery called Hwa San Tng. It was cleared in February 1982 to make way for the public housing estate at Simei. For a brief period, the roads in the estate were named after the legendary Four Beauties (i.e. Xi Shi, Wang Zhaojun, Diaochan and Yang Guifei) in Chinese history. These confusing names were swiftly changed following complaints.

== Facilities ==
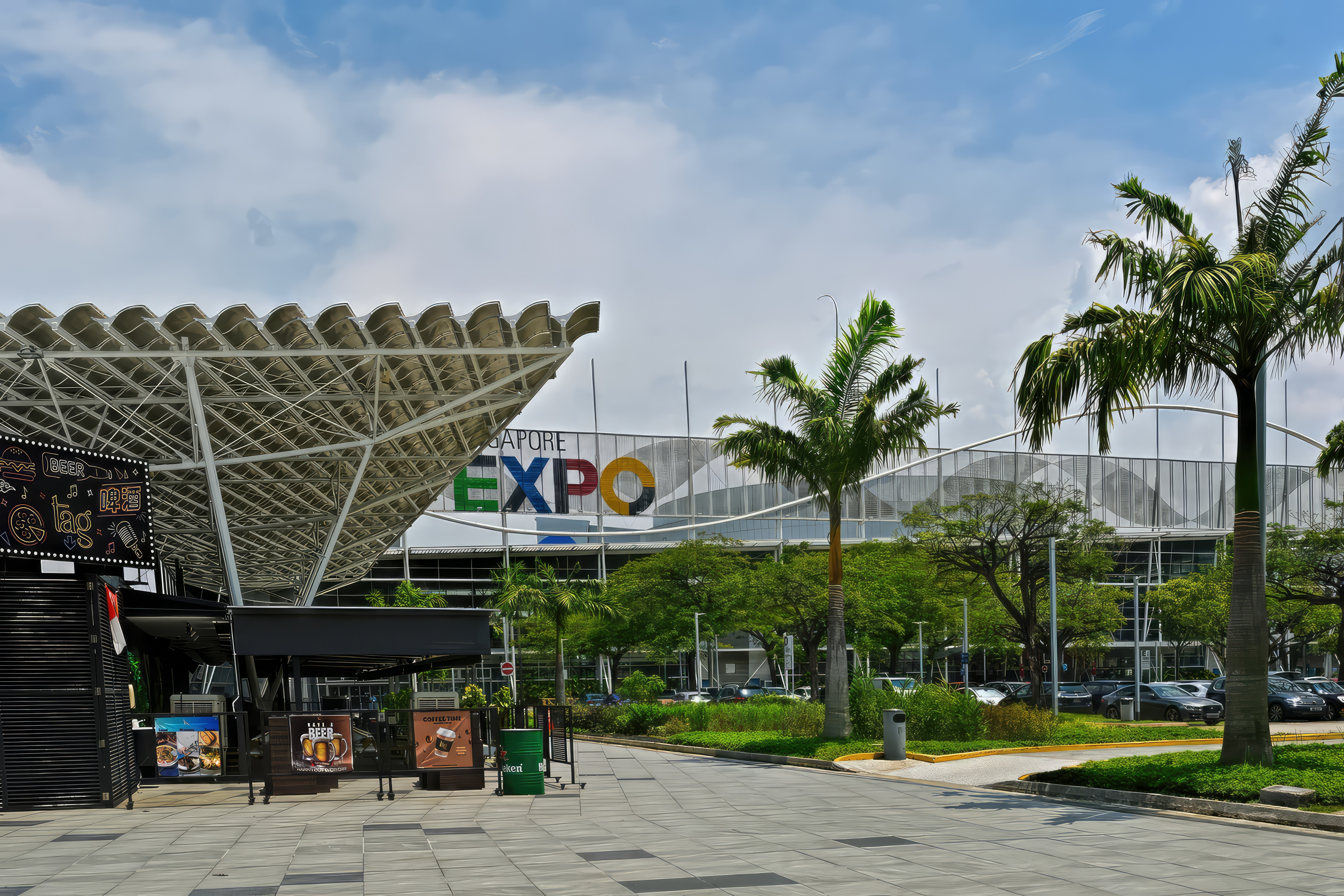
Singapore Expo

Simei is a well-developed estate with plenty of amenities and facilities. There are schools, an MRT station, coffee shops and a shopping mall, Eastpoint Mall. While outside of Simei there is also Singapore Expo, Changi Business Park and Changi City Point nearby. Commercial tenants of the shopping centres include restaurants, supermarkets, department stores, bookstores, jewellery and gift shops.

Simei Park is the only park in Simei, consisting of a playground, elderly fitness corner and running tracks. There are different kinds of residential dwellings in the area, comprising landed properties, condominiums, mansions and public housing flats. For medical needs, Changi General Hospital is located here as well, and serves many Singaporeans living in the eastern area.

== Amenities ==
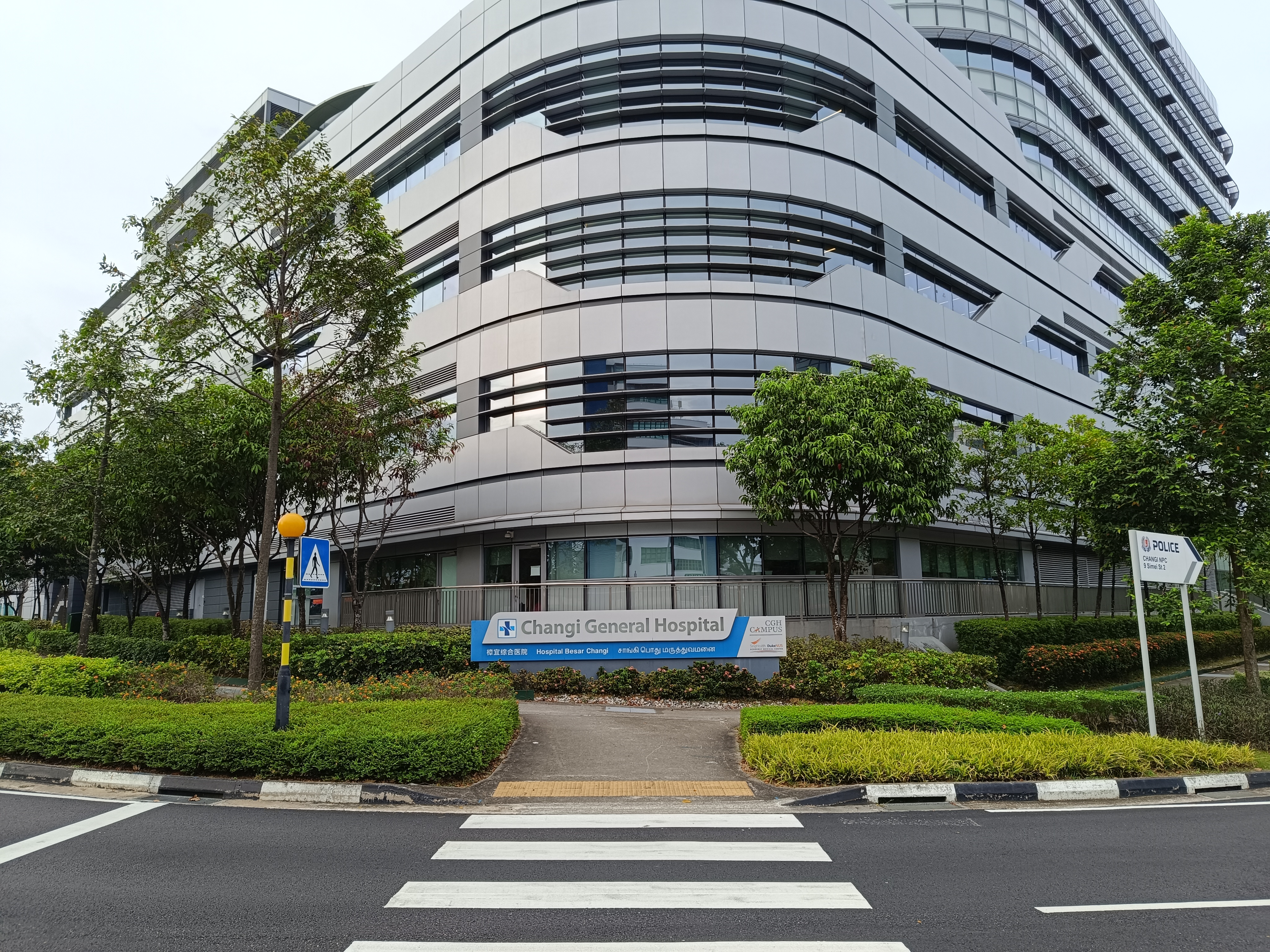
Changi General Hospital

There are wide range of amenities at Simei, including Changi General Hospital (CGH), retail outlets and the Changi Simei Community Club.

Education facilities situated in the town include ITE College East, the Metta Development School, Changkat Primary School, Changkat Changi Secondary School, as well as the Singapore University of Technology and Design (SUTD).

== Transport ==
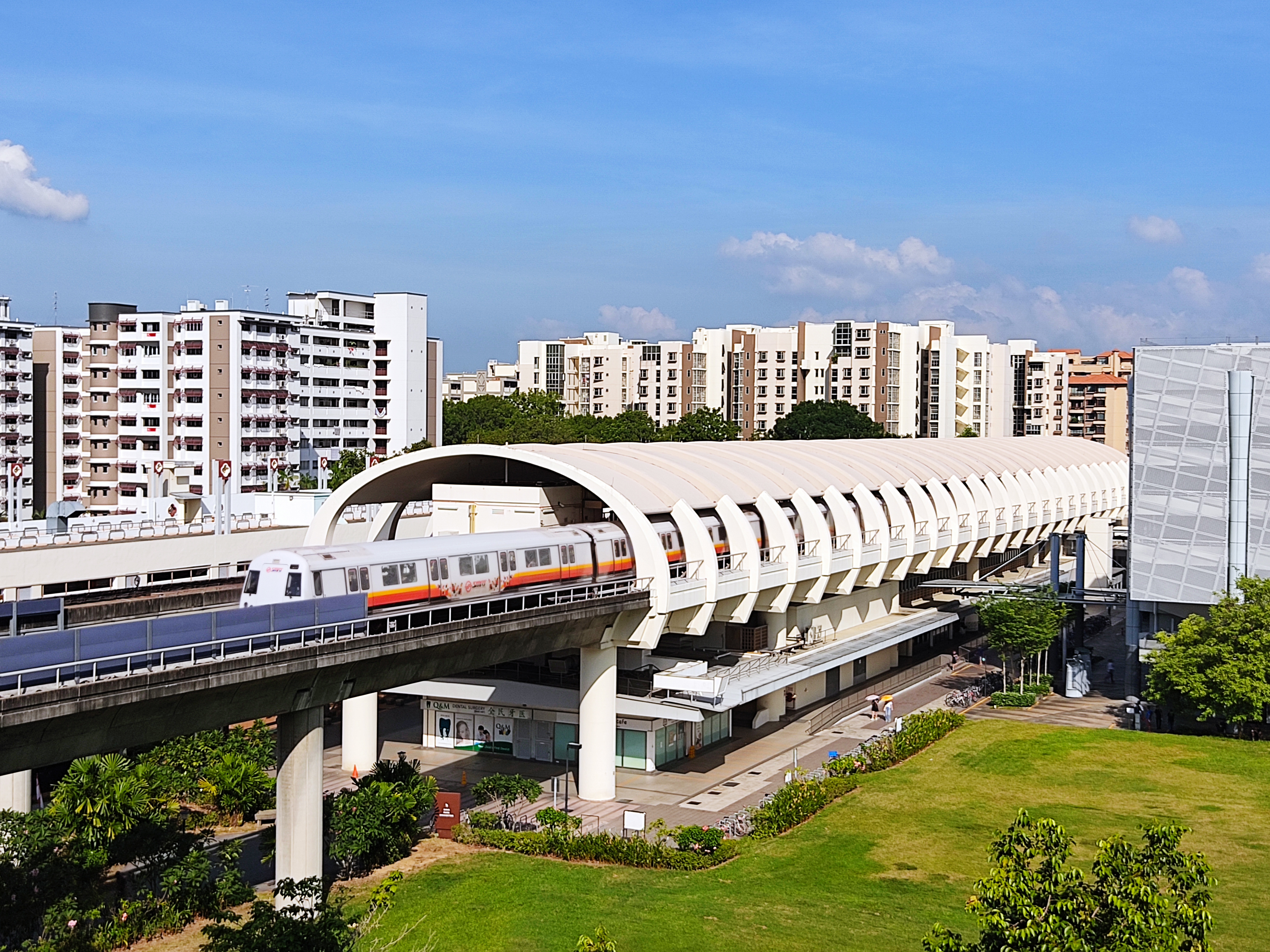
Simei MRT station

Simei is well served by public transport. Most of the town is within 10 minutes walking distance from Simei MRT station. It is also in close proximity to Singapore Changi Airport via the Pan Island Expressway (PIE). Public bus services that serve Simei's town centre, the MRT station and the outskirts include 2, 5, 9, 10, 12, Express 12e, 17, 20, 24, 31, 35, 35M, 38, 47, 48, 118, 531, 753 and TS1. Short-trip bus services that also serve Simei include 9A, 31A, 118A and 118B. Public bus services that ply express sectors along Simei Flyover on the PIE, Simei Avenue and Upper Changi Road East include 27, Express 513, Express 518A and City Direct 661.

=== Mass Rapid Transit (MRT) ===
- EW3 Simei
- DT34 Upper Changi
- DT35 CG1 Expo
- DT36 Xilin (future)

== Politics ==
Following the 2025 Singaporean general election, the current MP serving the Changi–Simei division of East Coast GRC is Jessica Tan of the People's Action Party (PAP).
