= Simei MRT station =

Mass Rapid Transit station in Singapore

Simei EW3 四美 ஸீமெய்
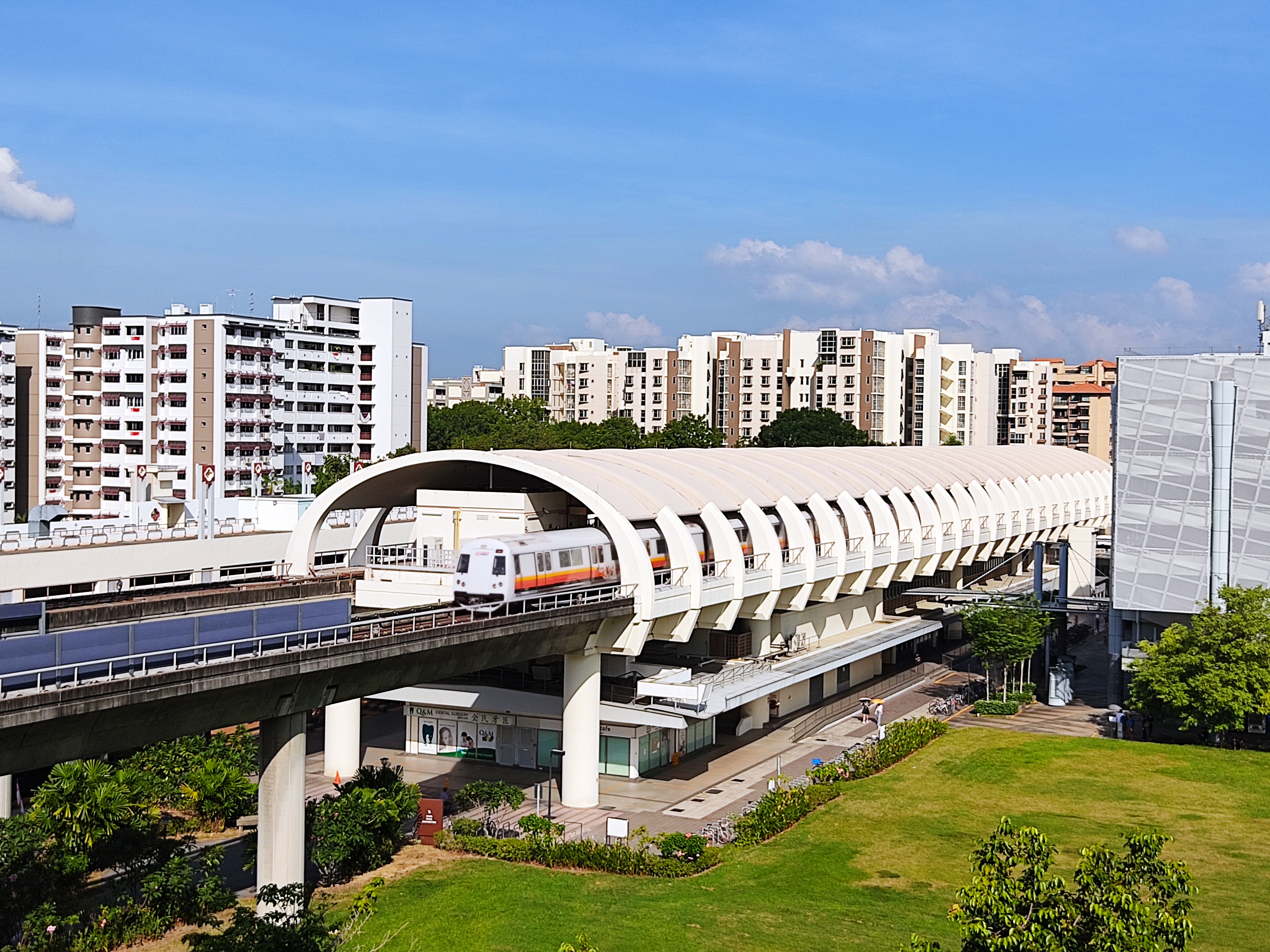
- The exterior of Simei station in 2020

General information
- Location: 30 Simei Street 3, Singapore 529888
- Coordinates: 01°20′36.40″N 103°57′11.42″E
- System: Mass Rapid Transit (MRT) station
- Owner: Land Transport Authority
- Operator: SMRT Trains
- Line: East–West Line
- Platforms: 2 (1 island platform)
- Tracks: 2
- Connections: Bus, Taxi

Construction
- Structure type: Elevated
- Platform levels: 1
- Cycle facilities: Yes
- Accessible: Yes

Other information
- Station code: SIM

History
- Opened: 16 December 1989; 36 years ago
- Closed: 21 and 28 January 2018; 8 years ago (Note: Track works and testing for a new signalling system.); 7 to 10 December 2024; 22 months ago and 29 November to 8 December 2025; 10 months ago (Note: Track works for the East Coast Integrated Depot (ECID).)
- Former names: Tampines South

Passengers
- June 2024: 15,721 per day

Services
Preceding station	Mass Rapid Transit	Following station
Tampines towards Pasir Ris	East–West Line	Tanah Merah towards Tuas Link
Track layout
Location
- Location within Singapore Rail

Simei MRT station is an elevated Mass Rapid Transit (MRT) station on the East–West Line (EWL) in Tampines, Singapore. Operated by SMRT Trains, the station serves nearby landmarks include Eastpoint Mall and Changkat Primary and Secondary School. The station's exterior has the characteristic dome-shaped segmented roof also seen on other elevated EWL stations in the eastern region of the country.

First announced in May 1982 as Tampines South, it was to be constructed as part of Phase II of the MRT system. The name was later changed in 1983. Before constructing the station, 15,000 square metres (18,000 sq yd) of land was acquired for viaducts leading to the station. It commenced operations on 17 December 1988 along with the other stations on the Tanah Merah to Pasir Ris stretch.

Accessibility enhancements were completed in July 2011 as well as additional bicycle parking facilities in October 2012. Half-height platform screen doors and high-volume low-speed fans were installed by August 2011 and the first quarter of 2013, respectively. The station was temporarily closed on some days in 2018 and 2024 for track works, with the former for a new signalling system for the line and the latter for integration works with the East Coast Integrated Depot (ECID).

== History ==
Simei station was first included in the early plans of the MRT system as Tampines South in May 1982. It was later announced to be part of Phase II of the MRT in October 1983 as Simei station.

Before the construction of the station, 15,000 square metres (18,000 sq yd) of land between Jalan Angin Laut and Sunbird Road were acquired in March 1985 to build viaducts to the station. Several single tenders and joint ventures between companies were prequalified for Contract 306 by May 1985, which detailed the construction of Changi Depot to Pasir Ris station, including Simei station. Contract 306 was ultimately awarded to a joint venture between Resource Development Corporation (RDC) and Sata Kogyo for S$92 million (1986) (US$42.25 million) in March 1986. Construction of the station began in May 1986. Before it was opened publicly, there was a preview of the station for nearby residents. The station was opened along with Tanah Merah to Pasir Ris stations on 17 December 1989. During the opening ceremony, then-Minister of State for the Ministries of Communications and Trade and Industry Mah Bow Tan addressed to a crowd of more than 300 guests in Simei station.

External image
- Residents at the preview of Simei station (Note: The article's caption erroneously attributes the location to be Pasir Ris station) Source: The Straits Times

In June 1990, it was announced that Simei station would have three new footpaths leading to the station. This came after a letter was published on The Straits Times revealing that residents of Harvey Avenue, Jalan Angin Laut and Sunbird Road had to walk on a grass verge to get to the station, which became muddy when it rained as well as posing a risk for the elderly and young children during the night. Moreover, the station was criticised for its design in another letter sent to The Straits Times in 1992, claiming that commuters without umbrellas could only walk "along a half-metre wide platform next to plant bins" to the adjacent building compound (Block 248). SMRT responded by revealing that there were plans to build a sheltered walkway between the station and Block 248 but it was put on hold as the land used was to be developed by the Housing and Development Board (HDB) the next year.

On 23 February 1995, at about 7:50 pm, (Note: The New Paper stated that the time was "about 7:45 pm".) a train approaching the station opened its doors early when half of it was in the station, which resulted in people almost falling over as they thought the train had fully stopped. SMRT explained that the driver of the train violated standard procedures as the doors of the train are normally supposed to be on 'automatic mode', such that all of the doors open when the train fully enters a station. However, the driver accidentally activated 'manual mode', which allows the driver to open all of the doors as long as the train is not moving, which is meant to be used with prior permission.

In 2008, the Land Transport Authority (LTA) announced an accessibility enhancement programme for ten stations, including Simei. The programme included adding ramps, covered linkways, and taxi stands with wheelchair access. It was completed by July 2011 at a cost of S$116 million (2011) (US$92.23 million). Simei station was the first batch of ten stations announced in 2010 to have additional bicycle parking facilities as a response to the growing demand for bicycle parking spots, with the installation was completed in October 2012. Following a rise in track intrusions as well as commuters slipping when rushing for the train, the LTA and SMRT decided to install platform screen doors. Half-height platform screen doors were eventually installed and commenced operations at Simei station by August 2011. The station was installed with high-volume low-speed fans by the first quarter of 2013. In 2018, Simei was one of ten stations that was affected by early closures, late openings and full closures on 21 and 28 January of the eastern portion of the EWL, from 5 January to 4 February as a part of works for rail maintenance and checks for a new signalling system for the line.

As a part of track works for the East Coast Integrated Depot (ECID), it was announced by the LTA in November 2024 that Simei station would not be in operation between 7–10 December 2024 as it is part of a safety buffer zone between Tampines and Tanah Merah stations where power has to be turned off in order for the third rail to be safely removed. During the suspension, there was a shuttle bus service for affected commuters that went from Tampines to Tanah Merah stations, including Simei. On 9 December, it was announced that passenger services to the affected stations would resume the following the day as the works were done ahead of schedule, with further track works needed to be done in 2025 and 2026.

== Details ==
Simei station is on the EWL with the station number of EW3, situated between Tampines and Tanah Merah station. When it opened, it had the station number of E10 before being changed to its current station code in August 2001 as a part of a system-wide campaign to cater to the expanding MRT System. As a part of the EWL, the station is operated by SMRT Trains. Like many stations on the initial MRT network, Simei has an island platform. The station operates between 5:00 am and 12:50 am daily, with train frequencies varying from 2 to 5 minutes. It is also wheelchair-accessible and has bicycle facilities.

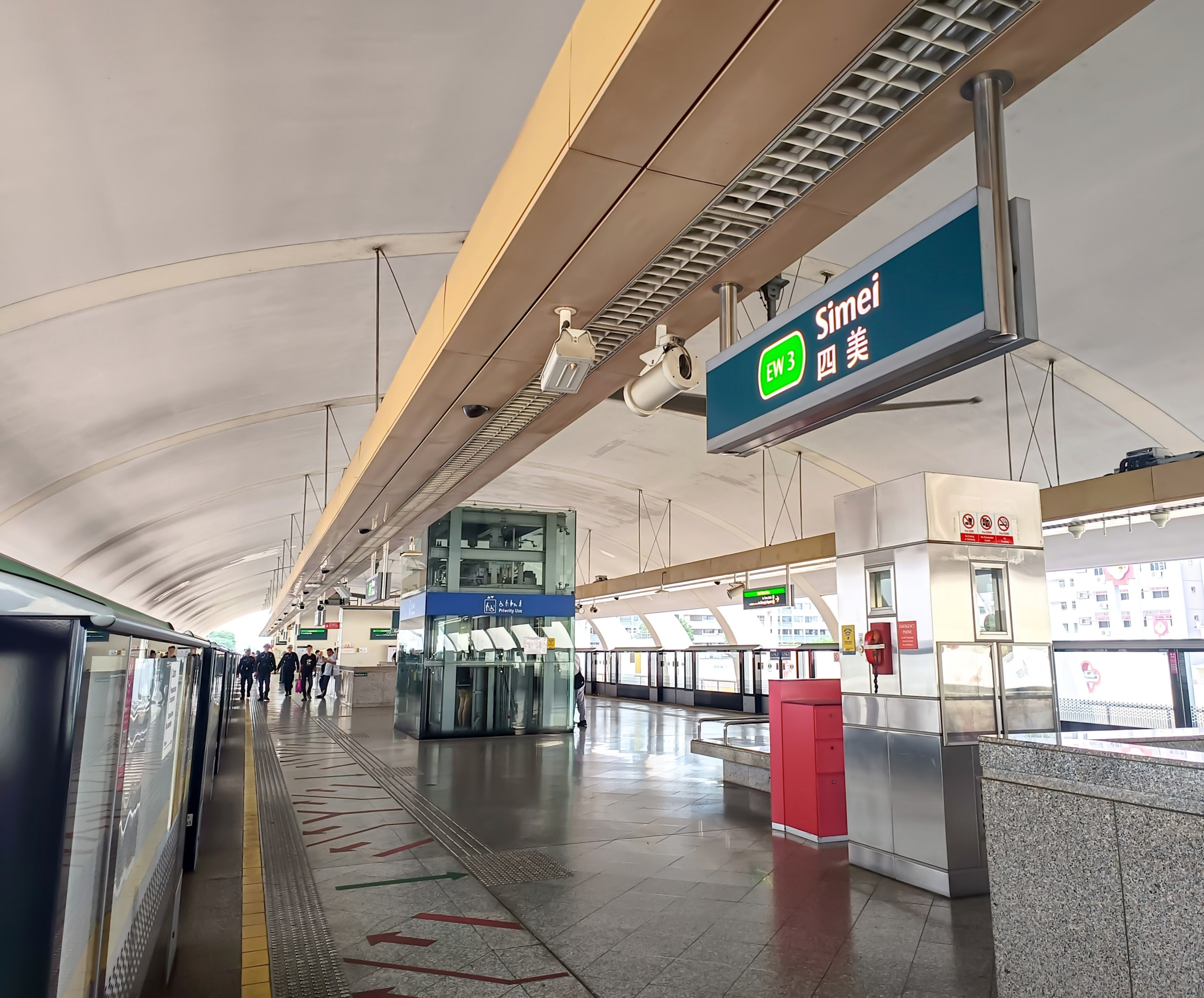
The station's distinctive colour of nutmeg brown used on the ceiling trunking box

Simei station is bounded by Simei Streets 1 and 3 as well as Simei Streets 5 and 6. It has one exit serving surrounding landmarks such as Eastpoint mall, Changkat Primary and Secondary School, Changi Simei Community Club, and Changi Neighbourhood police centre. Similar to other stations on the Tanah Merah-Pasir Ris stretch, Simei has a dome-shaped roof; it has been compared by The Straits Times to a caterpillar in one article and a rib cage in another article. The design was an attempt by the MRT Corporation (MRTC) to give the stations on the EWL an "attractive look". It has a distinctive colour on the doors of restricted areas and ceiling trunking box on the platform to aid in identification, using nutmeg brown.
