= Eastpoint Mall, Singapore =

Shopping mall in Singapore

Eastpoint Mall
- 东福坊
- Location: 3 Simei Street 6, Singapore 528833
- Coordinates: 1°20′33.80″N 103°57′11.10″E
- Opened: 15 November 1996; 30 years ago (original soft opening); 18 January 1997; 29 years ago (original official opening); 2 December 2014; 11 years ago (refurbished opening)
- Developer: Far East Organisation
- Manager: Link REIT
- Owner: NTUC Income Insurance Co-Operative Pte Ltd
- Num. of stores: 156
- Num. of anchor tenants: 3 NTUC FairPrice; Daiso; My First Skool
- Floor area: 214,161 sq ft (19,896.2 m^{2})
- Floors: 8 (2 basements + 6 retail levels)
- Parking: 200
- Public transit: EW3 Simei
- Website: Eastpoint Mall

Eastpoint Mall (Chinese: 东福坊) is a shopping mall located in Simei, Singapore beside Simei MRT station. It was formerly known for its wide selection of educational and enrichment centres and its pet shop (The Pet Safari), which was once the largest in Asia.

The mall is owned by NTUC Income, and is managed by Frasers Property.

== History ==
Eastpoint Mall was developed by Far East Organisation and was completed in November 1996, followed by an official opening in January 1997 by then Minister for National Development Mr Lim Hng Kiang. Like other suburban malls at that time, it had a Studio City cinema, an NTUC Fairprice supermarket, an Oriental Grand department store, food court, a Funpolis arcade and Popular book store as anchors. It also had an array of speciality shops and restaurants. The mall pioneered several firsts, such as a rooftop children's pool and a wet market (The Pasar by FairPrice) on the ground level of the mall.

In 1998, the property was sold to NTUC Income Insurance Co-operative Pte Ltd.

In June 1999, Studio City Cinemas went bust due to low patronage and was replaced by Golden Village in November that year. The wet market was replaced by local pet retailer The Pet Safari. Oriental Grand moved out after filing for bankruptcy, and its space was taken up by Best Denki.

In the early 2000s, the mall underwent a minor facelift and a repositioning exercise in a bid to address its dwindling patronage due to competition from the malls at Tampines and the city. As a result, Golden Village closed in early 2002 and was replaced by a bunch of tuition and enrichment centres. The rooftop children's pool was also closed at the same time as well. In 2006, several anchor tenants, including The Pet Safari and Best Denki, withdrew or moved into smaller premises. Minor renovation works were also carried out as well.

The mall did not undergo any major refurbishments until March 2013, when it was revamped with a new exterior facade, a change in interior layout and an increase in retail space with a refreshed tenant mix. Several anchor tenants returned and were relocated to different levels, such as NTUC FairPrice taking up the entirety of Level 5, and Challenger and Daiso reallocated to Basement 1. The food court was reallocated to Level 4, operated by Food Junction. Level 6 remains allocated to tuition and enrichment centres, a childcare centre and a nautical themed playground. McDonald's, for the first time in the area, was added and positioned in the outer area of the mall, with two levels of patron seating. The mall reopened in December 2014.

In 2027, Eastpoint Mall will be sold from both Frasers Property and NTUC Income Insurance to Link REIT, in exchange of NEX being moved to Frasers Property.
