= Tampines MRT station =

Mass Rapid Transit station in Singapore

Tampines EW2 – DT32 淡滨尼 தெம்பனிஸ்
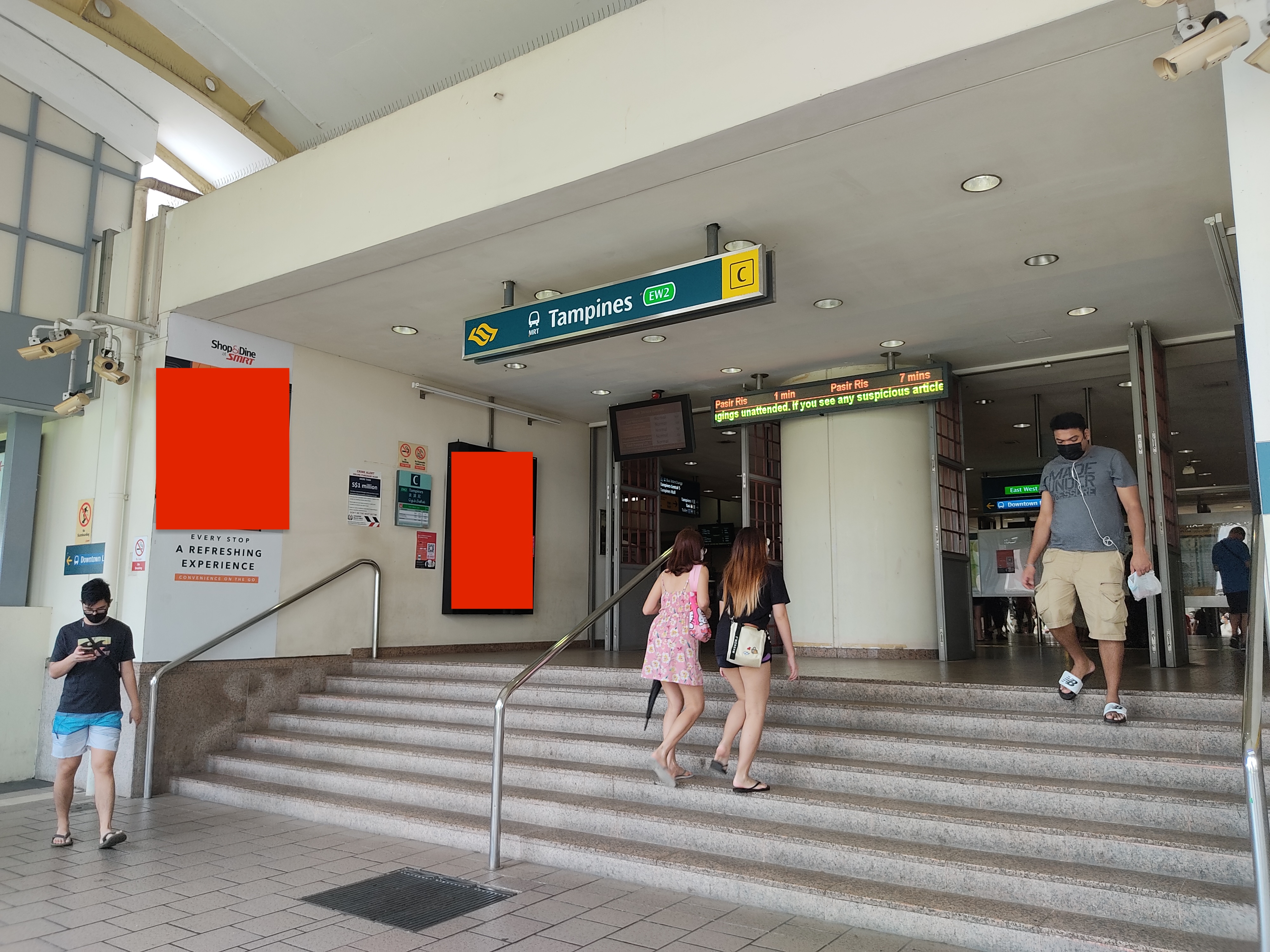
- Exit C of Tampines station

General information
- Location: 20 Tampines Central 1, Singapore 529538 (EWL); 15 Tampines Central 1, Singapore 529544 (DTL)
- Coordinates: 01°21′18″N 103°56′38″E
- System: Mass Rapid Transit (MRT) interchange
- Owner: Land Transport Authority
- Operator: SMRT Trains (East–West Line); SBS Transit (Downtown Line)
- Lines: EWL East-West Line; DTL Downtown Line
- Platforms: 4 (2 island platforms)
- Tracks: 4
- Connections: Tampines, Taxi

Construction
- Structure type: Elevated (East–West Line); Underground (Downtown Line)
- Platform levels: 2
- Parking: Yes (Century Square, Tampines 1, Tampines Mall)
- Cycle facilities: Yes
- Accessible: Yes

History
- Opened: 16 December 1989; 36 years ago (East–West Line); 21 October 2017; 9 years ago (Downtown Line)
- Closed: 21 and 28 January 2018; 8 years ago (Note: Track works and testing for a new signalling system on the East–West Line.)
- Former names: Tampines North

Passengers
- June 2024: 48,791 per day

Services
Preceding station	Mass Rapid Transit	Following station
Pasir Ris Terminus	East–West Line	Simei towards Tuas Link
Tampines West towards Bukit Panjang	Downtown Line	Tampines East towards Expo
Track layout
Location
- Location within Singapore Rail

Tampines MRT station (/ˈtæmpəniːs, -ɪniːs/ TAM-pə-nees or TAM-pin-ees) is a Mass Rapid Transit (MRT) interchange station on the East–West (EWL) and Downtown (DTL) lines in Tampines, Singapore. Located in the town centre next to Tampines Avenue 4, Tampines Central 4 and Tampines Central 5, it is in close proximity to the Tampines and Tampines Concourse bus interchanges. The station also serves the surrounding retail developments of Tampines Mall, Tampines 1 and Century Square.

The EWL station opened on 16 December 1989 as part of the line's eastern extension to the Pasir Ris station. On 20 August 2010, it was announced that the station would become a DTL interchange by 2017. The DTL station, not directly connected to the existing EWL station, was completed on 21 October 2017. The station's EWL exterior has the characteristic dome-shaped segmented roof also seen on other elevated EWL stations in the eastern region of the country, while the DTL station features The Big Round & The Tall Long, an art piece by Studio Juju, as part of the MRT network's Art-in-Transit programme.

== History ==
=== East–West Line (EWL) ===
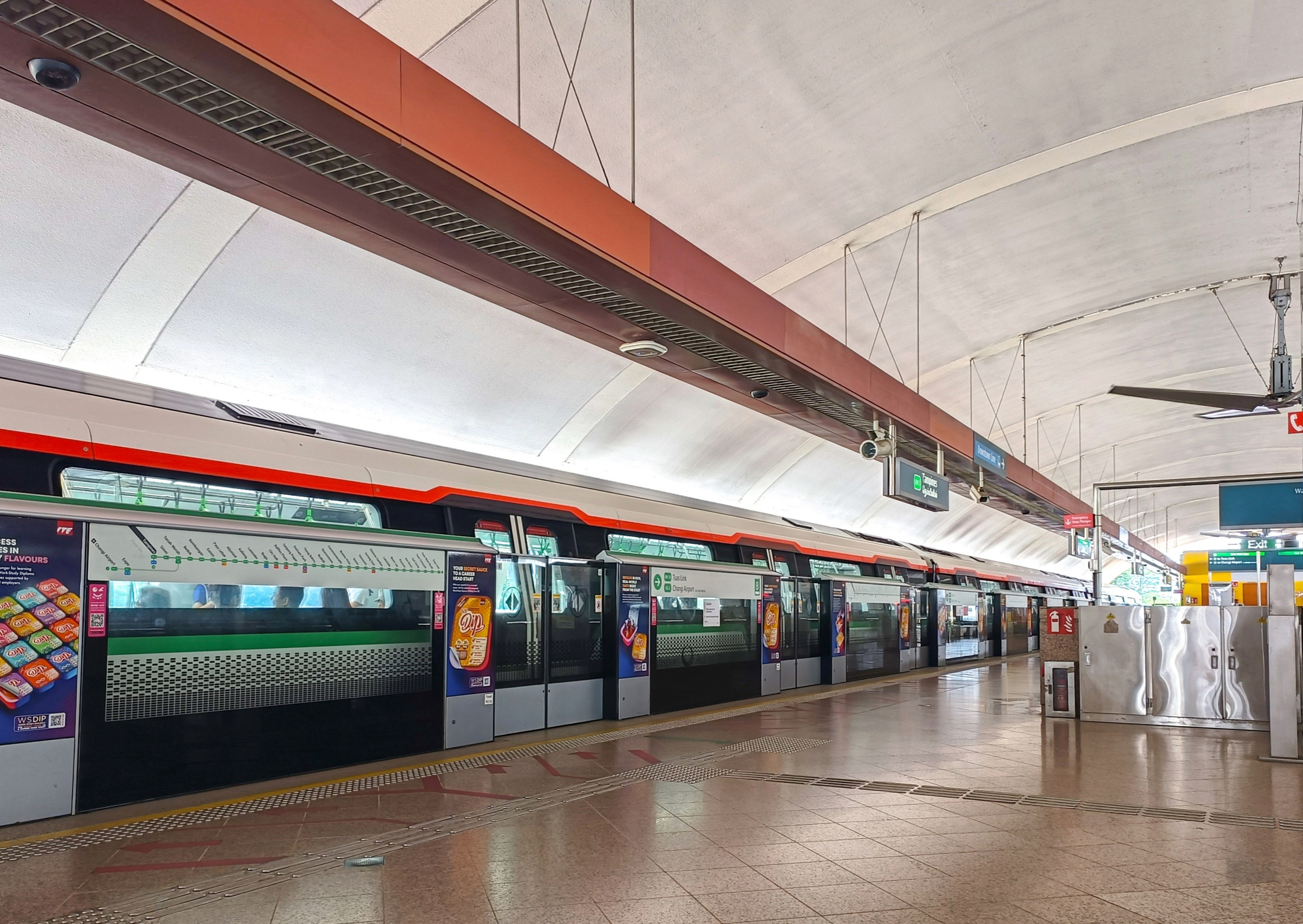
Platform B of the EWL station

In the planning stages of the MRT network, there were two proposed stations, tentatively named "Tampines North" and "Tampines South", on the EWL, with the former being its eastern terminus. The station was later constructed as part of the section between Pasir Ris station and Tanah Merah station, which in turn was part of Phase 2A of the MRT system. Contract 306 for the construction of the stations from Changi Depot to Pasir Ris and 5.5 kilometres (3.4 miles) of tracks was awarded to Sato Kogyo Pte Ltd at a contract sum of S$91.89 million (US$42.2 million) in March 1986. It also included the construction of the Pasir Ris and Simei stations.

On 4 November 1989, deputy prime minister Goh Chok Tong announced that the EWL would be extended to the Pasir Ris station. The Tampines station opened on 16 December 1989, in tandem with the extension. The opening of the station was generally welcomed by residents of Tampines and Pasir Ris, who hoped for shorter travelling times to their workplaces in the city.

The Tampines station was one of the first five MRT stations to be retrofitted with lifts and ramps in 2002, alongside enhancement works such as toilets for the disabled. (Note: The others were the Novena, Dhoby Ghaut, Outram Park and Somerset stations) These works, which cost S$81.5 million (US$45.5 million), were part of a system-wide programme to make the MRT network more wheelchair-accessible after lobbying by the Handicaps Welfare Association. In 2009, enhanced bicycle parking facilities were installed at the stations of Tampines, Yishun and Pasir Ris as part of a pilot programme, providing basic shelters and a greater flexibility to lock bicycles at either the frame or wheels. The contract for the bicycle parking facilities was awarded to Shincon Industrial Pte Ltd at a contract sum of S$1.43 million (US$1 million).

In 2011, half-height platform screen doors were installed at this station as part of the Land Transport Authority's (LTA) programme to improve safety in MRT stations. Later, on 30 March 2012, Tampines was the first MRT station to have high-volume low-speed fans installed above the station platforms as part of a network-wide programme to improve ventilation at the platforms of elevated stations.

=== Downtown Line (DTL) ===
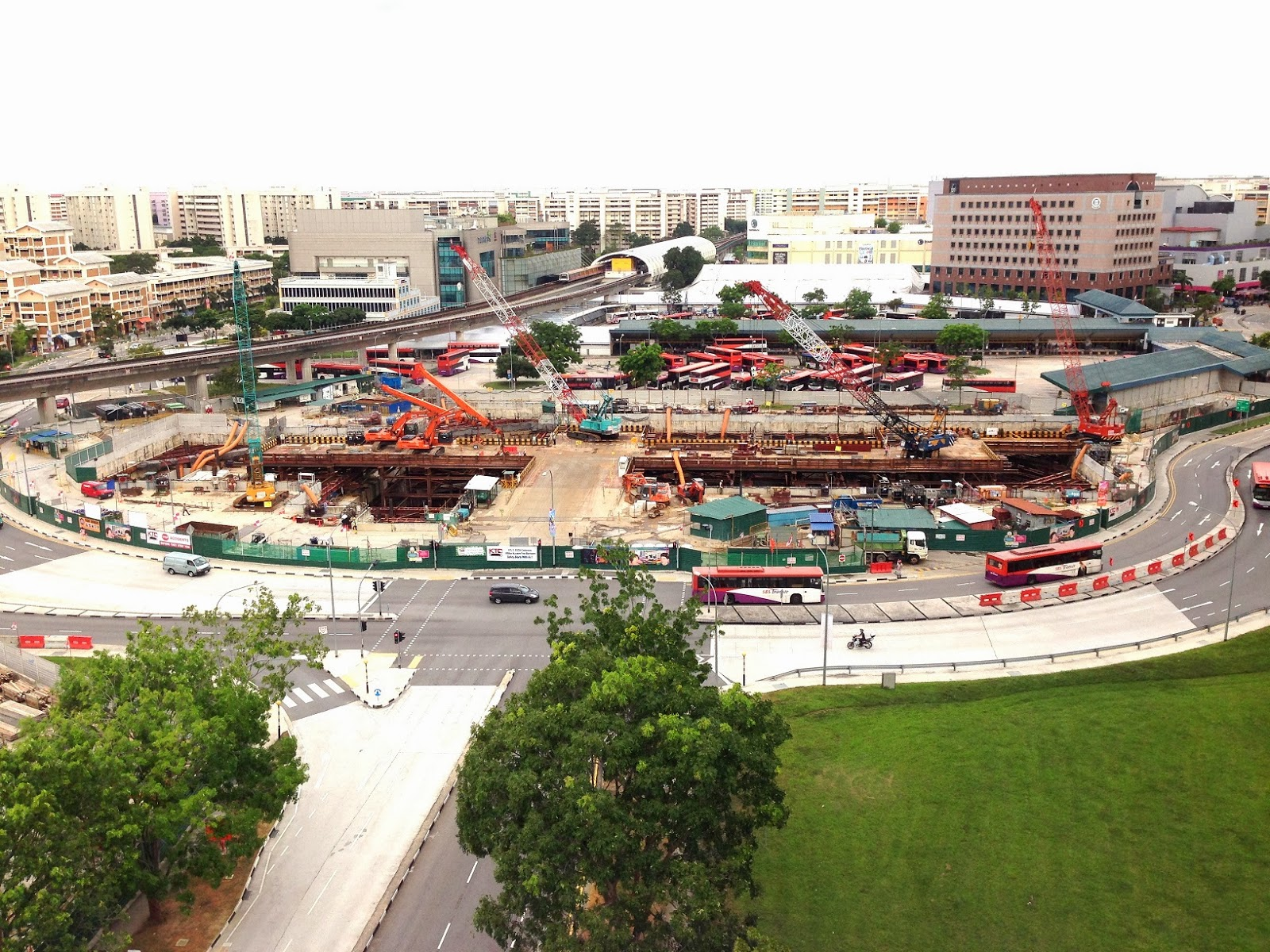
DTL construction site in July 2013

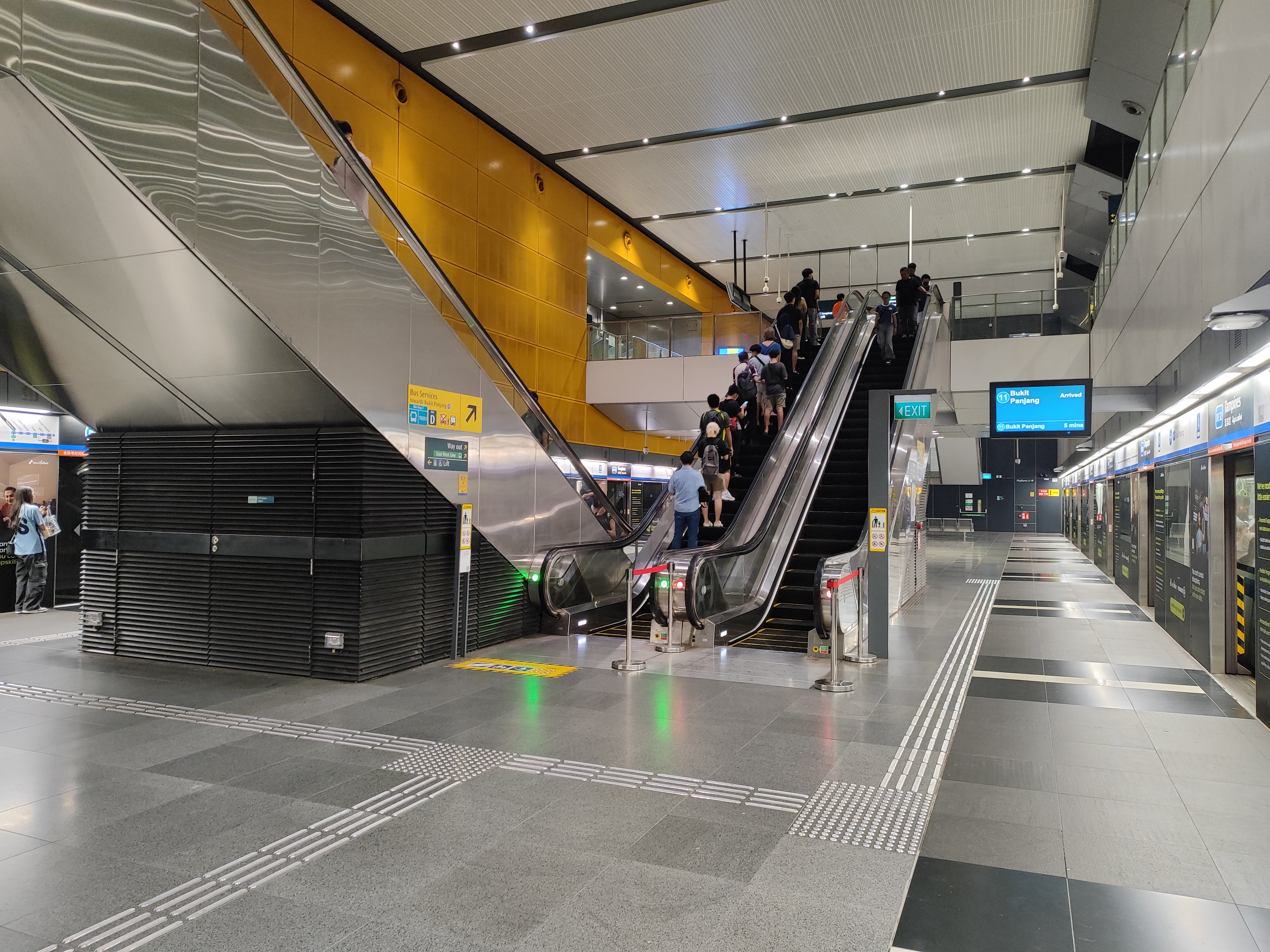
Platform level of the DTL station

On 20 August 2010, the LTA announced that Tampines station would become a DTL interchange. The DTL station would be constructed as part of the 21-kilometre (13-mile) Stage 3, consisting of 16 stations between the River Valley (now Fort Canning) and Expo stations. The stage was expected to be completed in 2017.

Contract 925A for the construction of the DTL station was awarded to KTC Civil Engineering & Construction Pte Ltd at a contract sum of S$118.5 million (US$94.2 million) in July 2011. The construction started that month and was targeted to complete in 2017.

The station was constructed using the top-down method to minimise movement to the existing viaducts for the EWL. Due to limited space, special low-headroom machines were utilised to facilitate part of the works. To prevent disruption to the operations of the bus interchange and the shops, a paid link was not constructed between the DTL and EWL stations.

On 31 May 2017, it was announced that the station, together with the rest of DTL3, would be opened on 21 October that year. Passengers were offered a preview of the station along with other DTL3 stations at the stage's open house on 15 October.

=== Incidents ===
On 8 August 2003, a westbound train lost traction current at 10.13 pm and stalled along the track between Pasir Ris and Tampines. An empty train was used to push the train towards Tampines and service resumed at 10.35 pm. However, 21 minutes later, the traction current tripped again between the same two stations in both directions. SMRT staff only restored the eastbound side before the end of operating hours; detrainment occurred after 73 passengers were stuck in a westbound train. During both delays, eastbound services terminated at Tampines and alternative transport was provided for affected passengers.

On 21 January 2008, a maintenance works train carrying out works between Tampines and Simei (westbound) broke down, causing a disruption from 5.28 am to 12.45 pm on both the eastbound and westbound services from Pasir Ris and Tanah Merah and affecting 57,000 commuters. SMRT was fined S$387,000 (US$274,000) on 10 March after LTA investigations concluded that the disruption was due to non-compliance with operating procedures by the personnel. This was specifically on securing the parked portion of the maintenance train, which comprised a locomotive and a wagon. According to operating procedures, during maintenance works, while the parked portion of the maintenance train was detached and at a distance from the working zone while the portion comprising a locomotive and a rail grinding vehicle was to proceed with maintenance. However, investigations from LTA and SMRT showed that SMRT did not apply the locomotive's parking brake. There was also no wheel chock placed to prevent movement along the gradient of the track. It was found that a roll-back would have been prevented had SMRT followed operating procedures. On 20 March, SMRT announced that it had decided to appeal to the LTA against the fine. In a letter, it said that it had provided free shuttle bus services to help affected commuters and mobilised more than 300 staff for on-site recovery, crowd management, dissemination of information and preparation for resumption of service. On 3 April, LTA turned down SMRT's appeal for a lower fine and ordered full payment within two weeks.

== Station details ==
=== Location ===
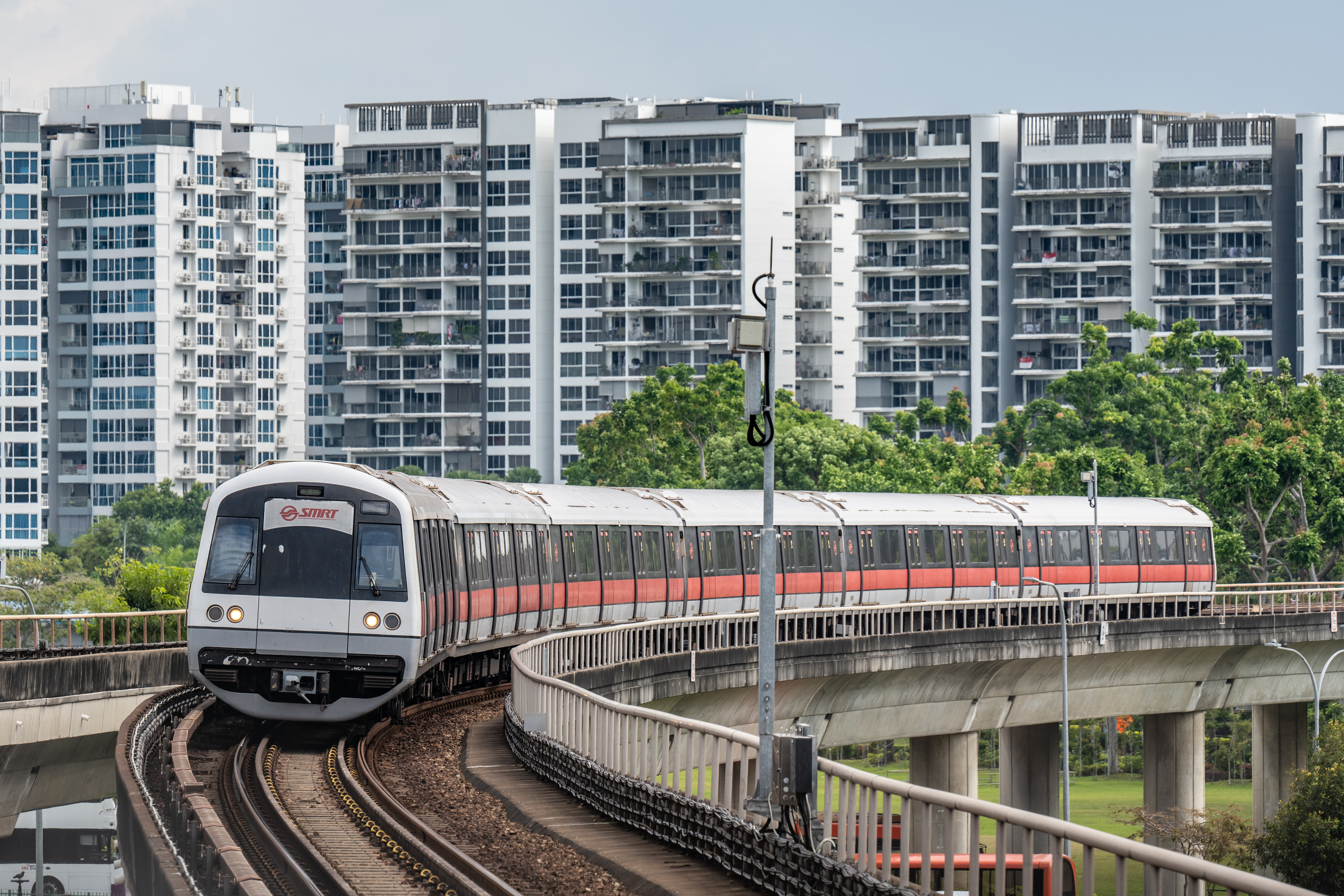
A C751B train pulling into Tampines EWL station

The station serves the town of Tampines. It surrounded by the retail developments of Century Square, Tampines Mall and Tampines 1, in addition to commercial buildings such as the HDB (Housing and Development Board) Branch Office, AIA Tampines, the CPF (Central Provident Fund) Tampines Building and two Income Insurance buildings. It is also within walking distance to the Tampines North Community Club, Tampines Polyclinic, Our Tampines Hub and the Masjid Darul Ghufran.

The station also serves two bus interchanges: the Tampines Bus Interchange and the Tampines Concourse Bus Interchange. The latter bus interchange, which opened on 18 December 2016, was built as an extension of the former.

=== Services ===
The station is an interchange between the EWL and the DTL. The official station code is EW2/DT32. On the EWL, it is between the Pasir Ris and Simei stations. At opening, it had the station code of E11, which was changed to the current alphanumeric style in August 2001 as a part of a system-wide campaign to cater to the expanding MRT System.

On the DTL, the station is between the Tampines West and Tampines East stations. The DTL station is not directly connected to the EWL station and hence commuters have to exit either of the stations to transfer to the other line via a 300-metre (980 ft) sheltered walkway. Transfers that do not exceed 15 minutes are considered "valid transfer[s]" that are part of a "journey".

On both lines, the station is open between 5:00 am and 12:50 am daily and has headways of 2 to 5 minutes depending on peak hours.

=== Design ===
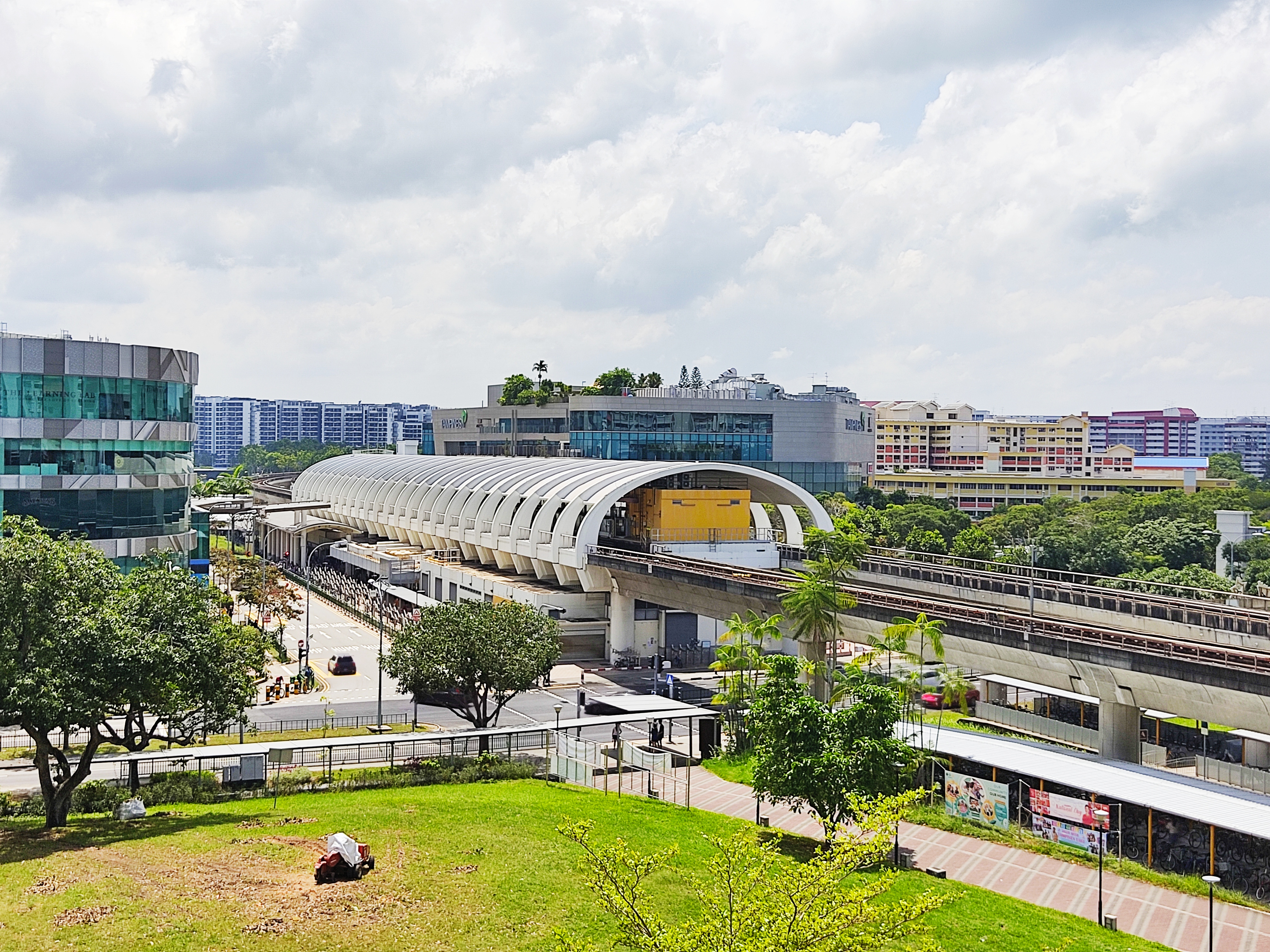
Exterior of the Tampines EWL station

Like most EWL elevated stations on the eastern segment on the line, Tampines station has the notable feature of the dome-shaped roof, segmented like a caterpillar, over the platform level. The design was an attempt by the MRT Corporation (MRTC) to give the stations on the EWL an "attractive look". The colour scheme used for the station is rustic brown, reflected on the doors to the restricted areas and the ceiling trunking box at the platform level of the station.

The DTL station, designed by Greenhilli, is intended to be "people-centric" while built at an affordable cost. It is designed to facilitate movement through interconnectivity, spatial volume, asymmetry, colour and "super-graphics". The spacious interior improves visual awareness within the station, fostering "intuitive" wayfinding and giving the station identity that reflects the locality of the area. The architecture of the DTL station allows future integration with upcoming developments, including provisions for additional underground developments above the station structure.

=== Public artworks ===
As part of the MRT system's Art-in-Transit Programme, (Note: Public art showcase which integrates artworks into the MRT network) The Big Round & The Tall Long by Studio Juju is an artwork consisting of two huge shapes – the Big Round and the Tall Long – on the opposite walls of the DTL platforms. The Big Round, which is 7 metres (23 ft) in diameter, is "stripped away" from the excessiveness of "form and details", creating a singular, expressive geometry. The Tall Long, which is 9 metres (30 ft) in height, is "buoyant" and "stretches upwards". Both of these shapes reflect the dimensions of the station and "gave polarities" to the nearly symmetrical station, bringing a sense of "calm and order" to the station atmosphere. The shapes were also meant to "fill the void" between the vastness of space and commuters. These shapes, enhanced by the reflecting benches on the platforms, act as wayfinders for passengers travelling around the station.

Additionally, there are a series of murals as part of SMRT's Comic Connect. (Note: A public art showcase of heritage-themed murals in the train operator's stations) Created by local artist Kevin Lee, the 4 murals feature Our Tampines Hub (OTH), the Masjid Darul Ghufran, and the Tampines Round Market & Food Centre. Particularly, the Masjid Darul Ghufran mural depicts a fusion of the mosque during the 1990s with its azure blue panelling and in the present. The process behind the artwork involved Lee visiting Tampines to take walks near the mural's subjects, mingling with the residents, and participate in activities.
