= Tampines 1 =

- Location: Tampines, Singapore
- Address: 10 Tampines Central 1, Singapore 529536
- Opened: 1 April 2009; 17 years ago
- Developer: ARMF II (Tampines) Pte Ltd
- Manager: Frasers Property
- Architect: Architects 61 Pte Ltd
- Num. of stores: Approx. 176
- Floor area: 265,000 square feet (24,600 m^{2})
- Floors: 7
- Public transit: EW2 DT32 Tampines
- Website: Tampines 1

Tampines 1 is a shopping mall located in the east of Singapore next to the Tampines MRT station. The mall opened on 1 April 2009.

== Overview ==
Tampines 1 was formerly the site of DBS Tampines Centre and Pavilion Cineplex. After DBS Tampines Centre was demolished, construction work on the mall began in March 2007. Spotlight had moving out sales and closed down the outlet on 1 January 2007. DBS/POSB Bank was relocated to Tampines Mall on 11 December 2006.

The mall obtained Temporary Occupation Permit (TOP) on 31 March 2009 and was opened to public on the following day.

The mall, spread over five storeys and one basement, is the first suburban mall in Singapore with a dedicated swimming pool. The shopping mall is located at the Tampines Regional Centre, where Tampines MRT station and Tampines Bus Interchange are situated very close to the mall. It is also located next to Century Square Shopping Centre as well as Tampines Mall.

The total development cost of the project was estimated to be S$450 million and the building was upgraded between 17 March 2012 and 10 November that year. Times Bookstores was replaced by MUJI, Manpuku was replaced by Daiso and Sony Style was replaced by MOF My Izakaya.

Tampines 1 had received such changes. In September 2014, Payless ShoeSource was closed down, and replaced by Sephora. In March 2015, New Look was closed down, replaced by Browhaus. In 2017, both Forever New and Topshop were replaced by The Editor's Market, UOB Bank and HSBC Bank due to high rental. With the closure of all Esprit stores on 7 April 2020, Playdress took over the space. Uniqlo had its first flagship store at Tampines 1 from April 2009 until 17 January 2021. Don Don Donki took over the Uniqlo and Browhaus shop space, and opened on 22 October 2021. Tampines 1 underwent renovation works from August 2023 and was completed in May 2024.

With the closure of Isetan Tampines Mall on November 2025 and BHG Select Tampines Mall by February 2026, Sephora moved out from Tampines 1 to Tampines Mall and in its place is BYD showroom and Setirom. Daiso also graduated from Tampines 1 and will be moving to Century Square, with the closure took place on 21 June 2026 amid being loved by Tampines community.

Tampines 1 tenants include Pepper Lunch, Muji, Sushiro, Challenger, 4Fingers Crispy Chicken, Love Bonito, DMK, Cold Storage, Hawker's Street and Awfully Chocolate.

== Controversy ==
Tampines 1 received criticism for sending a racially discriminatory email to a potential tenant.
