= Century Square =

- 世纪广场
- Location: Tampines, Singapore
- Coordinates: 1°21′8.5″N 103°56′37.5″E
- Address: 2 Tampines Central 5, Singapore 529509
- Opened: 28 September 1995; 31 years ago (original soft opening); 25 November 1995; 30 years ago (original official opening); 6 June 2018; 8 years ago (refurbished opening)
- Manager: Frasers Property
- Owner: Century Square Holding Pte Ltd
- Num. of stores: 218 (upon reopening)
- Num. of anchor tenants: Ichiban Boshi; PrettyFIT; FairPrice Finest; Kiddy Palace; DBS/POSB Bank
- Floor area: 200,000 sq ft (19,000 m^{2}) Net Lettable Area
- Floors: 6 levels
- Parking: 308 (2 basement levels)
- Public transit: EW2 DT32 Tampines
- Website: www.centurysquare.com.sg

Century Square (Chinese: 世纪广场) is a 6-storey shopping mall in Tampines, Singapore. It is located near Tampines MRT station and next to Tampines Mall. Opened in 1995, Century Square underwent expansion in 2005 and renovations in 2018.

== History ==
Developed by First Capital Corporation Ltd (now GuocoLand), Century Square was opened in July 1995 with 63 tenants, officially opening on 25 November 1995 by Minister for Home Affairs Wong Kan Seng. It was one of the first shopping malls in Tampines, along with Tampines Mall which opened in December that year. The mall featured a K-mart department store (later replaced by Metro), a privately owned Century Cineplex managed by Shaw Theatres, Food Junction, SAFE Superstore, and a Shop N Save supermarket.

Nine years later, it was sold to AsiaMalls Management Pte Ltd (ARMF Pte Ltd).

Century Square underwent a minor renovation under the new management. In 2007, Metro closed its doors and was replaced by BHG. Many new stores and brands were added along with a refreshed tenant mix by taking up a portion of Metro's former premises, thus becoming a ladies focused mall.

The mall did not underwent any major renovations until August 2017, when it closed its doors for a nine-month extensive refurbishment from September 2017 till June 2018. The building's facade was modernised, and the interior layout was changed.

With the reopening of Century Square, it had Ichiban Boshi, Gifts Greetings, PrettyFIT, Miniso, Moda Paolo, DBS/POSB Bank, Jollibee, FairPrice Finest, Haidilao, Kiddy Palace, The Coffee Bean & Tea Leaf, and The Food Market by Food Junction. The cinema was then managed by Filmgarde Cineplexes before passing to Cathay Cineplexes until it ceased operations in August 2025.

Prime Food and Grocer were replaced by Lola's Cafe and FairPrice Finest in January 2024. ToTT was briefly reverted to Kiddy Palace and SHINE was briefly replaced by Miniso.

== See also ==
- Tampines Mall
- Tampines 1
- White Sands
- Eastpoint Mall
