= Tampines Mall =

Coordinates: 1°21′9″N 103°56′41″E

- Location: Tampines, Singapore
- Address: 4 Tampines Central 5, Singapore 529510
- Opened: 18 November 1995; 30 years ago (Soft opening); 9 February 1996; 30 years ago (Official opening)
- Developer: CapitaMall Trust
- Manager: CapitaMalls Asia
- Owner: CapitaMall Trust
- Num. of stores: 160
- Num. of anchor tenants: 9 NTUC FairPrice; Golden Village; Uniqlo; Yamaha Music School; Toys R Us; Courts; Kopitiam; Popular; Sephora
- Floor area: 314,669 square feet (29,233.7 m^{2})
- Floors: 6
- Public transit: EW2 DT32 Tampines
- Website: Tampines Mall

Tampines Mall (Chinese: 淡滨尼广场; pinyin: Dànbīnní Guǎngchǎng) is a suburban shopping mall located at Tampines Central 5 in Tampines, Singapore, next to Century Square as well as Tampines 1. It was completed in 1995.

== History ==
In 1992, DBS Land, PERNAS and NTUC FairPrice formed a joint venture company Tampines Mall Pte Ltd to develop a shopping mall beside Tampines MRT station. Tampines Mall Pte Ltd was owned by Emerald Holdings (fully owned by DBS Land), Quek Shin & Sons Pte Ltd (Singapore subsidiary of PERNAS) and NTUC FairPrice with 55 percent, 20 percent and 25 percent stake respectively. DBS Land and NTUC FairPrice had successfully tendered for the 12,600 sq m land in a HDB tender for $93.8 million. The shopping mall was proposed to be five-storey high with a lettable area of 30,000 sq m.

Singapore Piling and Civil Engineering, a subsidiary of Hwa Hong Corp, won the main building contract for $73.5 million.

The mall was completed in November 1995 and was officially opened by Minister for Communications and Member of Parliament for Tampines Group Representation Constituency Mah Bow Tan in February 1996. Like suburban malls completed at that time, it had various anchor tenants, such as an Isetan department store, a Golden Village cineplex, a Kopitam food court, an NTUC FairPrice supermarket, a Popular bookstore, Toys 'R' Us and more than 100 specialty shops. It was one of the largest suburban malls in Singapore back then.

The mall was refurbished in 2004, comprising the installation of a large screen at the roof terrace, and the addition of water features to provide a cooling environment. It had its second refurbishment in 2014, converting the roof level into an education hub, and giving a facade a new appearance. The food court, cinema and Basement 1 shops were renovated as well.

The mall underwent its third refurbishment in from April 2022 to November 2022, this time rearranging the shops in level 2.

In May 2025, anchor tenant Isetan department store decided to close at the end of its lease on 30 October 2025.
