= Public buses of Singapore =

Main public transport system in Singapore

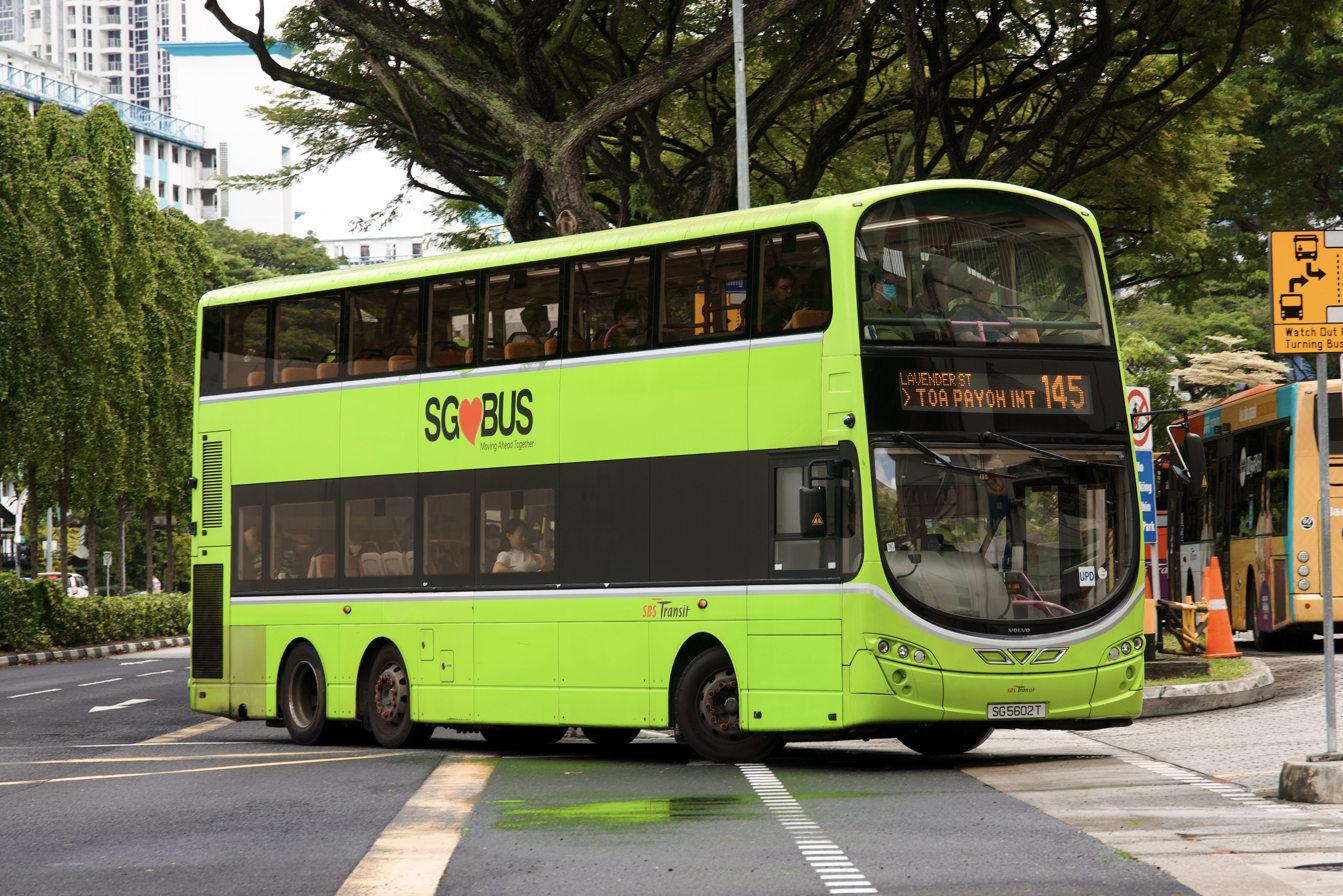
- Volvo B9TL double-decker bus operating on SBS Transit, Singapore's largest public bus operator by market share
- Parent: Land Transport Authority
- Locale: Singapore
- Service type: Transit bus
- Routes: 300+
- Stops: 5,103 (2024)
- Depots: 12
- Fleet: approximately 5,800 (2024)
- Daily ridership: 3.6 million
- Fuel type: Diesel; Hybrid; Electric
- Operator: SBS Transit; SMRT Buses; Tower Transit Singapore; Go-Ahead Singapore

Public transport bus services form a significant part of public transport in Singapore, with over 3.6 million rides taken per day on average as of December 2021. There are over 300 scheduled bus services and over 100 short-trip variants, operated by SBS Transit, SMRT Buses, Tower Transit Singapore and Go-Ahead Singapore. The newest bus operator, Go-Ahead Singapore, started operations on 4 September 2016. In total, there are around 5,800 buses in operation as of 2024.

== History ==
=== Early history ===
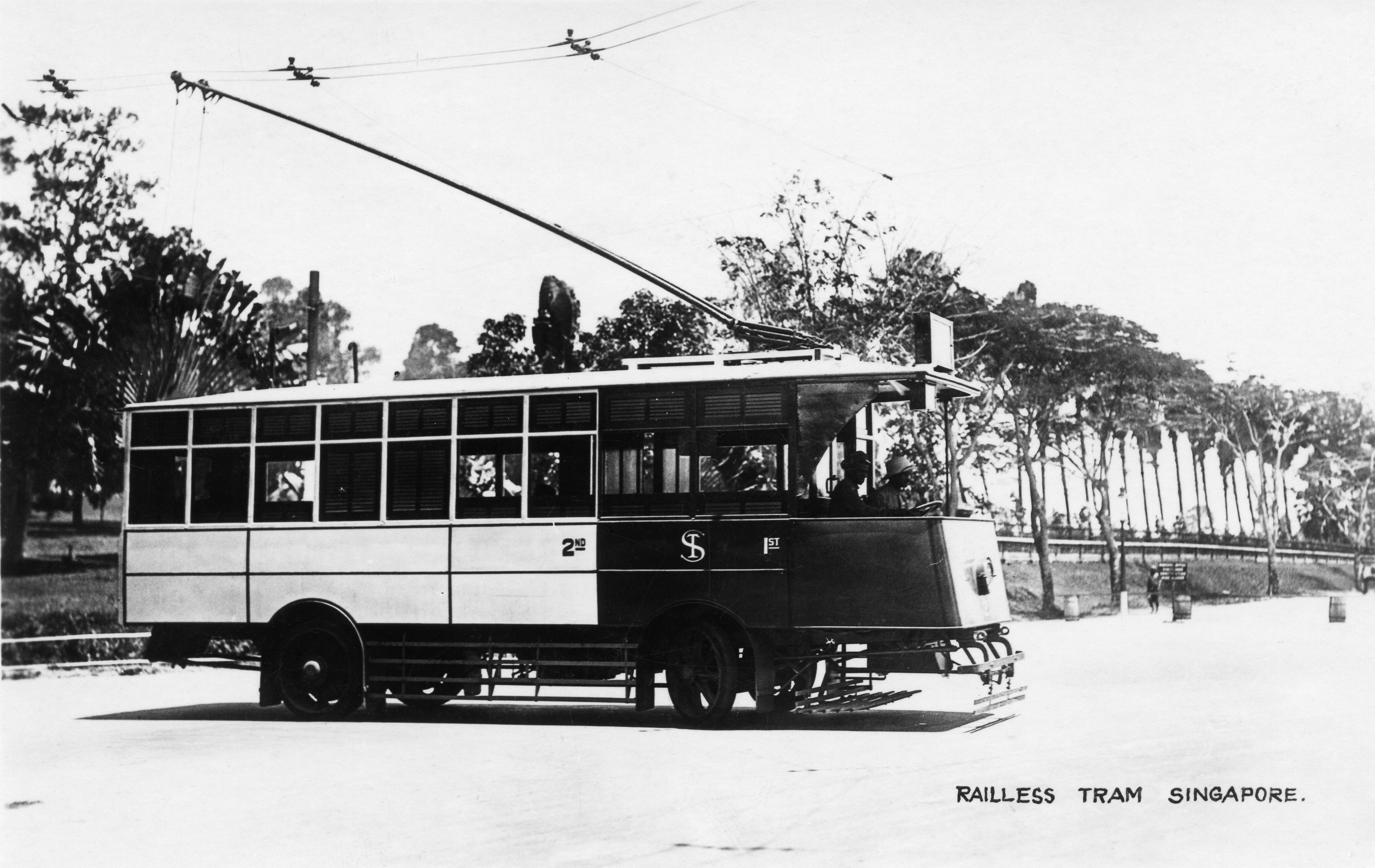
A trolleybus in 1930s Singapore

Buses were first introduced into Singapore when the Singapore Traction Company (STC) was established under the Singapore Traction Company Ordinance of 1925 to replace the ill-fated electric tramway with a trolleybus system. The first trolleybuses began operations on 14 August 1926 between Joo Chiat Road and Tanjong Pagar whereas trams were phased out by 1927, with 66 trolleybuses plying on six routes with a mileage of 15” by 30 September that year. The STC later phased in motorbuses in 1929 when seven Dennis G-type buses began plying between Geylang and Finlayson Green before being transferred to serve Seletar.

However, the STC faced heavy competition from “mosquito-buses”, a form of informal paratransit operated using privately owned modified Ford Model T vehicles. Reckless driving of such “mosquito-buses” led to the government imposing heavy regulation on them, including having to stop at fixed stops (1923) and speed limits (1927). By 1935, “mosquito-buses” were replaced with more formalised bus services with the former “mosquito-bus” owners establishing what came to be known as the Chinese bus companies; these Chinese-operated buses connected the rural parts of Singapore to the town as opposed to the inner town services of the STC.

During the Japanese Occupation during the Second World War, all bus operations were briefly unified under the Syonan-si den (昭南市電), fuel shortages then led to some buses being charcoal-powered.

=== 1950s-1960s: Post-war recovery and troubles ===
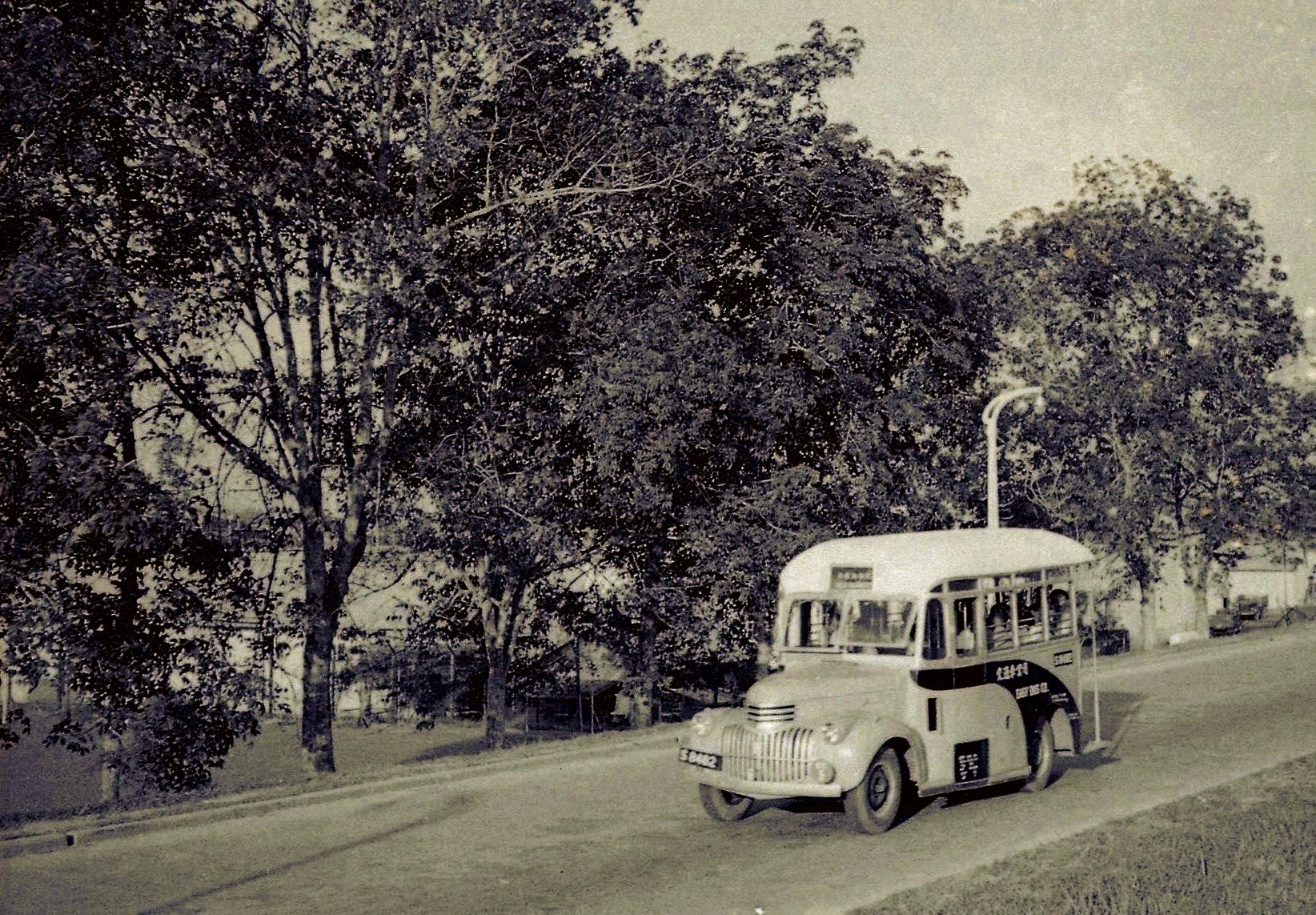
A Chinese-operated bus along Ayer Rajah Road in 1951

After the end of the war, the British Military Administration (BMA) was established to oversee the rebuilding of British institutions in its Malayan and Singapore colonies. Under the BMA, the STC slowly returned to normal operations with much of the dilapidated bus fleet replaced with newer motorbuses of the Albion make whereas the Chinese bus companies sought after numerous British makes such as Vulcan and Bedford. On the other hand, trolleybus operations were scaled down with only 50 new Ransomes, Sims & Jefferies-built trolleybuses procured as opposed the original 108 AEC-built trolleybuses from the pre-war period. Trolleybuses were eventually phased out by 1962 and were replaced by new Isuzu-built motorbuses.

Unfortunately the 1950s boded bad times for both the STC and the Chinese bus companies. General discontent on the poor working conditions, coupled with a highly politicised environment in the 1950s, led to many of their workers joining labour unions such as the STC Employee's Union and the Singapore Bus Workers’ Union (SBWU). Labour unrest led to transport paralysis, with two notorious incidents being the Hock Lee bus riots in 1955 (that year alone saw 57 strikes) and a 146-day-long Great STC Strike in 1956, the latter which further accelerated the decline of the STC when Chinese bus companies established their presence in the inner city with replacement bus services. Illegal “pirate taxis” also flourished during this time, offering a form of relief for stranded commuters although they were also notorious for unsafe driving practices and cost the bus companies and legitimate taxi drivers much losses.

The severity of the situation demanded immediate action from the government; in 1956 five Commissioners led by Mr L.C. Hawkins of the London Transport Executive published a report that recommended nationalisation of public transport but little was followed up by the government then.

=== 1970s: Bus reorganization and mergers ===
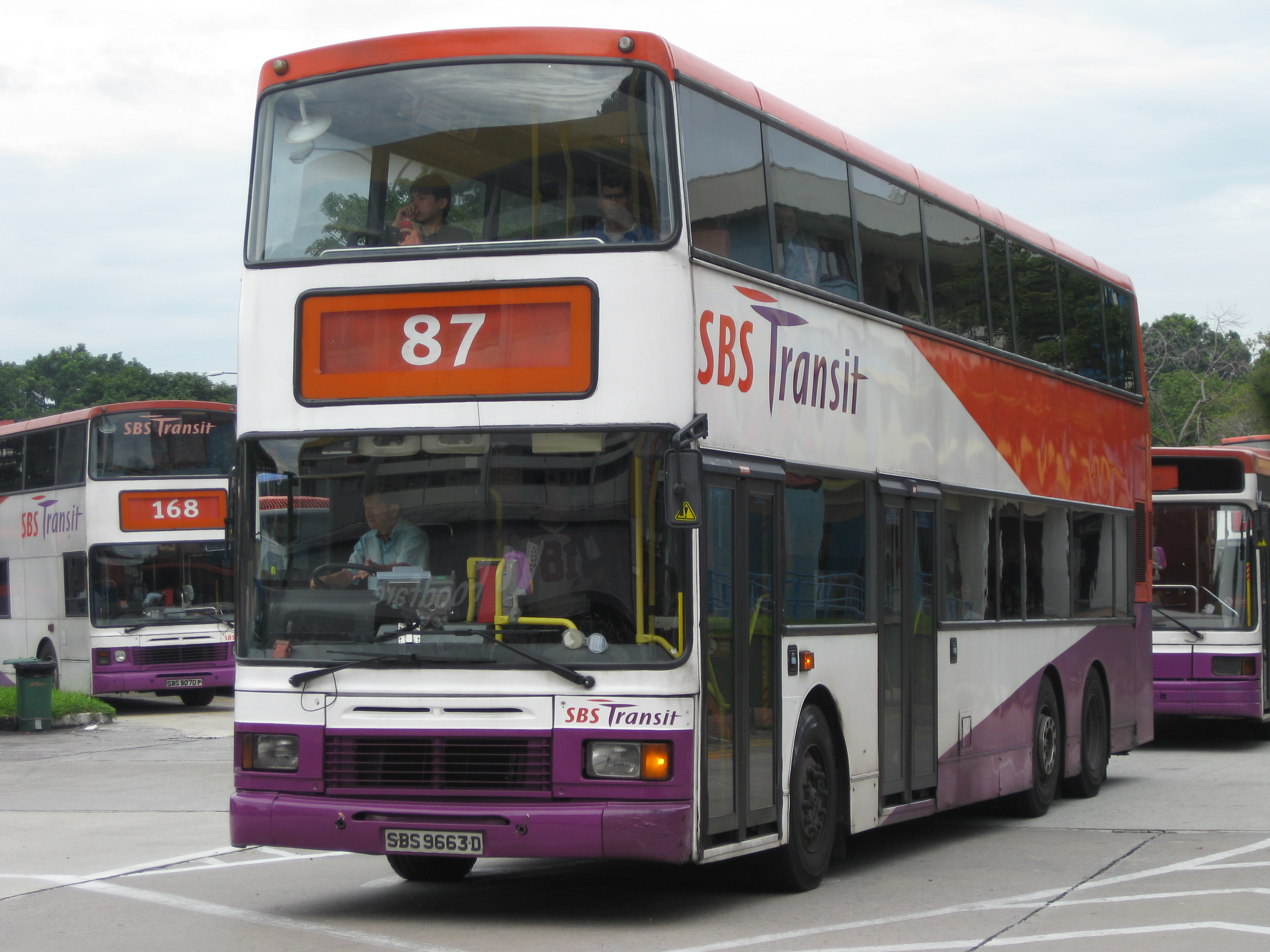
SBS began operating double-decker buses in 1977; by 2004 its successor SBS Transit was operating more than 700 of such buses, one of which was this Volvo Olympian

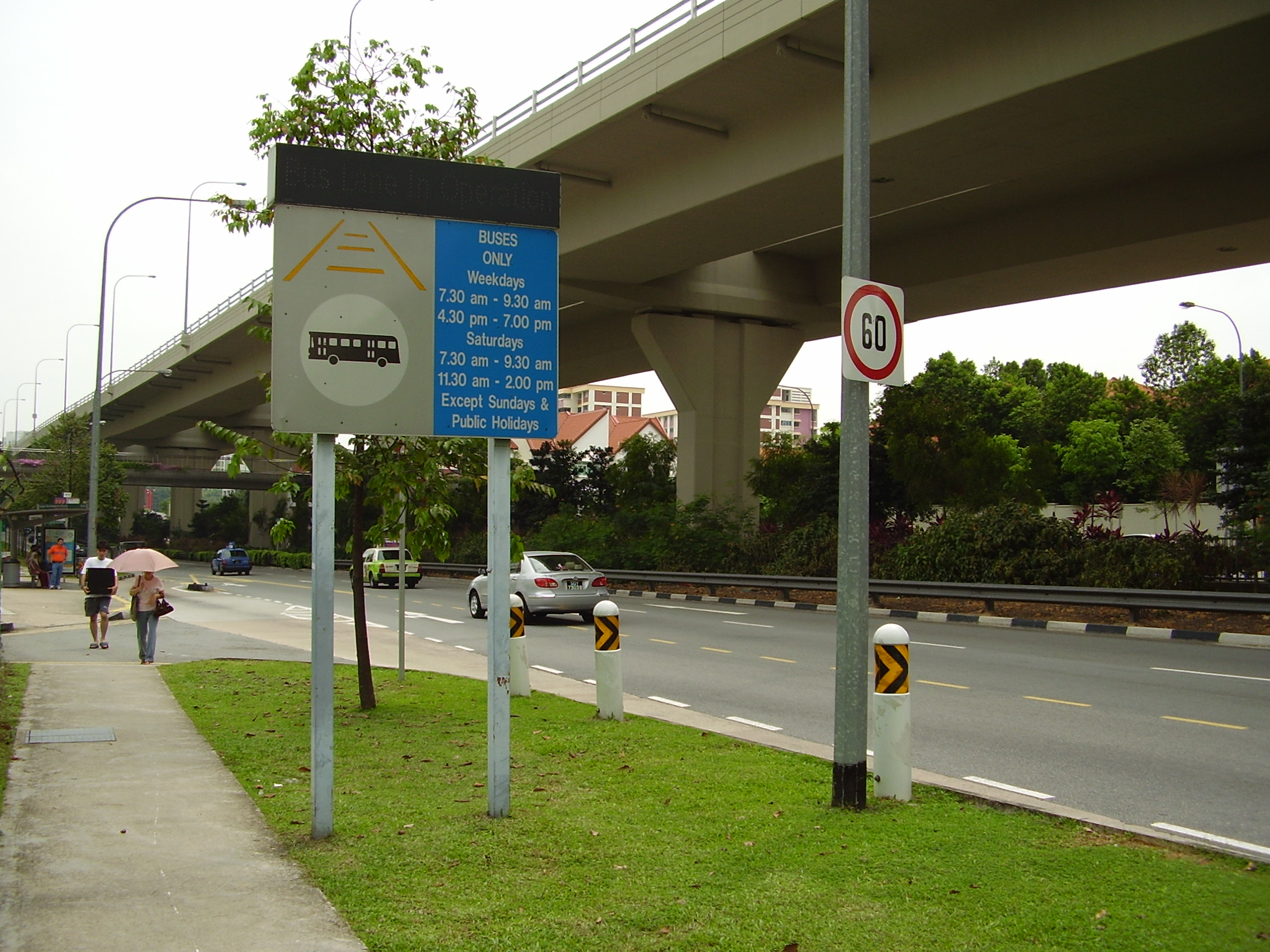
Bus lanes were implemented in 1974 to speed up bus services

Five years after the independence of Singapore from Malaysia in 1965, the government published a White Paper to study into an overhaul on bus services; this was followed by the Wilson Report published by Australian transport consultant R.P. Wilson, who not only reaffirmed the need for rationalisation of bus transport but also provided detailed recommendations on bus routes, frequencies, fares, vehicle specifications, bus stop and terminal design and maintenance standards.

In April 1971, the 10 Chinese bus companies were merged to form three larger regional bus companies, namely Amalgamated Bus Company in the west, Associated Bus Services in the east, and United Bus Company in the north. The STC retained its presence in central Singapore but lost its privileges previously granted by the 1925 STC Ordinance. Unable to cope with existing financial difficulties and competition from the regional companies, the STC eventually discontinued bus operations in 1971, with its remaining bus fleet being split up between the three regional companies. Service quality did not make great improvement however, with breakdowns and complaints from passengers being very common. Eventually in 1973, the Singapore government persuaded the three regional companies to merge to form a single entity called Singapore Bus Services (SBS).

SBS inherited many problems from its Chinese predecessors, including use of 14 non-standard bus models that frequently broke down, poor standards among the staff and inadequate infrastructure. Hence, the government seconded a Government Team of Officials to SBS in 1974 to overhaul the management and culture. Under the supervision of the GTO, SBS completely overhauled their bus fleet with new buses of usually the Albion Viking or Mercedes-Benz OF1413 makes and introduced a rigorous maintenance regime, improving the reliability of their buses greatly whereas a new disciplinary code was introduced, reducing complaints by half from 1979 to 1983. The government also helped to further alleviate the burden from SBS by introducing priority bus lanes to speed up bus services and introduced Scheme B bus services operated by private companies in 1974.

In 1977, SBS introduced into service its first double-decker buses, the Leyland Atlantean AN68 on route 86 between Tampines Way and Shenton Way.

In light of dissatisfaction over bus services in the Jurong area and requests for improved coverage, SBS started a reorganisation of bus services across the country, starting with Jurong. This consisted of a network of internal services serving a town, with external services terminating at a point in the town, along with bus interchanges to serve as such termini. Additional depots were also constructed, which SBS claimed gave them more control over bus operations.

In 1975, one-man operation (OMO) that charged a flat fare (for the case of SBS; TIBS opted for a distance fare) was introduced to cut manpower costs; this was followed by a one-man operated ticketing operation (OTS) in 1982. By 1984, bus conductors were completely phased out.

By 1978, SBS was in a healthy position to be publicly listed on the Singapore Stock Exchange as SBS (1978) Limited.

=== 1980s-1990s: Market competition ===
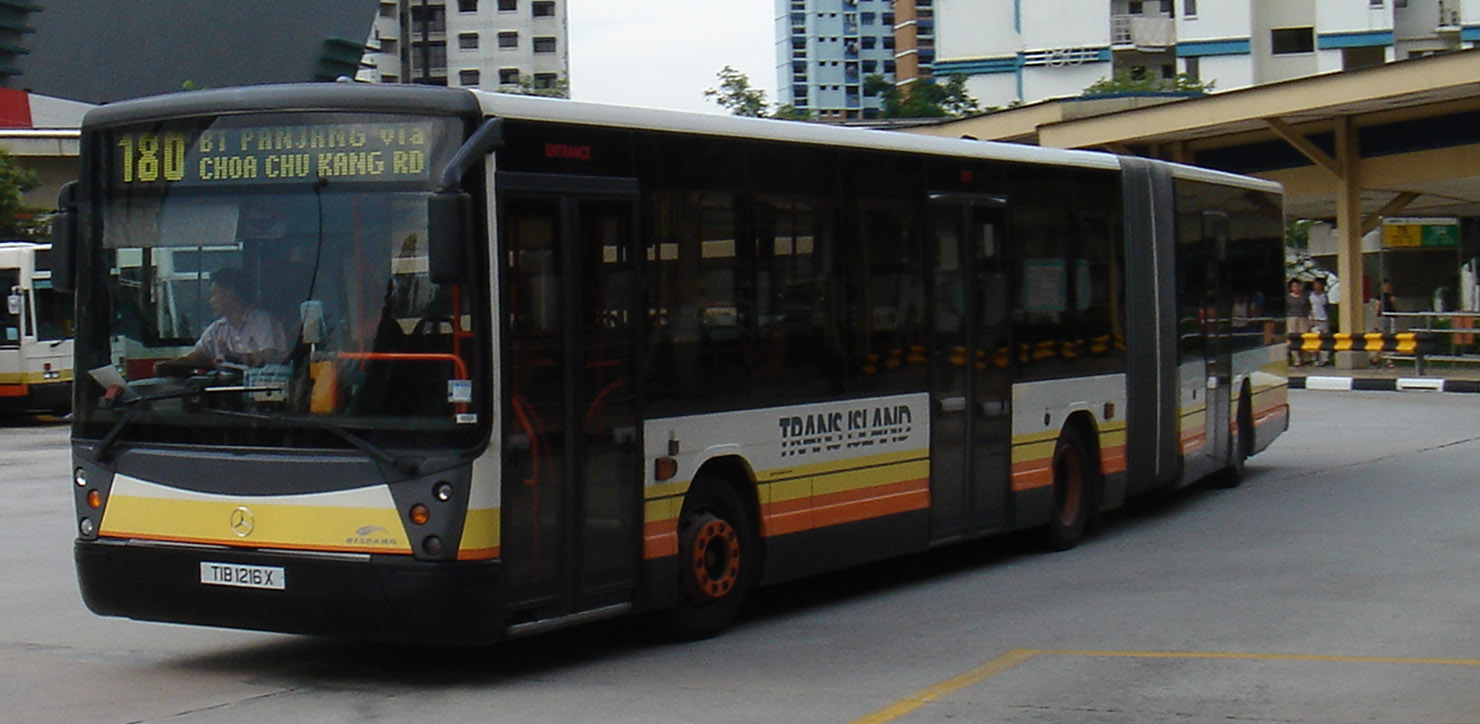
While SBS opted for double-decker buses, TIBS went for articulated buses instead. This is a Hispano Carrocera-bodied Mercedes-Benz O405G

By the 1980s, SBS had managed to modernise its fleet with new buses such as the Volvo B57, Mercedes-Benz OF1417 and the Leyland Atlantean AN68. By 1982 however, there was concerns that SBS might turn complacent. To ensure that SBS remain competitive, the government gave Ng Ser Miang of Singapore Shuttle Bus (SSB, one of the two operators of City Shuttle Service) the green light to set up a second operator. Named as Trans-Island Bus Service (TIBS), TIBS started operations the following year with a modest fleet of 90 Hino buses on routes 160 and 167. By 1988, the company had expanded its operations to encompass Woodlands and Yishun and operated 328 buses on 214 routes and had taken over SSB.

In 1984, SBS trialled its first air-conditioned buses, the Mercedes-Benz OF1413/61, on route 168. Following various trials of different air-conditioned demonstrators, SBS made its first bulk order for air-conditioned buses in 1989, the Scania N113CRB. When the Mass Rapid Transit (MRT) opened in 1987, bus services were further rationalised such that buses complemented the MRT by “feeding” commuters into the MRT network. Fares for both buses and the MRT were also coordinated together from 1987 with the setting of the Public Transport Council that year whereas magnetic stored value cards were implemented across the entire bus network to streamline fare payment earlier in 1986.

In 1993, SBS introduced into service its first air-conditioned 12m double decker bus, the Leyland Olympian 3-axle. With a capacity of 131, its size earned it the nickname “Superbus”. Three years later, TIBS phased in Singapore's first bendy buses with a length of 17.5 metre and a capacity of 150.

=== Late 1990s-2000s: Bus operators go multimodal ===
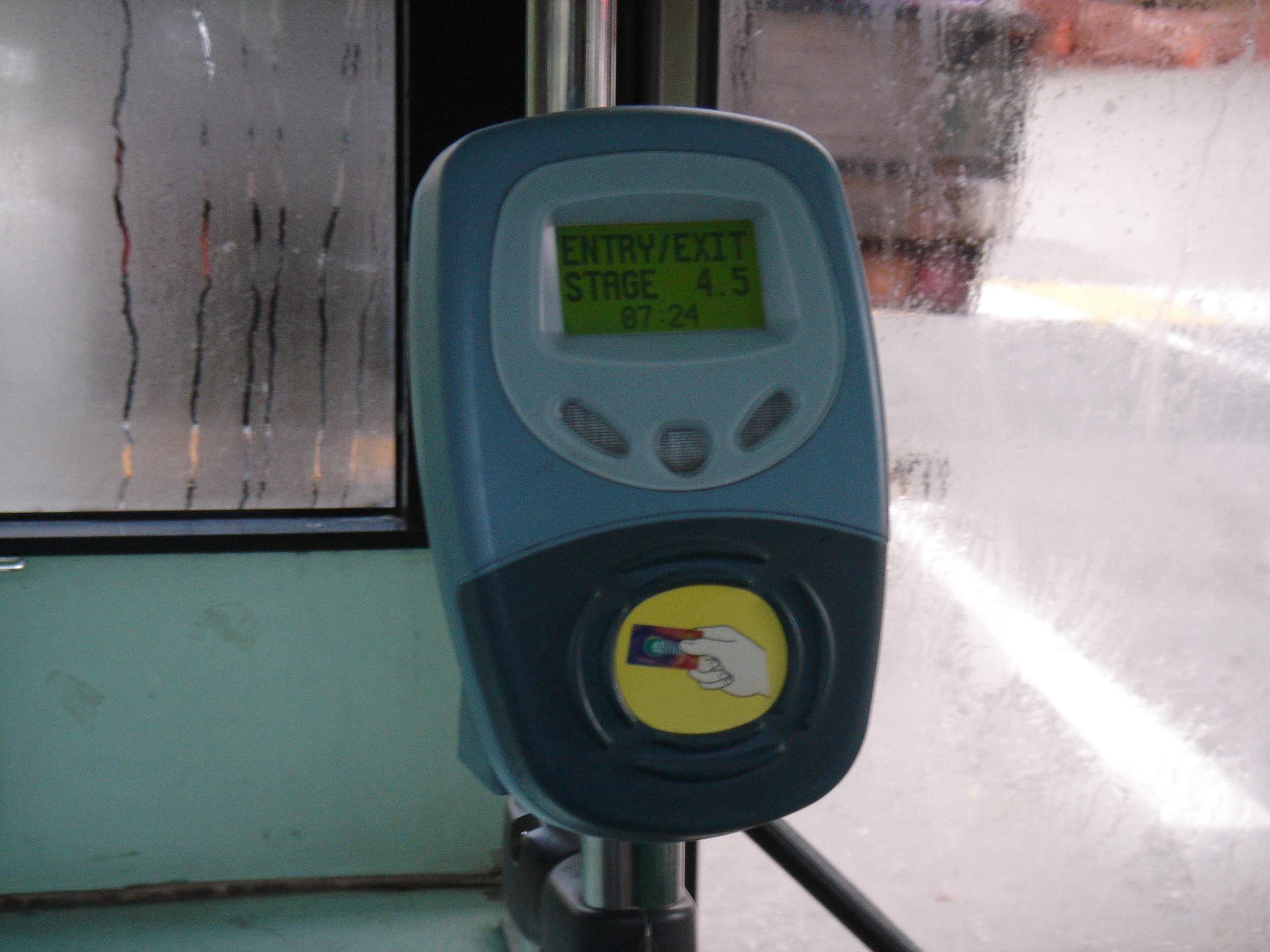
An older EZ-Link card reader on board an SMRT bus. EZ-Link contactless smart cards were first introduced in 2002

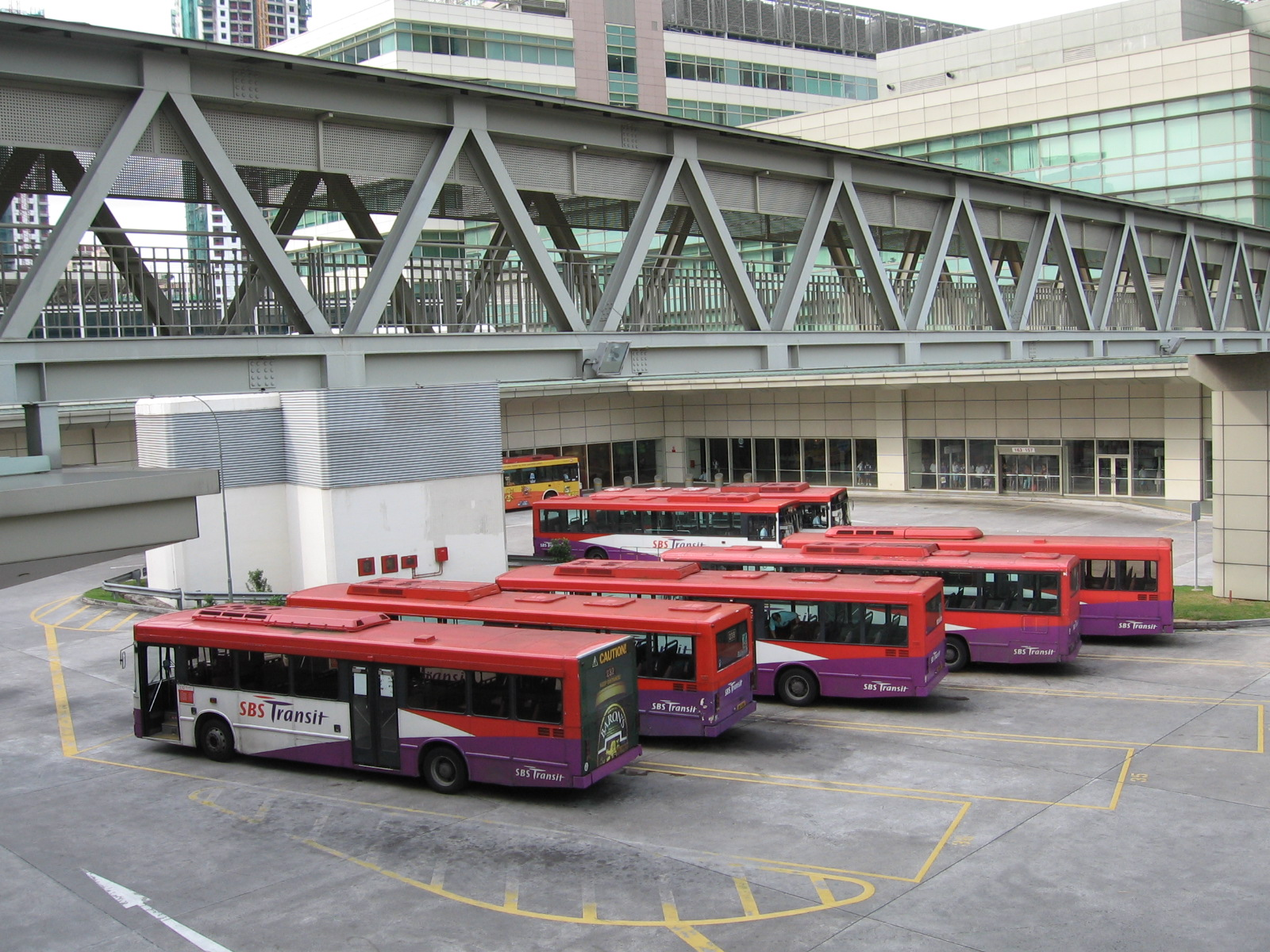
Toa Payoh Bus Interchange was the first air-conditioned bus interchange in Singapore when it opened in 2002

By 1996, SBS had expanded far beyond public bus operations to include tourist transport (SBS Leisure), taxis (Citycab) and engineering works (SBS Engineering) to name a few. To better manage its business, SBS (1978) Limited was rebranded as DelGro Corporation while public bus services were now managed by a new subsidiary named SBS. This new company also won a tender in 1999 to operate the North East MRT line and the LRT systems in Sengkang and Punggol and was rebranded as SBS Transit in 2001 to reflect its multimodal nature. By 2003, Delgro Corporation merged with Comfort Group to form ComfortDelGro, one of the largest land transport operators in the world whose operations include Metroline in London and ComfortDelGro Australia. In 2001, TIBS was merged into SMRT Corporation and by 2004, the TIBS name was dropped by SMRT, with TIBS now being known as SMRT Buses.

During this period, there were also numerous changes outside corporate shakeups; in 1995, some bus services in Bukit Panjang, Sengkang and Punggol were transferred to TIBS from SBS but this was reversed in 1999 when SBS won the contract to operate the North East MRT line. In return, bus services in Choa Chu Kang and Bukit Batok were transferred to TIBS that year. In 2002, the contactless EZ-Link card was introduced to replace the magnetic farecard and the first air-conditioned bus interchange opened in Toa Payoh; by the end of 2025, there were 15 air-conditioned integrated transport hubs.

In 2006, SBS Transit introduced into service is the first wheelchair accessible bus, the Volvo B9TL, on bus 21 between Pasir Ris and Saint Michael's. SSB wound up in 2007 with the discontinuation of the City Shuttle Service and its fleet was inherited by SMRT Buses. By 2009, both SBS Transit and SMRT Buses were renewing their respective bus fleets with new low-entry configuration Scania K230 urban buses and Mercedes-Benz OC500LE buses as respectively.

LTA took on the role of central bus network planner from 2009, working with communities and the bus operators, SBS Transit and SMRT Buses, to identify areas for bus improvements and to shift the focus to placing the commuter at the centre and taking a holistic approach in planning the bus network, taking into consideration development in the Rapid Transit System (RTS) network and other transport infrastructure. It is meant for their feedbacks, and any changes will be under the monthly updates, this has been brought through Bus Service Enhancement Programme. Under BSEP, about 80 new bus services are being introduced and 1,000 buses are being added over five years.

Quality of service standards have also been tightened to reduce waiting time and reduce crowding. Now, those with increased loads run every 10 minutes or less during weekday peak hours in 2015. Feeder bus services have become more frequent too, with 95% of bus services now running at intervals of 10 minutes or less during the weekday peak periods, tightened from 85%.

It was also in the 21st century when the public bus operators looked into alternative fuel sources. In 2002, SBS purchased 12 compressed natural gas-powered Volvo B10BLE buses whereas the first hybrid buses and hydrogen fuel cell buses were introduction in 2010. 2 CNG B10BLE units were deployed on Jurong Island Bus Services in 2006.

=== 2010s: Government leans in ===
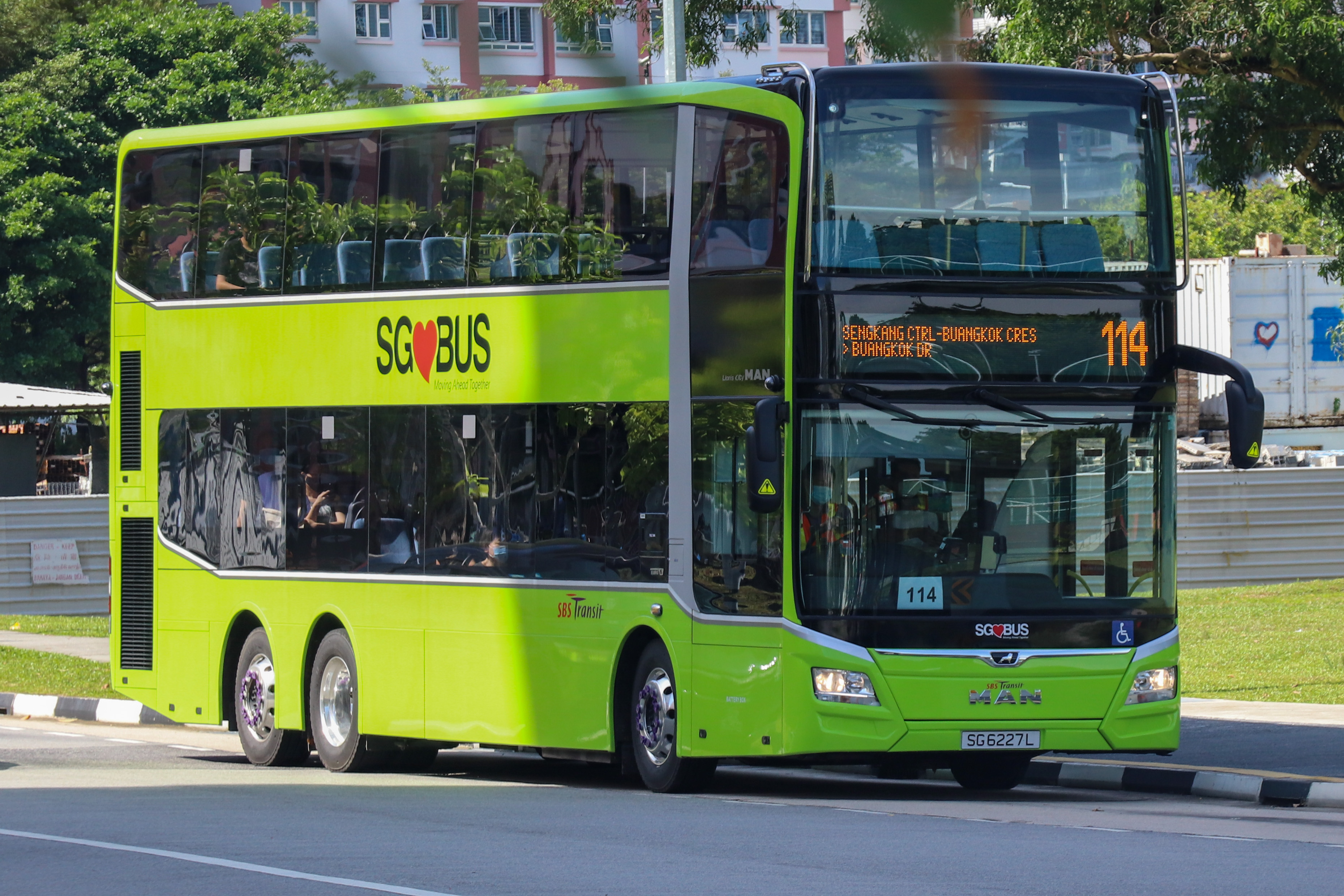
Under the new Bus Contracting Model, all new government owned public buses are to be painted in a unified lush green livery

Since the early years of independence, the government has maintained its stance that heavy car usage is not sustainable for Singapore in the long term with a mixed-use of policies to both deter car usage and to push its people to take public transport. In December 2011, the North–South MRT line suffered its first major breakdowns with 127,000 passengers affected in the worst of them.

Amid growing criticism of the existing operating model and growing strain on the bus system, the main public transport statutory board Land Transport Authority (LTA) launched the Bus Service Enhancement Programme (BSEP) in 2012, with 80 new and extended bus routes and 1,000 government-funded buses, involving Volvo B9TL (Wright Eclipse Gemini 2), Mercedes-Benz Citaro, Alexander Dennis Enviro500 MMC and MAN A22 buses. introduced over a period of five years. In 2013, the last non-air-conditioned public bus, the Volvo Olympian 2-axle, was phased out of service whereas SMRT Buses introduced its first wheelchair-accessible bendy bus, the MAN A24 and in the following year, its the first-ever double-decker bus, the MAN ND323F A95 or Alexander Dennis Enviro500 MMC.

In 2014, LTA announced that it would replace the existing operating model with the Bus Contracting Model (BCM) from 2016 onwards. Modelled after the Transperth model with elements of the competitive tendering model from London Buses, LTA would own all bus assets and lease them out in regional packages to different bus operators for five years. The first bus package, the Bulim Bus Package, was awarded to Anglo-Australian company Tower Transit whereas Loyang was awarded to Go-Ahead. Both companies began their operations in 2016. The entire public bus system was fully transitioned into the BCM by September 2016 with SBS Transit and SMRT signing agreements with LTA to operate the remaining packages up to 2021 to 2026 after which they would be gradually opened up to competitive tendering.

With the BCM, bus operators introduced new buses with new features; in 2016 the first fully electric bus since the withdrawal of trolleybuses, the BYD K9, was operated by Go-Ahead Singapore whereas the first buses with USB charging ports commenced service with SMRT that year. In 2017, two three-door buses — a double-deck MAN A95 and a single decker MAN A22 were trialled by Tower Transit and SMRT Buses respectively. New Volvo B5L hybrid buses were also purchased from Volvo in 2017.

In April 2019, SimplyGo, a new payment scheme that allows direct fare payment from bank cards, was introduced. Stroller restraint systems were also retrofitted on all wheelchair-accessible buses since July 2019. In addition, LTA also experimented with assistive technology for commuters with special needs on routes 139 and 141 from January to July 2019.

=== 2020s ===
On 1 December 2020, all public buses in Singapore became fully wheelchair-accessible with the retirement of Mercedes-Benz O405G buses. The Volvo Super Olympian (CDGE) SBS9889U and Volvo B9TL (CDGE), both sharing the same manufacturing and product, retired gradually between November 2020 and September 2023, without lifespan extension to allow a greener planet with last better-quality diesel buses.

In April 2023, LTA launched a tender for 400 electric buses. The tender was won by BYD and Zhongtong, for 240 and 120 buses each. An option for 60 more buses was exercised and awarded to BYD Auto on 23 October 2024, and the new buses entered service from December.

Service	Changes	Result
128	Discontinued on 2 June 2020.	Low ridership since 1 August 2016.
171	Shortened to Bukit Panjang instead of Marina Centre on 31 August 2020.	Downtown Line Stage 2 duplication
700/700A	Discontinued on 31 August 2020 and merged to service 972M.	
971E	Renumbered to service 971 on 31 August 2020.	
167e	Discontinued on 14 December 2020.	Low ridership.
963R, NR1, NR2	Discontinued on 3 October 2021.	10.30pm curfew in all places (NR1 & NR2) removed demand, discouraging public gambling and expensive leisure. It was retired at the end of the Sembawang-Yishun Bus Package under SMRT Buses.
22	Shortened to Eunos instead of Tampines on 10 December 2021.	Downtown Line Stage 3 duplication.
65	Amended via Tampines Avenue 4 instead of Tampines Avenue 5 and Tampines Avenue 1 on 10 December 2021.	Downtown Line Stage 3 duplication.
66	Shortened to Beauty World instead of Bedok on 10 December 2021.	Downtown Line Stage 3 duplication.
506	Shortened to Serangoon instead of Upper East Coast on 10 December 2021.	Downtown Line Stage 3 duplication.
CT18	Discontinued on 10 December 2021.	Downtown Line Stage 3 duplication.
74e, 151e	Discontinued on 17 January 2022.	
971	Discontinued on 1 April 2022.	Downtown Line Stage 2 duplication.
401	Resumed on 4 June 2022.	
926	Discontinued on 30 June 2022.	Successful launch of Mandai-Khatib Shuttle as a result on 10 March 2017.
CT8	Discontinued on 30 June 2022.	Thomson-East Coast Line (opening on 13 November 2022) duplication and decentralisation of Chinatown as a result.
188R, NR3, NR5, NR6, NR8, 1N, 2N, 3N, 4N, 5N & 6N	Discontinued on 30 June 2022.	10.30pm curfew in all places (NR1 & NR2) removed demand, discouraging public gambling and expensive leisure. Those remaining routes are still within the negotiated bus packages awaiting tender.

==== Installation of protective screens ====
Since 2016, protective screens were installed to protect bus drivers from potential abuse by passengers. This was expanded during the COVID-19 pandemic to protect bus captains from the virus as well.

==== Autonomous buses ====
In 2024, LTA announced that it was considering to trial autonomous minibuses on public bus routes. LTA launched a request for proposals in January 2025, with six buses to be deployed from 2026 onwards on buses 191 and 400.

==== Bus Connectivity Enhancement Programme ====
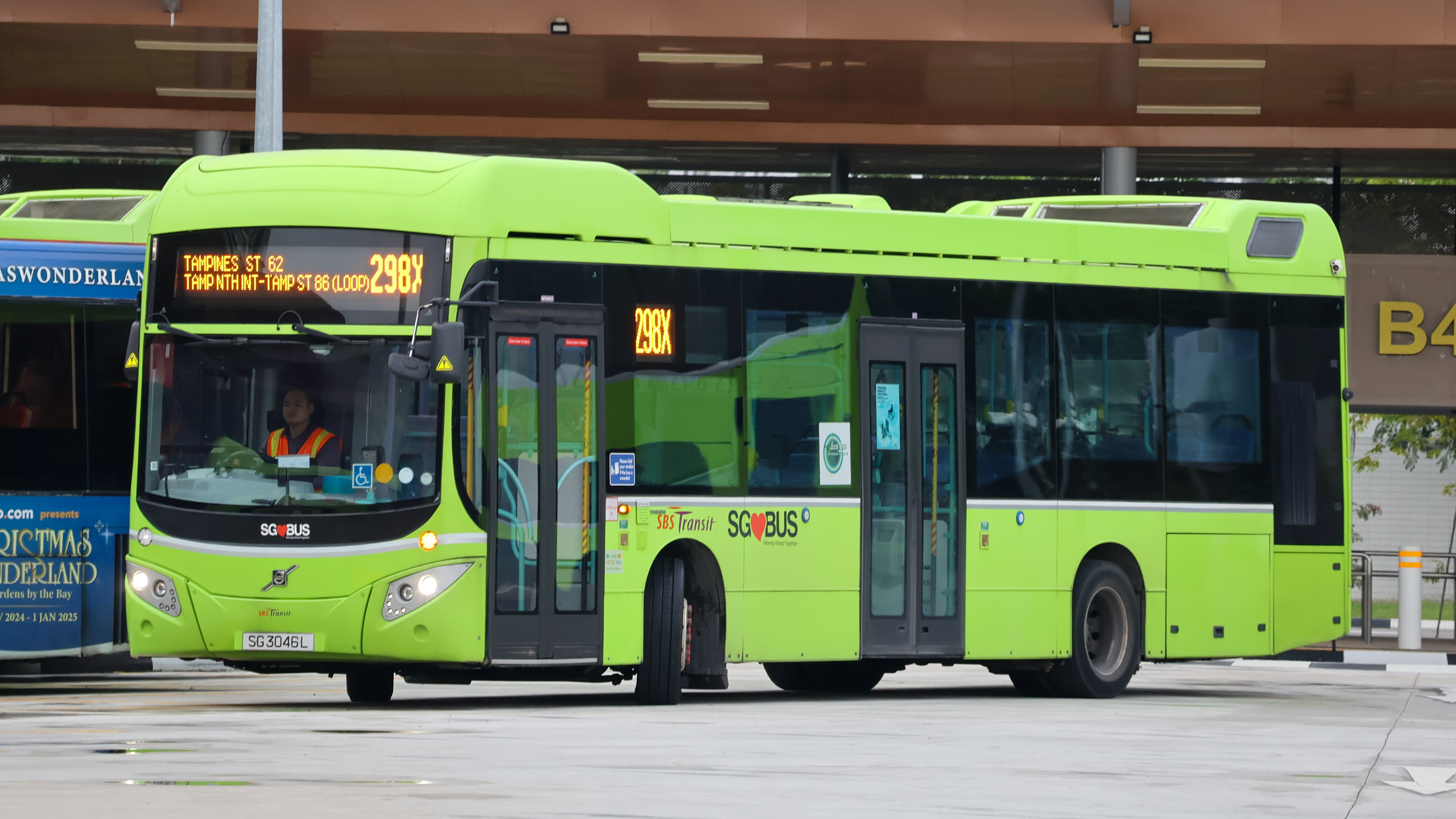
Bus services introduced under the BCEP include express feeder services. Service 298X was the first express feeder to be introduced.

In July 2024, LTA announced the launch of the Bus Connectivity Enhancement Programme (BCEP), in which they would spend nearly $900 million over a period of eight years to improve the connectivity of public buses in Singapore. These improvements would include purchasing more buses, introducing new bus services and increasing the frequency of existing ones, recruiting more staff and building new transport infrastructure.

The main initiatives under the BCEP include:

- Bus Service Improvements: In response to changing travel patterns and bus service rationalisation in view of the expanded rail network, bus services will be improved through introduction of new bus services, route amendments or improved frequencies. This includes:
  - Bus 230 extension to Caldecott (From February 2025)
  - Bus 292 amendment via Tampines Lane and Tampines Street 11 (From May 2025)
  - Bus 34 extension to Punggol Coast (From June 2025)
  - Bus 117 extension to Punggol Coast (From June 2025)
  - Bus 114 extension to Yio Chu Kang (From December 2025)
  - Bus 146 extension to Kovan (From December 2025)
  - Bus 97 extension to Tengah (From March 2026)
  - Bus 181 extension to Tengah (From June 2026)
- Peak-Hour Express Bus Services: More peak hour express bus services will be introduced. 11 new "City-Direct" services have been introduced under this scheme, this first of which was bus 673 in Oct 2024.
  - 673: Punggol - Suntec City / Shenton Way (October 2024)
  - 674: Tengah - Marina Bay (November 2024)
  - 676: Upper Serangoon View - Orchard Road (January 2025)
  - 678: Punggol North - Suntec City / Shenton Way (January 2025)
  - 679: Sengkang West - Suntec City / Shenton Way (December 2025)
  - 680: Montfort School - Novena / Orchard Road / Dhoby Ghaut (December 2025)
  - 681: Serangoon - Nicoll Highway / City Hall / Dhoby Ghaut / Orchard Road (December 2025)
  - 682: Compassvale - Novena / Orchard Road / Dhoby Ghaut (December 2025)
  - 683: Punggol - Nicoll Highway / City Hall / Dhoby Ghaut / Orchard Road (December 2025)
  - 684: Brickland / Bukit Batok West - Marina Bay (June 2026)
- New bus services in new estates: With growing demand in residential estates, the introduction of new bus services will be sped up to serve residents' needs better.
  - 861: Yishun (September 2024)
  - 967: Woodlands (January 2025)
  - 148: Bidadari (April 2025)
  - 299: Tampines (April 2025)
  - 230M: Toa Payoh (June 2025)
  - 872: Tengah (August 2025)
  - 104: Punggol (October 2025)
  - 984: Choa Chu Kang / Bukit Panjang (October 2025)
  - 44: Punggol (November 2025)
  - 18M: Bedok (February 2026)
  - 831G/831W: Tengah (March 2026)

=== Express Peak Hour (Limited-stop Peak Period Services) ===
Introduced under the Bus Connectivity Enhancement Programme (BCEP) starting from late 2024, these services reduce commuter travel times from edge towns to major transport nodes by skipping lower-demand intermediate bus stops, operating during weekday peak hours.

Limited-stop Peak Period Services (45X/46X Series)
Route	Routing	Previous number	Introduced
451	Keat Hong Link – Bukit Gombak MRT Station (Brickland)	991C	17 November 2025
452	Tengah – Beauty World (Tengah)	871X	17 November 2025
453	Tengah – Bukit Batok (Tengah)	992X	17 November 2025
454	Tampines North – Tampines Street 86 (Tampines)	298X	9 December 2024
455	Bukit Panjang – Yew Tee (Yew Tee)	979X	24 March 2025
456	St Michael's – Novena (Whampoa)	21X	28 April 2025
457	Hougang – Tai Seng MRT		23 March 2026
458	Sengkang – Tai Seng MRT		23 March 2026
459	Punggol – Tai Seng MRT		27 April 2026
460	Tampines Boulevard – Tampines MRT	296X	27 April 2026
461	Yishun East – Khatib MRT	861X	27 July 2026

In November 2025, Bus Service 44 was introduced under the BCEP, connecting Punggol Coast to Changi Airport. Operating exclusively during weekday peak hours, the service runs non-stop between Punggol and the airport via Pasir Ris Industrial Drive 1, Halus Link, the Tampines Expressway (TPE), and the Pan-Island Expressway (PIE) to cater primarily to airport employees and peak commuters. Unlike the 45X series, it is classified as a standard peak-period trunk service rather than an express feeder.

Introduced in early 2026, Bus Services 457, 458, and 459 function as limited-stop peak period services under the Bus Connectivity Enhancement Programme (BCEP). These routes directly connect the residential towns of Hougang, Sengkang, and Punggol to the Tai Seng industrial estate, offering alternative transit paths to alleviate passenger demand on the North East Line.

== Vehicles ==
Singapore's buses consist of single deck and double deck buses and they are operated by all four operators, SBS Transit, SMRT Buses, Tower Transit Singapore and Go-Ahead Singapore. Articulated buses are operated by SMRT Buses, with several units being transferred to SBS Transit and Tower Transit Singapore as part of the Seletar and Sembawang-Yishun Bus Packages respectively under the Bus Contracting Model (BCM).

Single deck and articulated buses
Bus Model	Operators	Units acquired	Year of introduction	Notes	Ref.
BYD BC12A04	SBS Transit, Tower Transit Singapore, Go-Ahead Singapore & SMRT Buses	300	2024	To replace Scania K230UB and Mercedes-Benz OC500LE.	
BYD C6	Tower Transit Singapore	4	2019	Only deployed on Service 825	
BYD K9	SBS Transit	20	2020		
Linkker LM312	SBS Transit, SMRT Buses	20	2021		
MAN A22	SBS Transit, SMRT Buses, Tower Transit Singapore & Go-Ahead Singapore	734 (Euro V), 150 (Euro VI)	2010 (Euro V) 2018 (Euro VI)		
MAN A24	SBS Transit, SMRT Buses, Tower Transit Singapore	40	2013	Sole model of articulated buses in Singapore since 2021.	
Mercedes-Benz Citaro	SBS Transit, SMRT Buses, Tower Transit Singapore & Go-Ahead Singapore	1,155	2010	51 units were built to SMRT specifications, while the remaining 1,104 units were built to SBS Transit specifications	
Mercedes-Benz OC500LE	SMRT Buses, Tower Transit Singapore	134	2008	The first Euro V buses in Southeast Asia.	
Scania K230UB	SBS Transit, Go-Ahead Singapore	501 (Euro IV), 600 (Euro V)	2007		
Volvo B5LH	Go-Ahead Singapore, SMRT Buses, Tower Transit Singapore	50	2018		
Yutong E12	Go-Ahead Singapore, SMRT Buses, Tower Transit Singapore	10	2020		
Zhongtong N12	SBS Transit, Tower Transit Singapore, Go-Ahead Singapore & SMRT Buses	120	2025	To replace Scania K230UB and Mercedes-Benz OC500LE.	

Double deck buses
Bus Model	Operators	Units acquired	Year of introduction	Notes	Ref.
Alexander Dennis Enviro500 MMC	SMRT Buses, Tower Transit Singapore & Go-Ahead Singapore	216 (Euro V), 50 (Euro VI)	2014 (Euro V) 2021 (Euro VI)		
MAN A95	SBS Transit, SMRT Buses, Tower Transit Singapore & Go-Ahead Singapore	200 (Euro V), 412 (Euro VI)	2014 (Euro V) 2018 (Euro VI)		
Scania K310UD	SBS Transit	1	2010	Demonstrator Unit	
Volvo B9TL (Gemilang)	SBS Transit	1	2014	Demonstrator Unit	
Volvo B9TL (Wright Eclipse Gemini 2)	SBS Transit, SMRT Buses, Tower Transit Singapore & Go-Ahead Singapore	1,606	2010	Most common bus model in Singapore.	
Yutong E12DD	Go-Ahead Singapore, SMRT Buses, Tower Transit Singapore	10	2020		

== Routes ==
Singapore has many different bus services plying through the island. These bus routes are categorised accordingly:

- Trunk: Routes that ply between various towns. (e.g. 5, 12, 27, 100, 133, 162, 857, 960)
- Feeder: Services that operate within a single town (e.g. 243G, 334, 386, 410W, 382W, 382G, 807, 901M, 945) or in a dual-loop fashion (e.g. 222, 291, 293, 811, 912)
- Express Peak Hour: Peak-hour services that skips lower demand bus stops for quicker travels and charges basic bus fares (i.e. 451, 452, 453, 454, 455, 456, 457, 458)
- Short Trip: Routes that operate short haul trips of services which cover high demand sectors of the parent route. (e.g. 3A, 70B, 147A, 222A, 857A, 965A)
- Jurong Industrial Services: Routes that serve the Jurong and Tuas industrial areas, served by SMRT Buses under the Jurong West Bus Package. (e.g. 247, 249, 251, 258)
- Express: Routes that stop at selected stops and generally run on expressways or long stretches of express sector for faster travel between several towns. (e.g. 43e, 174e, 502/502A, 854e, 951E)
- City Direct: Service connecting passengers directly to and from the Central Business District during peak hours. Previously operated by private operators. (i.e. 651 to 678; 660M)
- Cross Border Services: Services that cross the Causeway or the Second Link into Malaysia. As the public will use passport or QR-code scanning; bus drivers will scan the bus pass for verification without the need of passports or QR code scanning, as the ICA will have their own database at the bus depot (e.g. Ulu Pandan and Woodlands Bus Depot), and Woodlands Temporary Bus Interchange is sterile area for bus drivers. (i.e. 160, 170, 170X, 950)
- Resorts World Sentosa Bus services: Bus services that operate in and out of Resorts World Sentosa. Services run on weekends and Public Holidays. (i.e. RWS8)

=== Bus packages ===
Under the Bus Contracting Model, bus services are grouped into bus packages, each of which is operated by a bus operator.

Package	Bus depot	Operator	Commencement date	End date (Note: Subject to a 2-year extension)	Total	Services
Tendered packages
Bulim	Bulim Bus Depot; Tengah Depot (from 2028)	Tower Transit Singapore	29 May 2021	2028	38	41, 49, 66, 77, 78, 79, 96, 97, 97e, 98/98M, 106, 143/143M, 173, 177, 183, 189, 282, 284, 285, 333, 334, 335, 452, 453, 651, 653, 657, 674, 831G/831W, 870, 871, 872, 941, 945, 947, 984, 990, 992
Loyang	Loyang Bus Depot; Lorong Halus Bus Depot (from 2031)	Go-Ahead Singapore	4 September 2016	2026	37	2, 3, 6, 12, 12e, 15, 17/17A, 34, 36, 43, 43e, 44, 62, 68, 82, 83, 84G/84W, 85, 104, 118, 119, 136, 354, 358, 359, 381, 382G/382W, 384, 386, 403, 459, 518/518A, 661, 666, 673, 678, 683
Seletar	Seletar Bus Depot	SBS Transit	16 March 2025	2030	29	24, 70/70M, 71, 76, 130, 133, 135, 138/138M, 162, 261, 262, 265, 268, 269, 650, 652, 668, 800, 803, 804, 805, 806, 807, 811, 812, 851, 851e, 852, 860
Bukit Merah	Ulu Pandan Bus Depot; Pasir Panjang Bus Depot (from 2029)	SBS Transit	28 April 2024	2029	18	5, 16/16M, 57, 93, 120, 121, 122, 123/123M, 131, 145, 160, 170/170X, 195, 198, 272, 273, 400, 993
Sembawang–Yishun	Mandai Depot; Simpang Bus Depot (from 2029)	Tower Transit Singapore	5 September 2021	2028	27	167, 169, 171, 461, 656, 663, 670, 801, 825, 853/853M, 854, 854e, 855, 856, 857, 858, 859/859A/859B, 861/861M, 882, 883/883M, 963, 963e, 965, 966, 969, 980, 981
Jurong West	Soon Lee Bus Depot	SMRT Buses	1 September 2024	2029	26	179/179A/179B, 181/181M, 182/182M, 185, 192, 193, 194, 199, 240/240M, 241, 242, 243G/243W, 246, 247, 248/248M, 249, 251, 252, 253, 254, 255, 257, 258/258M, 405, 502/502A, 974
Tampines	East Coast Integrated Depot	Go-Ahead Singapore	5 July 2026	2031	29	4, 10, 10e, 18, 19, 20, 23, 28, 29, 31, 37, 38, 39, 47, 65, 69, 72, 81, 127, 129, 291, 292, 293, 296, 298, 299, 454, 460, 646
Serangoon–Eunos	Kim Chuan Depot	SMRT Buses	13 June 2027	2032	26	11, 22, 53/53M, 55, 58, 59, 60, 63/63M, 64, 90, 94, 101, 103, 105, 109, 134, 137, 140, 141, 146, 148, 150, 154, 158, 315, 317
Negotiated packages
Serangoon–Eunos	Hougang Bus Depot (Until June 2027)	SBS Transit	1 September 2016	12 June 2027	26	11, 22, 53/53M, 55, 58, 59, 60, 63/63M, 64, 90, 94, 101, 103, 105, 109, 134, 137, 140, 141, 146, 148, 150, 154, 158, 315, 317
Sengkang–Hougang	Sengkang West Bus Depot	SBS Transit	1 September 2016	TBA	41	27, 51, 80, 86, 87, 89, 89e, 102, 107/107M, 112, 113, 114, 115, 116, 117/117M, 132, 151, 153, 159, 161, 163, 165, 324, 325, 329, 371, 372, 374, 457, 458, 654, 660/660M, 671, 672, 675, 676, 677, 679, 680, 681, 682
Bedok	Bedok North Bus Depot	SBS Transit	1 September 2016	TBA	22	9, 13, 14, 14e, 18M, 25, 30, 30e, 35/35M, 40, 42, 45, 46, 168, 196, 196e, 222, 225G/225W, 228, 229, 401, 506
Choa Chu Kang–Bukit Panjang	Gali Batu Depot	SMRT Buses	1 September 2016	TBA	31	61, 67, 75, 172, 176, 180, 184, 188, 188e, 190, 300, 301, 302, 307, 451, 455, 647, 649, 684, 920, 922, 927, 970, 972/972M, 973, 975, 976, 979, 983/983M, 985, 991
Woodlands	Woodlands Bus Depot (Until 2030)	SMRT Buses	1 September 2016	TBA	21	110, 178, 187, 648, 665, 900, 901/901M, 902, 903/903M, 904, 911, 912, 913/913M, 925/925M, 950, 960, 960e, 961/961M, 962, 964, 967
Clementi	Bukit Batok Bus Depot (Until 2030)	SBS Transit	1 September 2016	TBA	23	7, 32, 33, 48, 74, 91, 92, 95, 99, 100, 111, 147, 156, 166, 174, 174e, 175, 191, 197, 200, 201, 655, 667
Bishan–Toa Payoh	Hougang Bus Depot	SBS Transit	1 September 2016	TBA	23	8, 21, 26, 50, 52, 54, 56, 73, 88, 124, 125, 139, 142, 155, 157, 186, 230/230M, 231, 232, 235, 238, 410G/410W, 456

== See also ==
- Transport in Singapore
- Rail transport in Singapore
