= Bus contracting model of Singapore =

2016 government contract model

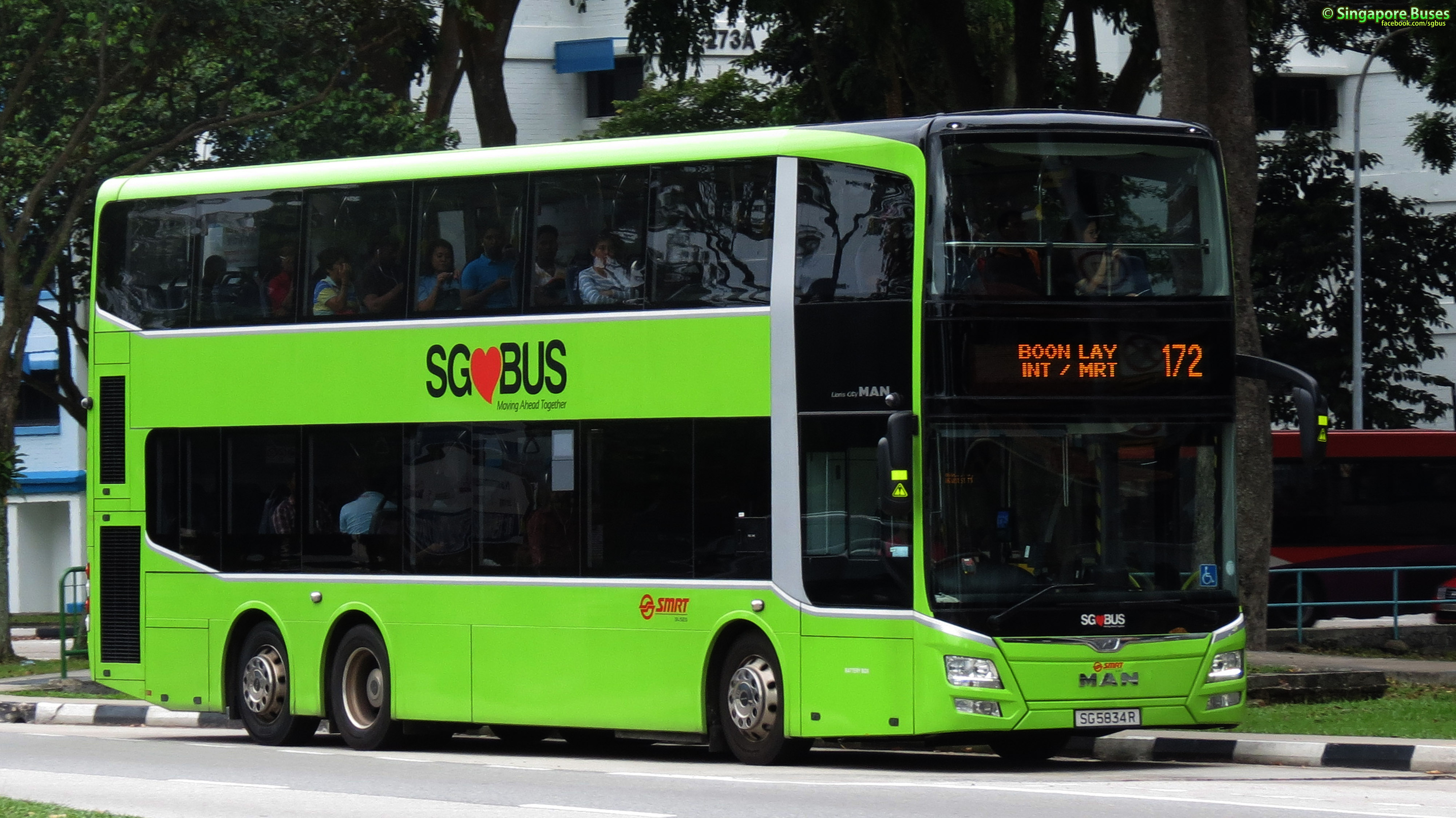
Buses under Singapore's bus contracting model bear the unified lush green livery.

Singapore's Bus Contracting Model (BCM), formerly known as the Government Contracting Model (GCM), is a public bus franchising and contracting model introduced by the Land Transport Authority (LTA) in 2014, and fully implemented in 2016. The BCM is based on the Transperth model in Perth, Western Australia, with quality incentive elements from London Buses. Under the BCM, local and overseas bus operators bid for contracts to operate public bus services on behalf of LTA. The LTA has also adopted a new unified lush green livery and logo for all buses, and now procures and owns the bus fleet for all public bus services in Singapore.

== History ==
First introduced in 2014, the Government of Singapore claimed that the new contracting model allows public bus services to be more responsive to changes in ridership and commuter needs and to encourage competition between bus operators, improving bus services for commuters.

With the Bus Service Operating Licenses (BSOL) of SBS Transit and SMRT Buses expiring on 31 August 2016, the Land Transport Authority (LTA) decided to revamp the country's bus operations into a competitive tendering process. Under the contracting model, bus operators bid for the right to operate services while with the LTA as central planner, setting service levels and service standards. The LTA retains ownership of bus, depot and fleet management system assets. Operators that win a tender for a bus package are paid a fixed fee to operate the services.

Under the bus industry model, the LTA claims that the commuters will benefit with lesser waiting time for buses. All bus services will run at intervals of not more than 15 minutes, and feeders will run at even shorter intervals at 6 to 8 minutes.

LTA issues new bus tenders only when introducing new depots to replace aging facilities or relieve congestion, as seen in Jurong West. Currently, LTA has six bus packages open for tender.

== Tendered bus packages ==
=== Bulim Bus Package ===
In October 2014, the LTA called for tenders to operate the Bulim Bus Package comprising 26 existing bus services originating from Bukit Batok, Jurong East and Clementi bus interchanges. Since then, services 653, 657 and 944 were added into this package under SMRT Buses on 13 April 2017, 24 April 2017 and 27 August 2017 respectively. In 2020, Service 651 was also added into this package.

Aedge Holdings, Busways, Go-Ahead Group, a Jiaoyun Group / Travel GSH joint venture, Jinan Public Transportation, Keolis, RATP Dev Transdev Asia, SBS Transit, SMRT Buses, Transit Systems and Woodlands Transport lodged bids. In May 2015, the LTA awarded the contract to Transit Systems with the new Bulim Bus Depot handed over to Tower Transit Singapore on 31 July 2015. The depot is able to accommodate about 550 buses.

In September 2020, the LTA awarded the contract for the second term of this package to Tower Transit Singapore. Operations under the second term commenced on 29 May 2021, which also involves the transfer of services 653, 657 and 944 from SMRT Buses to Tower Transit Singapore.

With the development of Tengah New Town, Route 944 was extended to Tengah Interchange and renumbered 992. Six new routes originating from Tengah itself, namely routes 870, 871, and 872, express feeder routes 452 and 453 and feeder Services 831G and 831W were also added to this bus package upon their introduction.

=== Loyang Bus Package ===
In April 2015, the LTA called for tenders to operate the Loyang Bus Package comprising 24 existing bus services originating from Changi Airport Bus Terminal, Changi Village Bus Terminal, Pasir Ris Bus Interchange and Punggol Temporary Bus Interchange. Later on, services 381 and 12e were introduced. On 1 April 2018, service 68 was added into this package. On 9 September 2019, service 43e was added into this package. On 27 December 2020, service 384 was added into this package.

Busways, Go-Ahead Group, Keolis, RATP Dev Transdev Asia, SBS Transit, SMRT Buses, a Tian Tan Shipping/Kumho Buslines joint venture and Woodlands Transport lodged bids. The contract was awarded in November 2015 to Go-Ahead Singapore. The 29 bus routes are based at the new Loyang Bus Depot which was completed in June 2015 and is able to accommodate about 505 buses.

In August 2020, Go-Ahead Singapore received a two-year contract extension to continue operating the bus package until September 2023. In September 2022, this was further extended until September 2026.

Service 104 was introduced and added to this package.

Express feeder service 459 were introduced and added to this package, it will be the first bus express feeder that operated by Go-Ahead Singapore on 27 April 2026.

=== Seletar Bus Package ===
In June 2016, the LTA called for tenders to operate 24 existing bus services originating from Yishun Bus Interchange, Yio Chu Kang Bus Interchange and Ang Mo Kio Bus Interchange, with 3 new bus services (71, 668 and 851e under SBS Transit as well as 652 and 807 initially under SMRT Buses) to be introduced. The 29 routes are based at the new Seletar Bus Depot which was completed in the 3rd quarter of 2017 and is able to accommodate about 515 buses including 20 lots for electric buses. The tender was closed on 27 October 2016 (with original deadline as 6 October 2016).

Busways, Go-Ahead Singapore, a Jiaoyun Group / Travel GSH joint venture, National Express, SBS Transit, Shenzhen Bus Group, SMRT Buses, a Tian Tan Shipping/Kumho Buslines joint venture, Tower Transit Singapore and Woodlands Transport lodged bids. In April 2017, the LTA awarded incumbent operator SBS Transit the package.

In 2022, SBS Transit received a two-year contract extension to continue operating the bus package until March 2025. They subsequently retained control of said package for the second term, edging out four other bidders, including Bravo Transport of Hong Kong, and SBS Transit will allow more bus services not from Seletar Bus Package to park in this bus depot, allowing the closure of Ang Mo Kio Bus Depot.

=== Bukit Merah Bus Package ===
In April 2017, the LTA called for tenders to operate 17 bus services originating from Bukit Merah Bus Interchange, HarbourFront Bus Interchange, Buona Vista Bus Terminal, Marina Centre Bus Terminal, Kampong Bahru Bus Terminal, Queen Street Bus Terminal and Shenton Way Bus Terminal. The 17 bus routes (including cross border services 160 and 170/170X) will be supported by the new Ulu Pandan Bus Depot which was completed in the first quarter of 2018 and is able to accommodate about 480 buses.

Go-Ahead Singapore, a Jiaoyun Group / Travel GSH joint venture, SBS Transit, Shenzhen Bus Group, SMRT Buses and Tower Transit Singapore lodged bids. In February 2018, the LTA awarded incumbent operator SBS Transit the package and allows more bus services not from Bukit Merah Bus Package to park in this bus depot, allowing the closure of Ayer Rajah Bus Park.

Tenders for the second term of the Bukit Merah bus package were called on 23 November 2022, along with the initial term of the Jurong West bus package. The tender closed on 3 April 2023. On 18 August 2023, it was announced that SBS Transit won the tender for the package and will continue operating the bus services in this package, similar arrangements from the previous tender are carried out.

=== Sembawang–Yishun Bus Package ===
In November 2019, the LTA called for tenders to operate the Sembawang–Yishun bus package, which was held concurrently with the tender for the second term of Bulim bus package. This involves 24 bus services operating out of Woodlands, Sembawang and Yishun bus interchanges.

- Service 110 were handed over to Woodlands Bus Package
- Service 652 were handed over to Seletar Bus Package
- Service 963R, NR1 and NR2 were withdrawn.

They are based at the new Mandai Bus Depot which is able to accommodate about 550 buses (co-located with the Thomson–East Coast line MRT depot) from September 2021.

In September 2020, the LTA awarded the contract for this package to Tower Transit Singapore. Operations commenced in 3 tranches from 5 September 2021, involving the transfer of the services from SMRT Buses to Tower Transit Singapore.

In January 2022, route 801 was introduced and added to the package.

Route 861 was introduced and added to this package in September 2024.

=== Jurong West Bus Package ===
In November 2022, LTA called for tenders for the Jurong West Bus Package, along with the second term of the Bukit Merah package. This involved 26 bus services operated by SBS Transit operating mainly out of Boon Lay and Joo Koon bus interchanges. The tender closed on 3 April 2023. On 18 August 2023, LTA announced that SMRT Buses had won the tender for this bus package and will take over the bus services from 2024 onwards.

=== Tampines Bus Package ===
In December 2024, LTA called for tenders for the Tampines Bus Package. This involves 26 bus services operating out of Tampines, Tampines Concourse and Tampines North bus Interchanges.

On 19 September 2025, LTA announced that Go-Ahead Singapore had won the bid to operate 27 bus services under the Tampines Bus Package from 5 July 2026.

On 24 November 2025 and 27 April 2026, Express feeder routes also introduced bus service 454 and 460. This service will also be transferred to Go Ahead Singapore from July 2026.

=== Serangoon–Eunos Bus Package ===
In December 2025, LTA called for tenders for the Serangoon–Eunos Bus Package. This involves 25 bus services operating out of Serangoon, Eunos, Woodleigh and Sims Place.

On 16 July 2026, LTA announced that SMRT Buses had the bid to operate 26 bus services under the Serangoon–Eunos Bus Package from 13 June 2027.

== Negotiated bus packages ==
In August 2016, the LTA announced the completion of the transitioning to bus contracting on 1 September 2016. The remaining nine packages covered 230 routes. They were organised in a way such that no change of employees from one operator to another was needed. Each package will last from five to 10 years. As the negotiated contracts expire, they will be put up for tender. These are the following bus service packages:

- Sengkang–Hougang (35 services) (currently under Sengkang West Bus Depot) (Note: Predicted)
- Bedok (20 services) (currently under Bedok North Bus Depot)
- Choa Chu Kang–Bukit Panjang (28 services) (currently under Gali Batu Depot)
- Woodlands (20 services) (currently under Woodlands Bus Depot and upcoming Mandai Depot from 2030)
- Serangoon–Eunos (25 services) (currently under Hougang Bus Depot and upcoming Kim Chuan Depot from June 2027)
- Clementi (23 services) (currently under Bukit Batok Bus Depot and upcoming Ulu Pandan Bus Depot from 2030)
- Bishan–Toa Payoh (22 services) (currently under Hougang Bus Depot)

== Table of bus packages ==
Package	Bus depot	Operator	Commencement date	End date (Note: Subject to a 2-year extension)	Total	Services
Tendered packages
Bulim	Bulim Bus Depot; Tengah Depot (from 2028)	Tower Transit Singapore	29 May 2021	2028	40	41, 49, 66, 77, 78, 79, 96, 97, 97e, 98/98M, 106, 143/143M, 173, 177, 183, 189, 282, 284, 285, 333, 334, 335, 452, 453, 651, 653, 657, 674, 831G/831W, 870, 871, 872, 873/873M, 874, 941, 945, 947, 984, 990, 992
Loyang	Loyang Bus Depot; Lorong Halus Bus Depot (from 2030)	Go-Ahead Singapore	4 September 2016	2030	37	2, 3, 6, 12, 12e, 15, 17/17A, 34, 36, 43, 43e, 44, 62, 68, 82, 83, 84G/84W, 85, 104, 118, 119, 136, 354, 358, 359, 381, 382G/382W, 384, 386, 403, 459, 518/518A, 661, 666, 673, 678, 683
Seletar	Seletar Bus Depot; Ang Mo Kio multi-storey Bus Depot (from 2030)	SBS Transit	16 March 2025	2030	29	24, 70/70M, 71, 76, 130, 133, 135, 138/138M, 162, 261, 262, 265, 268, 269, 650, 652, 668, 800, 803, 804, 805, 806, 807, 811, 812, 851, 851e, 852, 860
Bukit Merah	Ulu Pandan Bus Depot; Pasir Panjang Bus Depot (from 2029)	SBS Transit	28 April 2024	2029	18	5, 16/16M, 57, 93, 120, 121, 122, 123/123M, 131, 145, 160, 170/170X, 195, 198, 272, 273, 400, 993
Sembawang–Yishun	Mandai Depot; Simpang Bus Depot (from 2029)	Tower Transit Singapore	5 September 2021	2028	27	167, 169, 171, 461, 656, 663, 670, 801, 825, 853/853M, 854, 854e, 855, 856, 857, 858, 859/859A/859B, 861/861M, 882, 883/883M, 963, 963e, 965, 966, 969, 980, 981
Jurong West	Soon Lee Bus Depot	SMRT Buses	1 September 2024	2029	26	179/179A/179B, 181/181M, 182/182M, 185, 192, 193, 194, 199, 240/240M, 241, 242, 243G/243W, 246, 247, 248/248M, 249, 251, 252, 253, 254, 255, 257, 258/258M, 405, 502/502A, 974
Tampines	East Coast Integrated Depot	Go-Ahead Singapore	5 July 2026	2031	29	4, 10, 10e, 18, 19, 20, 23, 28, 29, 31, 37, 38, 39, 47, 65, 69, 72, 81, 127, 129, 291, 292, 293, 296, 298, 299, 454, 460, 646
Serangoon–Eunos	Kim Chuan Depot	SMRT Buses	13 June 2027	2032	26	11, 22, 53/53M, 55, 58, 59, 60, 63/63M, 64, 90, 94, 101, 103, 105, 109, 134, 137, 140, 141, 146, 148, 150, 154, 158, 315, 317
Negotiated packages
Serangoon–Eunos	Hougang Bus Depot	SBS Transit	1 September 2016	12 June 2027	26	11, 22, 53/53M, 55, 58, 59, 60, 63/63M, 64, 90, 94, 101, 103, 105, 109, 134, 137, 140, 141, 146, 148, 150, 154, 158, 315, 317
Sengkang–Hougang	Sengkang West Bus Depot	SBS Transit	1 September 2016	TBA	41	27, 51, 80, 86, 87, 89, 89e, 102, 107/107M, 112, 113, 114, 115, 116, 117/117M, 132, 151, 153, 159, 161, 163, 165, 324, 325, 329, 371, 372, 374, 457, 458, 654, 660/660M, 671, 672, 675, 676, 677, 679, 680, 681, 682
Bedok	Bedok North Bus Depot	SBS Transit	1 September 2016	TBA	22	9, 13, 14, 14e, 18M, 25, 30, 30e, 35/35M, 40, 42, 45, 46, 168, 196, 196e, 222, 225G/225W, 228, 229, 401, 506
Choa Chu Kang–Bukit Panjang	Gali Batu Depot	SMRT Buses	1 September 2016	TBA	31	61, 67, 75, 172, 176, 180, 184, 188, 188e, 190, 300, 301, 302, 307, 451, 455, 647, 649, 684, 920, 922, 927, 970, 972/972M, 973, 975, 976, 979, 983/983M, 985, 991
Woodlands	Woodlands Bus Depot (Until 2030)	SMRT Buses	1 September 2016	TBA	21	110, 178, 187, 648, 665, 900, 901/901M, 902, 903/903M, 904, 911, 912, 913/913M, 925/925M, 950, 960, 960e, 961/961M, 962, 964, 967
Clementi	Bukit Batok Bus Depot (Until 2030)	SBS Transit	1 September 2016	TBA	23	7, 32, 33, 48, 74, 91, 92, 95, 99, 100, 111, 147, 156, 166, 174, 174e, 175, 191, 197, 200, 201, 655, 667
Bishan–Toa Payoh	Hougang Bus Depot	SBS Transit	1 September 2016	TBA	23	8, 21, 26, 50, 52, 54, 56, 73, 88, 124, 125, 139, 142, 155, 157, 186, 230/230M, 231, 232, 235, 238, 410G/410W, 456

=== Former bus packages ===
Package	Bus depot	Operator	Commencement date	End date	Total	Services
Tendered packages
Bulim	Bulim Bus Depot	Tower Transit Singapore	29 May 2016	28 May 2021	30	41, 49, 66, 77, 78, 79, 96, 97, 97e, 98/98M, 106, 143/143M, 173, 177, 183, 189, 282, 284, 285, 333, 334, 335, 651, 663, 665, 941, 944, 945, 947, 974, 990
Seletar	Seletar Bus Depot	SBS Transit	11 March 2018	15 March 2025	29	24, 70/70M, 71, 76, 130, 133, 135, 138, 162, 261, 262, 265, 268, 269, 652, 668, 800, 803, 804, 805, 806, 807, 811, 812, 850E, 851, 851e, 852, 860
Bukit Merah	Ulu Pandan Bus Depot	SBS Transit	18 November 2018	27 April 2024	18	5, 16/16M, 57, 93, 120, 121, 122, 123/123M, 131, 145, 160, 170/170X, 195, 198, 272, 273, 400, 993
Negotiated packages
Seletar	Ang Mo Kio Bus Depot (SBS Transit)	SBS Transit	1 September 2016	10 March 2018	14	24, 70/70M, 71, 76, 130, 133, 135, 138, 162/162M, 261, 262, 265, 268, 269
Seletar	Ang Mo Kio Bus Depot (SMRT Buses)	SMRT Buses	1 September 2016	24 March 2018	12	800, 803, 804, 805, 806, 807, 811, 812, 850E, 851, 852, 860
Bukit Merah	Bukit Batok Bus Depot; Ayer Rajah Bus Park	SBS Transit	1 September 2016	17 November 2018	18	5, 16, 57, 93, 120, 121, 122, 123/123M, 131/131M, 145, 160, 170/170X, 195, 198, 272, 273, 400, 402
Sembawang–Yishun	Ang Mo Kio Bus Depot (SMRT Buses)	SMRT Buses	1 September 2016	2 October 2021	28	110, 167, 169, 171, 652, 656, 670, 825, 853/853M, 854, 854e, 855, 856, 857, 858, 859/859A/859B, 882, 883/883M, 963, 963e, 963R, 965, 966, 969, 980, 981, NR1, NR2
Jurong West	Soon Lee Bus Park	SBS Transit	1 September 2016	14 September 2024	26	179/179A, 181/181M, 182/182M, 185, 192, 193, 194, 199, 240/240M, 241, 242, 243G/243W, 246, 247, 248/248M, 249, 251, 252, 253, 254, 255, 257, 258, 405, 502/502A, 974
Tampines	Bedok North Bus Depot	SBS Transit	1 September 2016	18 July 2026	29	4, 10, 10e, 18, 19, 20, 23, 28, 29, 31, 37, 38, 39, 47, 65, 69, 72, 81, 127, 129, 291, 292, 293, 296, 298, 299, 454, 460, 646

== See also ==
- List of bus stations in Singapore
- List of former bus stations in Singapore
