= List of former bus stations in Singapore =

This is a non-exhaustive listing of former bus interchanges or terminals that were once part of Singapore's bus system, and decommissioned due to geographical retention or the introduction of new town centres, or creation of consolidated transportation hubs.

== Former bus interchanges ==
| Bus interchange | Closure date | Fate |
|---|---|---|
| Compassvale | 1 December 2024 (initially); 31 October 2026 | Bus services 110 and 374 relocated to Buangkok Bus Interchange and Sengkang Bus Interchange, respectively. It was reopened briefly from 31 January 2026 to 31 October 2026 with a handful of services relocated while Sengkang Bus Interchange was undergoing upgrading works. |
| Hougang South | 15 February 2004 | Ceased operations totally and became Kovan Hub. The vacated facility does occasionally hold atrium exhibitions and for other commercial uses. It is now converted into a community space with an open carpark on the former end-on berths. It also serves as a transit stop for coaches to and from Malaysia with routes from destinations such as Genting Highlands and Kuala Lumpur. Moreover, bus services 112, 113 and 119 still calls at the facility for passengers to alight and disembark there as a bus stop at the former sawtooth berths. Service 115 starts its journey from there, Service 53M layovers at the bus stop and service 146 have an extension to Woodleigh Bus Interchange. |
| Jurong | 1 July 1990 | Services relocated to Boon Lay, Jurong East and Clementi Bus Interchange. It functioned as a bus depot in the western part of Singapore before it was demolished when SBS Transit built a new multi storey bus depot (Soon Lee Bus Depot) along Soon Lee Road in the Jurong Industrial Area. It is located at the junction of Jalan Ahmad Ibrahim and Jurong Port Road. It was completed in 1978 at a cost of S$1.2 million, and was the first bus station in Singapore built to serve feeder services, which were then being introduced as part of a rationalisation plan by Singapore Bus Service. |
| Woodlands | 4 December 1996 | All services were relocated to Woodlands Regional Bus Interchange. |

=== Woodlands ===
Woodlands Bus Interchange is a former bus interchange that was located at Woodlands Town Centre. Initially planned in the late 1970s as part of a bus service improvement scheme, the interchange commenced operations in 1981, and had 17 berths. The announcement to build the North-South Line MRT extension and the Woodlands MRT station that was scheduled to complete and open on 10 February 1996, accelerated plans to relocate and develop an entirely new town centre for Woodlands New Town at Woodlands Square, the new regional centre for Woodlands or more precisely, the North region. In late-1996, electronic display boards of TIBS buses serving the Woodlands Bus Interchange began to display notices that the TIBS Woodlands' fleet would be moving to the new interchange at Woodlands Square, Singapore's first mass underground bus interchange – Woodlands Regional Bus Interchange, conveniently located under the Woodlands MRT station, and is connected to Causeway Point with escalators. Woodlands Regional Bus Interchange was closed on 12 March 2016 for upgrading works as part of the construction of the Stage 1 Thomson–East Coast Line Woodlands station and was temporarily replaced by Woodlands Temporary Bus Interchange. The interchange reopened as part of the Woodlands Integrated Transport Hub on 13 June 2021.

=== Hougang South ===
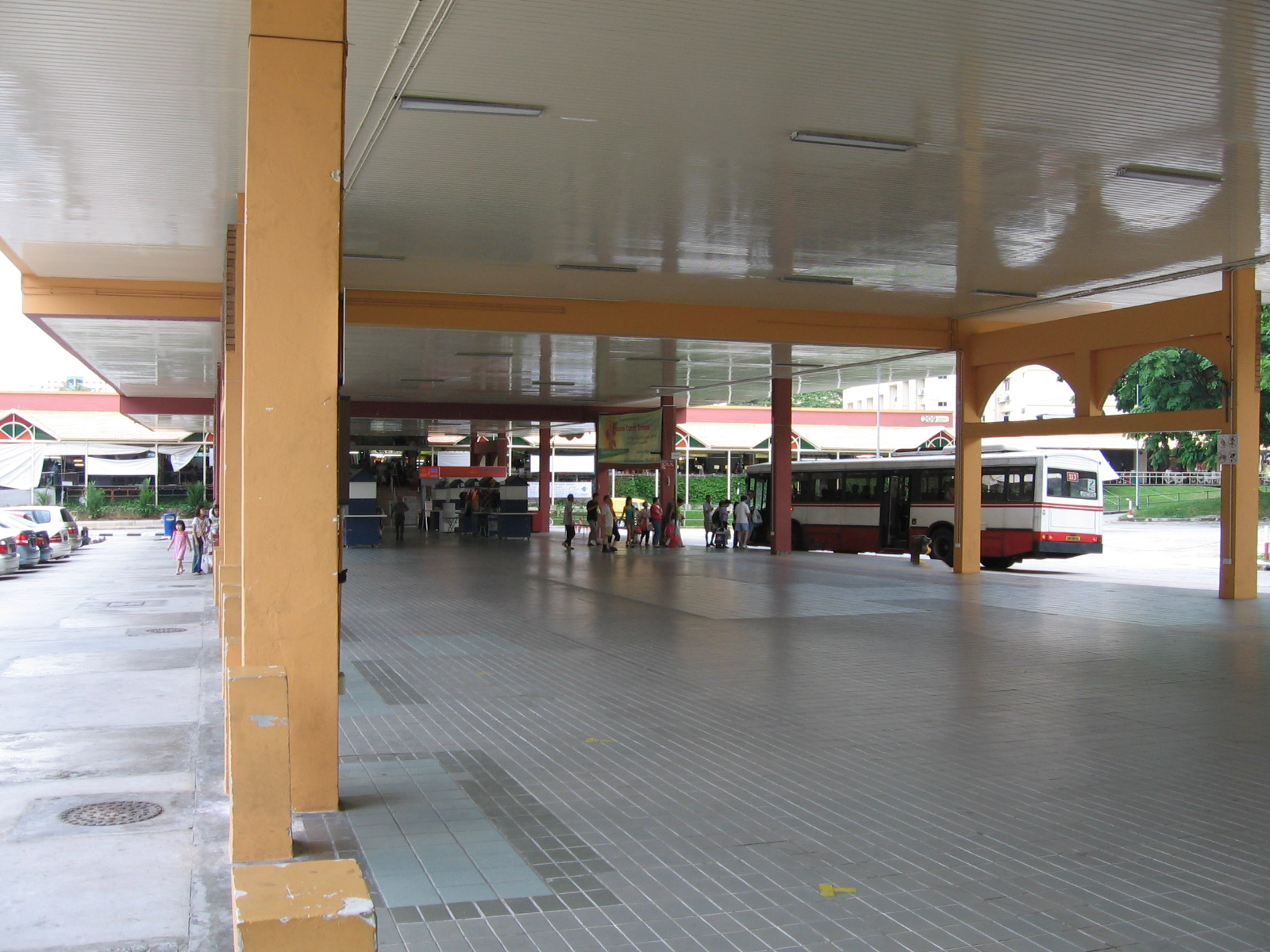
Former Hougang South Bus Interchange, now called Kovan Hub

Hougang South Bus Interchange was a bus interchange, located in Hougang Street 21, which ceased operations on 15 February 2004. The interchange's structure continues to stand pending a major redevelopment of the site, and is currently called Kovan Hub.

Initially named Hougang Bus Interchange, construction of the interchange commenced in 1981, and it commenced operations in October 1983, with an exhibition held prior to the interchange's opening to get commuters accustomed to it. Fitted out with 34 bus bays, the interchange was built to handle additional bus services with the further development of Hougang new town.

At that time, Hougang comprised just four neighbourhoods, with large tracts to the northwest of Upper Serangoon Road still undeveloped. The commercial centre at Hougang Street 21 thus served as a town centre. From the 1990s, however, the town was rapidly expanded with five more neighbourhoods constructed, and a new, permanent town centre further north was built. As is the case for all other bus interchanges (except the Eunos Bus Interchange) in which they are located in their respective town centres, the Hougang Bus Interchange was to be moved to the new town centre, while the existing facility was then converted to other uses. Its bus services were then amended to terminate at either Hougang Central or Punggol.

When this plan was publicised, it created an uproar amongst the local populace, particularly shopowners in Hougang Street 21. With the help of local politicians, their discontentments were made to the relevant authorities, resulting in a delay in the interchange's closure. The government was adamant on removing the interchange, however, as it insists it makes little sense to have two bus interchanges in one town, and the opening of the Kovan MRT station on the North East Line will help to continue bringing in the crowds. It proceeded to build a new, permanent interchange, known as the Hougang Central Bus Interchange, and renamed the existing interchange as the Hougang South Bus Interchange.

In the meantime, the vacated facility does occasionally hold atrium exhibitions and for other commercial uses. It is now converted into a community space with an open carpark on the former end-on berths. It also serves as a transit stop for coaches to and from Malaysia with routes from destinations such as Genting Highlands and Kuala Lumpur. Moreover, bus services 112, 113 and 119 still calls at the facility for passengers to alight and disembark there as a bus stop at the former sawtooth berths. Services 53M, 115 and 146 start their journey from the bus stop.

== Former bus terminals ==
| Terminal | Closure date | Status | Image |
|---|---|---|---|
| Choa Chu Kang Road End | 1971 | Downgraded to a bus stop whereas it became part of the SAFTI Live Firing Area while the public is still having limited access. | |
| Keppel Harbour | 2 May 1971 | | |
| New Market Road | 6 June 1971 | | |
| Kim Keat Avenue | 2 August 1971 | Replaced by Toa Payoh Town Centre Bus Terminus. | |
| Lorong 1 Toa Payoh | 2 August 1971 | Replaced by Toa Payoh Town Centre Bus Terminus. | |
| Lorong 6 Toa Payoh | 2 August 1971 | Replaced by Toa Payoh Town Centre Bus Terminus. | |
| Clementi Road | 14 September 1971 | | |
| Keppel Road | 10 November 1971 | | |
| Changi Road | 1 July 1973 | Replaced by Chai Chee Bus Terminal. | |
| Fidelio Street | 1 July 1973 | Replaced by Chai Chee Bus Terminal. | |
| Joo Chiat Place | 1 July 1973 | Replaced by Chai Chee Bus Terminal. | |
| Telok Kurau | 1 July 1973 | Replaced by Chai Chee Bus Terminal. | |
| Upper Changi Road (13.3km) | 1974 | Near to Anglican High School. | |
| Jalan Jurong Kechil | 3 February 1974 | | |
| Kallang Park | 3 February 1974 | | |
| Marsiling Avenue | 3 February 1974 | | |
| South Buona Vista Road | 3 February 1974 | | |
| Toh Tuck Road | 3 February 1974 | | |
| Changi Point | 1975 | Relocated to Changi Village Bus Terminal. | |
| Outram Park | 1 January 1976 | | |
| Kranji Road | 6 June 1976 | | |
| Kampong Bahru | 8 August 1976 | | |
| Rotherham Gate | 23 August 1976 | | |
| Jalan Kolam Ayer | 13 December 1976 | Replaced by Sims Place Bus Terminal. | |
| Sembawang Hills Drive | 16 May 1977 | | |
| Lorong 5 Geylang | 17 October 1977 | | |
| Benoi Road | 1 June 1978 | Replaced by Jurong Bus Interchange. | |
| Corporation Drive | 1 June 1978 | Replaced by Jurong Bus Interchange. | |
| International Road | 1 June 1978 | Replaced by Jurong Bus Interchange. | |
| Jalan Ahmad Ibrahim | 1 June 1978 | Replaced by Jurong Bus Interchange. | |
| Jalan Boon Lay | 1 June 1978 | Replaced by Jurong Bus Interchange. | |
| Shipyard Road | 1 June 1978 | Replaced by Jurong Bus Interchange. | |
| Tanjong Kling | 1 June 1978 | Replaced by Jurong Bus Interchange. | |
| Balestier Road | 2 December 1978 | | |
| Bedok South | 8 April 1979 | Replaced by Bedok Bus Interchange. | |
| Yio Chu Kang Road | 26 October 1979 | | |
| Mei Chin Road | 25 November 1979 | Replaced by Bukit Merah Bus Interchange. | |
| Lengkok Bahru | 23 December 1979 | Replaced by Bukit Merah Bus Interchange. | |
| Ang Mo Kio Avenue 6 | 6 January 1980 | Replaced by Ang Mo Kio Avenue 3 Bus Terminal. | |
| Upper Changi Road (15.5km) | 15 June 1980 | Replaced by Somapah Bus Interchange/Terminal, and is at the current site of ITE College East. | |
| Bukit Merah Central | 28 September 1980 | Replaced by Bukit Merah Bus Interchange. | |
| Clementi Avenue 3 | 16 November 1980 | Replaced by Clementi Bus Interchange. | |
| Jurong Road 10ms Market | 1 February 1981 | | |
| Telok Blangah Heights | 15 February 1981 | Replaced by Bukit Merah Bus Interchange. | |
| Telok Blangah Way | 16 February 1981 | Replaced by Bukit Merah Bus Interchange. | |
| Bukit Timah 7ms | 25 May 1981 | | |
| Paya Lebar Airport | 30 June 1981 | Closure of Paya Lebar Airport. | |
| Ang Mo Kio Avenue 3 | 5 July 1981 | Replaced by Ang Mo Kio Central Bus Terminal. | |
| Pasir Panjang | 5 July 1981 | Replaced by Kent Ridge Bus Terminal. | |
| Upper Bukit Timah | 15 November 1981 | Replaced by Kent Ridge Bus Terminal. | |
| Commonwealth Avenue | 27 May 1982 | Replaced by Buona Vista Bus Terminal. | |
| Jalan Aman | 2 January 1983 | Replaced by St Michael's Bus Terminal. | |
| Ang Mo Kio Avenue 10 | 10 April 1983 | Replaced by Ang Mo Kio Bus Interchange. | |
| Ang Mo Kio Central 2 | 10 April 1983 | Replaced by Ang Mo Kio Bus Interchange. | |
| Ang Mo Kio Industrial Park 1 | 10 April 1983 | Replaced by Ang Mo Kio Bus Interchange. | |
| Ang Mo Kio Industrial Park 2 | 10 April 1983 | Replaced by Ang Mo Kio Bus Interchange. | |
| Hougang Street 21 | 30 October 1983 | Replaced by Hougang South Bus Interchange. | |
| Tampines Way | 30 October 1983 | Replaced by Hougang South Bus Interchange. | |
| Upper Serangoon | 30 October 1983 | Replaced by Hougang South Bus Interchange. | |
| Upper Jurong | 30 October 1983 | Replaced by Tuas Bus Terminal. | |
| Toa Payoh Town Centre | 26 December 1983 | Replaced by Toa Payoh Bus Interchange. | |
| Tanjong Berlayar | 1984 | | |
| Tanjong Rhu | 27 May 1984 | | |
| Kaki Bukit Malay Settlement | 17 June 1984 | Replaced by Jalan Eunos Bus Terminal. | |
| Tanjong Pagar Road | 13 January 1985 | Replaced by HarbourFront Bus Interchange. | |
| Anson Road | 27 January 1985 | Replaced by Prince Edward Road Bus Terminal. | |
| Alexandra Road | 28 April 1985 | Replaced by Clementi Bus Interchange. | |
| Jurong East Central | 30 June 1985 | Replaced by Jurong East Bus Interchange. | |
| Chai Chee | 15 September 1985 | Replaced by Bedok Bus Interchange expansion. | |
| Redhill Close | 15 September 1985 | Replaced by Bukit Merah Bus Interchange. | |
| Sembawang | 18 January 1987 | Replaced by Yishun Central Bus Terminal. | |
| Jalan Eunos | 22 March 1987 | Replaced by Eunos Bus Terminal. 51 was later merged with 54 to extend to Hougang South. | |
| Lower Delta | 12 April 1987 | Replaced by HarbourFront Bus Interchange. | |
| Prince Edward Road | 28 June 1987 | Replaced by Shenton Way Bus Terminal. | |
| Ulu Pandan | 5 July 1987 | | |
| Yishun Avenue 5 | 23 August 1987 | Replaced by Yishun Bus Interchange. | |
| Yishun Central | 23 August 1987 | Replaced by Yishun Bus Interchange. | |
| Bukit Batok | 27 September 1987 | Replaced by Bukit Batok Bus Interchange. | |
| Tampines Avenue 5 | 29 November 1987 | Replaced by Tampines Bus Interchange. | |
| Serangoon Avenue 3 | 13 March 1988 | Replaced by Serangoon Bus Interchange. | |
| Serangoon Gardens | 13 March 1988 | Replaced by Serangoon Bus Interchange. | |
| Marine Terrace | 26 June 1988 | Before the terminal shifted to its former site (Marine Parade Bus Terminal) in the 1980s, it was located at Marine Terrace within the Marine Parade housing estate. There were Services 15, 16 and 211. Service 15 former routing merged into the current Service 196, Service 16 remains today being extended to Siglap Road and later extended once more to absorb CSS 608 routing to Bedok while Service 211 was a feeder service to Katong which was withdrawn on 5 March 1989. | |
| Bukit Timah | 31 July 1988 | | |
| Upper Changi | 23 October 1988 | Replaced by Tampines Bus Interchange. | |
| Commonwealth Drive | 18 December 1988 | | |
| Bishan | 30 April 1989 | Replaced by Bishan Bus Interchange. | |
| Holland | 11 June 1989 | | |
| Labrador | 27 August 1989 | | |
| Delta | 5 November 1989 | This bus terminal was discontinued with the opening of MRT. | |
| Somapah | 5 November 1989 | The terminal was originally a bus maintenance and refuelling depot owned by the then Associated Bus Company that ran two services, numbered 1 and 2, from Changi Point to the city. With the opening of the MRT and the discontinuation of Service 1, Somapah Bus Terminal closed down. It became Singapore University of Technology and Design (SUTD). | |
| Eunos | 10 December 1989 | Replaced by Eunos Bus Interchange. | |
| Pasir Ris | 10 December 1989 | Replaced by Pasir Ris Bus Interchange. | |
| Choa Chu Kang | 8 April 1990 | Replaced by Choa Chu Kang Bus Interchange. | |
| Circuit Road | 24 June 1990 | | |
| Tuas (Pioneer Road) | 1 July 1990 | Replaced by Boon Lay Bus Interchange. | |
| NTI | 7 April 1991 | Replaced by Boon Lay Bus Interchange. | |
| Princess Elizabeth | 28 April 1991 | Princess Elizabeth estate in Hillview was fully demolished in the coming years. | |
| Potong Pasir | 29 March 1992 | | |
| Old Upper Thomson | 3 May 1992 | Replaced by Yio Chu Kang Bus Interchange; Converted to a public car park. | |
| MacPherson | 28 June 1992 | Merged with Sims Place Bus Terminal. | |
| South Canal | 4 April 1993 | Replaced by Marina Centre Bus Terminal. | |
| Upper Serangoon Road End | 17 December 1994 | Replaced by Hougang Central Bus Interchange. | |
| Marsiling | 4 February 1996 | Replaced by Woodlands Regional Bus Interchange. It was the original bus terminal serving the entire north of Singapore, which was predominantly undeveloped and neglected in the course of developing the country's suburb throughout the 1960s till the 1980s. Development of this area started to sprout when former-Deputy Prime Minister Tony Tan (who later became President of the Republic of Singapore) became the MP for Sembawang, and pledged to develop Sembawang into a prosperous suburb. This allowed for the creation of the Woodlands New Town and the entire extension of Woodlands from the original old town centre at Woodlands Centre Road and the integration of Marsiling, a small estate of only around 20 4-storeys HDB blocks, into the new town. Woodlands New Town was speedily developing in the mid-1980s and first plans to build an entirely new bus interchange to replace the relatively small Marsiling Bus Terminal surfaces after Woodlands become part of the new Sembawang GRC in 1988. By the mid-1990s, the Woodlands Bus Interchange based at Woodlands Centre Road was fully functional. Marsiling Bus Terminal continued operations with Services 950, 951, 952 with Service 950 plying the route to Shenton Way, Service 951 to Boon Lay and Service 952 to Marina Centre, were periodically moved to the new bus interchange. The closure of the bus terminal comes as TIBS axed the 95x services, in favour of the new 96x services that served the downtown city areas. | |
| Singapore Zoological Gardens | 28 April 1996 | Converted to a bus stop when it was fully extended to Choa Chu Kang. | |
| Holland Drive | 1998 | Roadside bus lanes converted into lane for the main road. | |
| Crawford Street | 27 December 1998 | Replaced by Lorong 1 Geylang Bus Terminal, all buses extended to Lorong 1 Geylang as a result. One bus route is operated by SMRT Buses and one bus route is operated by Tower Transit currently. | |
| Bukit Panjang | 26 December 1999 | Replaced by Bukit Panjang Bus Interchange. | |
| Sengkang | 28 April 2001 | Replaced by Sengkang Bus Interchange. | |
| Hougang | 20 May 2001 | Replaced by Hougang Central Bus Interchange with the completion of the North East Line. | |
| Marine Parade | 16 September 2001 | Replaced by Upper East Coast Bus Terminal (Service 13 and 853#), Bedok Bus Interchange (Service 196) and to loop at Siglap Road (Service 16, 55, 76, 135, 155). When the land plot was slated as the new site of Victoria School, the terminal was demolished to make way. Old routes of Service 16, 55, 135, 155 that used to terminate there were made to make a loop around the school site. The former site of the roadside terminal is now replaced with a bus stop and Service 36 and 401 serves the area today. It was constructed by the Singapore Bus Service in 1981 at a cost of $500,000, as part of its plan to eliminate roadside bus terminals. The terminal also allowed for more bus services to serve the Marine Parade area. However, the terminal's construction was opposed by residents of nearby housing estates due to concerns over noise pollution. Consequently, SBS noted that the terminal would be "tastefully designed and properly landscaped", and the site was at least 220 metres away from the nearest housing estate. | |
| Rumah Tinggi | 2002 | Temporarily reopened on 26 October 2025. | |
| Teban Gardens | 12 May 2002 | Replaced by Soon Lee Bus Depot. Service 143 was extended to Jurong East Bus Interchange and 331 subsequently replaced by 143M. | |
| Woodlands Checkpoint | 23 March 2003 | | |
| Jalan Kayu | 7 December 2003 | Converted to a public carpark and demolished in the late 2000s. With the closure of the terminal, Service 103 was integrated with Service 214E (renumbered into 820 and 378) to form Serangoon - Picadilly (Loop). Bus 379 (originally numbered 821 and 214W) was withdrawn with the introduction of service 103M (now integrated into main 103 with the partial closure of West Camp Road), which started from Serangoon Interchange, but looped at West Camp Road instead. It was once served by service 103 and 163, before 163 was extended to Sengkang Temporary Interchange and 103 was amended under NEL Rationalisation Phase 3. | Site of former Jalan Kayu Bus Terminal |
| Punggol | 7 December 2003 | Replaced by Punggol Bus Interchange. Service 82 was then shortened to run from Punggol Bus Interchange and loop at Serangoon Central, and service 84 was then introduced from Punggol to Punggol Road End (Loop). | |
| Sin Ming Road | 5 September 2004 | Closed down with the removal of City Shuttle Service 605. Also replaced by Ang Mo Kio Bus Interchange with the extension of service 130 and Bishan Bus Interchange with the renumbering from 353, to 57 and 410. The terminal was one of the few surviving terminals of the 1970s era in which it was common for terminals to be built along the road side with only a small booth for drivers to report when completing their runs. | |
| Lim Chu Kang | 27 February 2005 | Converted to a bus stop. | |
| Admiralty Road West | 20 November 2005 | Replaced by Sembawang Bus Interchange. | |
| Sembawang Road End | 20 November 2005 | Replaced by Sembawang Bus Interchange. | |
| Marina South Pier | 28 November 2011 | | |
| Taman Jurong | 22 November 2015 | This is the last and latest roadside bus terminal to be built in Singapore. It opened in 2013 when the new bus service 49 was introduced from Taman Jurong to Jurong West Street 41. The terminal was also used by bus service 98A, a short trip service from Lakeside MRT Station to Corporation Rd, as a layover stop. Although the facilities were similar to Ghim Moh and Sims Place Terminals, passengers were not allowed to board or alight at Taman Jurong Terminal. On 22 November 2015, the container box office for bus captains to rest in during their break was removed as the bus service 49 was extended to Jurong East. Service 98A buses continue to layover till 2018. As of 2018, the bus bays were covered up and remains of the terminal can no longer be found. | Taman Jurong Bus Terminal as of March 2015 |
| New Bridge Road | 10 March 2018 | Replaced by Kampong Bahru Bus Terminal. It was opened on 6 June 1987 and was near to Outram Park MRT station. This bus terminal had an alighting berth after the entrance of the bus park. No boarding facilities were available at the terminal, thus was done at the bus stop outside the terminal. Before the terminal was built, many bus services that ply the terminal used to ply at some bus stops along New Bridge Road. The plot of land occupied by it will be redeveloped into a new elective surgery centre by the Singapore General Hospital. | |

== Former bus depots ==
| Depot | Closure date | Status |
|---|---|---|
| Changi Bus Depot | December 1982 | Replaced by Bedok North Bus Depot. |
| Bedok South Bus Park | December 1982 | Replaced by Bedok North Bus Depot. |
| Bedok Bus Depot | 1984 | Replaced by Hougang Bus Depot. |
| Paya Lebar Bus Depot | 1984 | Replaced by Hougang Bus Depot. |
| Alexandra Bus Depot | January 1985 | Replaced by Bukit Batok Bus Depot. |
| Portsdown Bus Park | January 1985 | Replaced by Bukit Batok Bus Depot. |
| Whitley Bus Park | January 1985 | Replaced by Bukit Batok Bus Depot. |
| King Albert Park Bus Park | January 1985 | Replaced by Bukit Batok Bus Depot. |
| Woodlands Bus Depot | 1996 | Merged with Bukit Batok Bus Depot due to redevelopment into the Singapore Turf Club. |
| Toa Payoh Bus Depot | 1997 | Renamed to Braddell Bus Park; later merged with Hougang Bus Depot in November 2025. |
| Jurong Bus Park | 12 May 2002 | Replaced by Soon Lee Bus Park. |
| Changi Bus Park | 11 December 2016 | Replaced by East Coast Integrated Depot. |
| Ayer Rajah Bus Park | 9 September 2018 | Replaced by Ulu Pandan Bus Depot. |
| Ang Mo Kio Bus Depot (SMRT) | 3 October 2021 | Replaced by Mandai Depot. |
| Ang Mo Kio Bus Depot (SBST) | 3 January 2025 | Replaced by Sengkang West Bus Depot. |
| Kranji Bus Depot | 4 October 2025 | Replaced by Gali Batu Depot. |
| Braddell Bus Park | December 2025 | Replaced by Hougang Bus Depot. |

== See also ==
- Public buses of Singapore
