= Bus depot =

Bus depot may refer to:

- Bus garage, where buses are stored and maintained
- Bus station, where buses stop to pick up and drop off passengers
