= Hougang Bus Depot =

Bus depot in North-East Region, Singapore

Hougang Bus Depot: 后港巴士车厂; Depo Bas Hougang; ஹவ்காங் பேருந்து பணிமனை

General information
- Location: 4 Defu Avenue 1 Singapore 539536
- Coordinates: 1.345995°N 103.892454°E
- System: Bus depot
- Owner: SBS Transit
- Operator: SBS Transit

History
- Opened: 1984; 42 years ago
Location

Hougang Bus Depot is an SBS Transit East District bus depot located in Hougang, Singapore. It is the oldest bus depot in Singapore with an estimated fleet of around 700 buses operating out of the depot.

== History ==
Hougang Bus Depot started operations in 1984 when the north-east which is Hougang and Serangoon was developed and previously, all operations had been on Ang Mo Kio Bus Depot and Bedok North Bus Depot respectively.

The depot is also home to ComfortDelGro Engineering (CDGE)'s assembly facility since 1994, relocating it from MacKenzie Road and Woodlands. All locally-assembled buses are ready production line, which is SBS Transit's Leyland & Volvo Olympians (some B10TL), Dennis Trident (3-Axle) and Volvo B9TL till December 2017.

In April 2024, the training center located at the depot was moved to the Ulu Pandan Bus Depot (UPDEP) to combine driver and technician training in the same facility.

With the closure of Ang Mo Kio Bus Depot on 3 January 2025, around two-thirds of its buses were shifted to Hougang Bus Depot the next day while buses under the Sengkang-Hougang Bus Package were shifted to the newly opened Sengkang West Bus Depot. Operation at Braddell Bus Park was also moved to Hougang Bus Depot in December 2025, ahead of the expiration of the land lease in August 2026.

Hougang Bus Depot will serve buses in the Serangoon-Eunos Bus Package until Kim Chuan Bus Depot opens in June 2027 and the aforementioned bus package is handed over to SMRT Buses, at which point its operations will be restricted to the Bishan-Toa Payoh Bus Package.
