= Bukit Batok Bus Depot =

Bus depot located in Bukit Batok

Coordinates: 1.3403°N 103.7545°E

Bukit Batok Bus Depot 武吉巴督巴士车厂 Depo Bas Bukit Batok

General information
- Location: 550 Bukit Batok Street 23, Singapore 659519.
- System: Bus depot
- Owner: SBS Transit Ltd (ComfortDelGro Corporation)
- Operator: SBS Transit Ltd
- Bus operators: SBS Transit Ltd (ComfortDelGro Corporation)

History
- Opened: January 1985; 41 years ago
Location

Bukit Batok Bus Depot is a bus depot located at 550 Bukit Batok Street 23, Singapore 659519. It is over 50,000 square metres, with bus washing facilities, a canteen, and fuel stations.

== History ==
Bukit Batok Bus Depot was built by SBS for $12 million, commencing operations in January 1985 replacing the old bus depots at Alexandra and Woodlands, including the Portsdown, Whitley and King Albert bus parks. The King Albert bus park was demolished to make way for King Albert Park. The Green Bus garage was formerly located at Toh Tuck, and was relocated in 1974.
