= Bulim Bus Depot =

Bus depot in Singapore

Bulim Bus Depot: 武林巴士车厂; Depo Bas Bulim; புலிம் பேருந்து பணிமனை

General information
- Location: 21 Bulim Drive; Singapore 648170
- Coordinates: 1.361019°N 103.705100°E
- Operator: Tower Transit Singapore

Other information
- Website: www.towertransit.sg

History
- Opened: 6 December 2015; 10 years ago
Location

Bulim Bus Depot is a bus depot located along Bulim Avenue in Jurong West, Singapore. The first bus depot to be built by the Land Transport Authority, it serves 30 bus services under the Bulim Bus Package. Since 31 July 2015, the Bulim Bus Depot has been operated by Tower Transit Singapore. The depot was officially opened by Hong Kah MP Amy Khor on 6 December 2015.

The depot accommodates about 500 buses and will be equipped with facilities for daily bus operations, bus maintenance and a rest area for bus drivers.

== History ==
Announced by Land Transport Authority on 23 April 2013, the bus depot will be the first depot that LTA is developing and funding, as part of the review of the enhanced structural assistance that Government is providing the bus industry announced in Committee of Supply (COS) 2012. The depot is intended to accommodate the additional buses that will be brought in over the next few years.

The operator's existing bus depots and bus park were reaching full capacity, and the new facilities were necessary to support the growing number of buses as the overall bus capacity is progressively increased under the Bus Service Enhancement Programme (BSEP).

On 31 July 2015, Land Transport Authority handed over the depot to Tower Transit Singapore which then allowed Tower Transit to prepare for its operations early, including fitting out the depot and training its bus captains and technicians.
