= Seletar Bus Depot =

Bus depot in Singapore

Seletar Bus Depot: 实里达巴士车厂; Depo Bas Seletar

General information
- Location: 3 Yio Chu Kang Crescent; Singapore 786010
- Coordinates: 1.3927°N 103.8365°E
- System: Bus depot
- Operator: SBS Transit Ltd (ComfortDelGro Corporation)

Other information
- Website: www.sbstransit.com.sg

History
- Opened: 27 January 2018; 8 years ago
Location

Seletar Bus Depot, formerly named Sungei Seletar Bus Depot, is the third bus depot constructed by the Land Transport Authority (LTA) in Singapore. It is located off Yio Chu Kang Road and houses 29 routes under the Seletar Bus Package.

Completed in 2017, the bus depot is able to accommodate about 500 buses and be equipped with facilities for daily bus operations, bus maintenance and a rest area for bus drivers. An access road (Yio Chu Kang Crescent) was built to serve the depot. The depot was officially opened by Minister for Transport Khaw Boon Wan on 27 January 2018.

== History ==
On 7 June 2016, the LTA called for tenders to operate 26 routes based at Ang Mo Kio Bus Interchange, Yio Chu Kang Bus Interchange, and Yishun Bus Interchange out of the new depot as part of its new contracting model. The bus services will be operated by the successful tenderer for a service term of five years, with a possible two-year extension based on good performance. On 19 April 2017, LTA awarded the bus package to SBS Transit.

SBS Transit took over the services in the bus package in three tranches in March 2018, as SBS Transit was already operating about half of the bus services. In December 2024, in preparation for the closure of Ang Mo Kio Bus Depot, garaging of several bus services were shifted over to Seletar Bus Depot, and SMRT Buses ended its tenancy at Seletar Bus Depot.

== Services ==
24, 70 and 130 are operated from the depot.
