= Bus garage =

Storage and maintenance facility

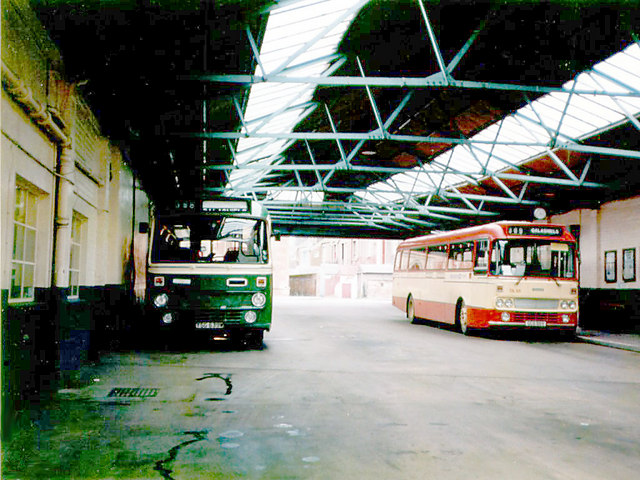
The interior of the Lowland Scottish bus depot in Kelso, Scotland, in 1985

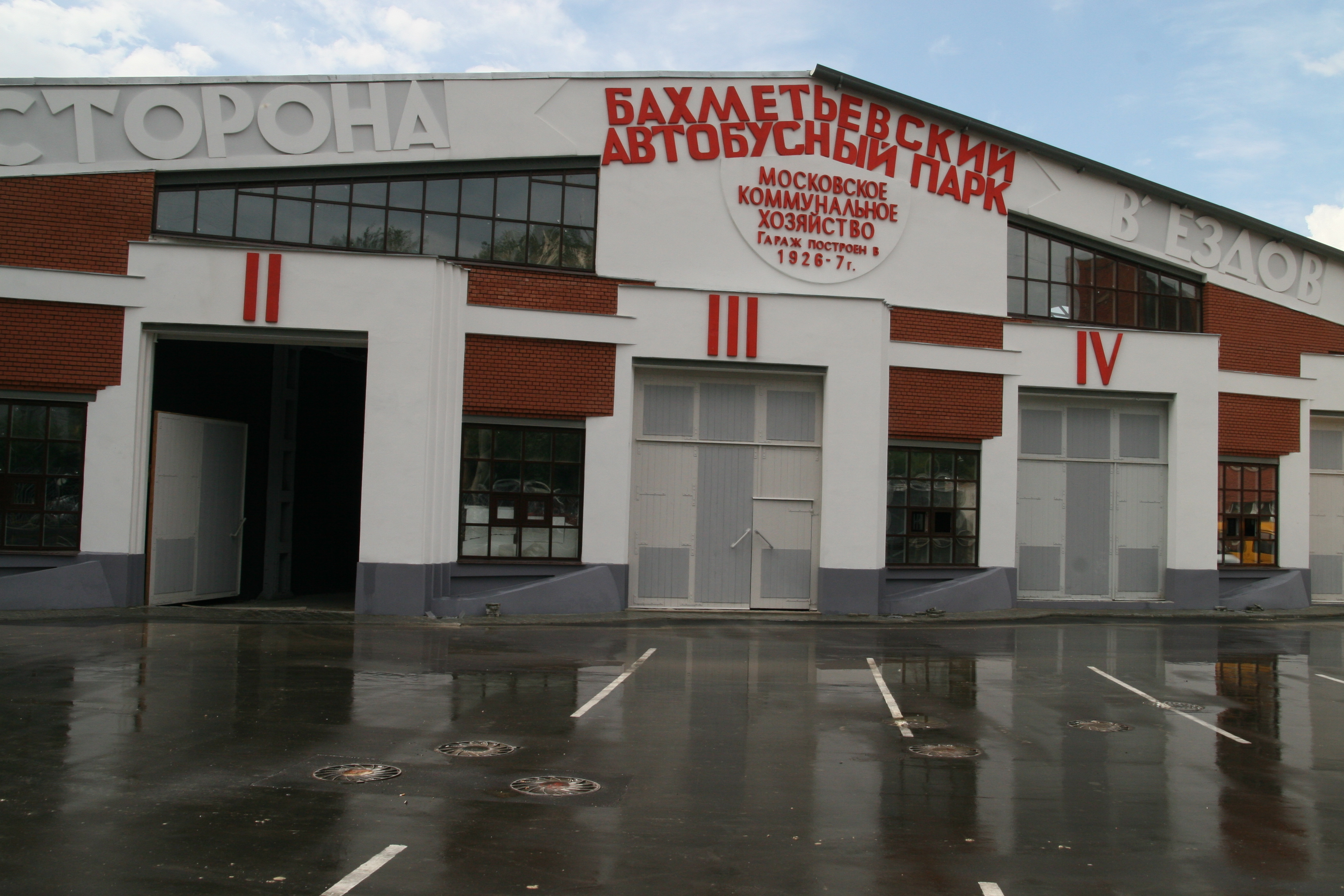
Bakhmetevsky bus garage in Moscow

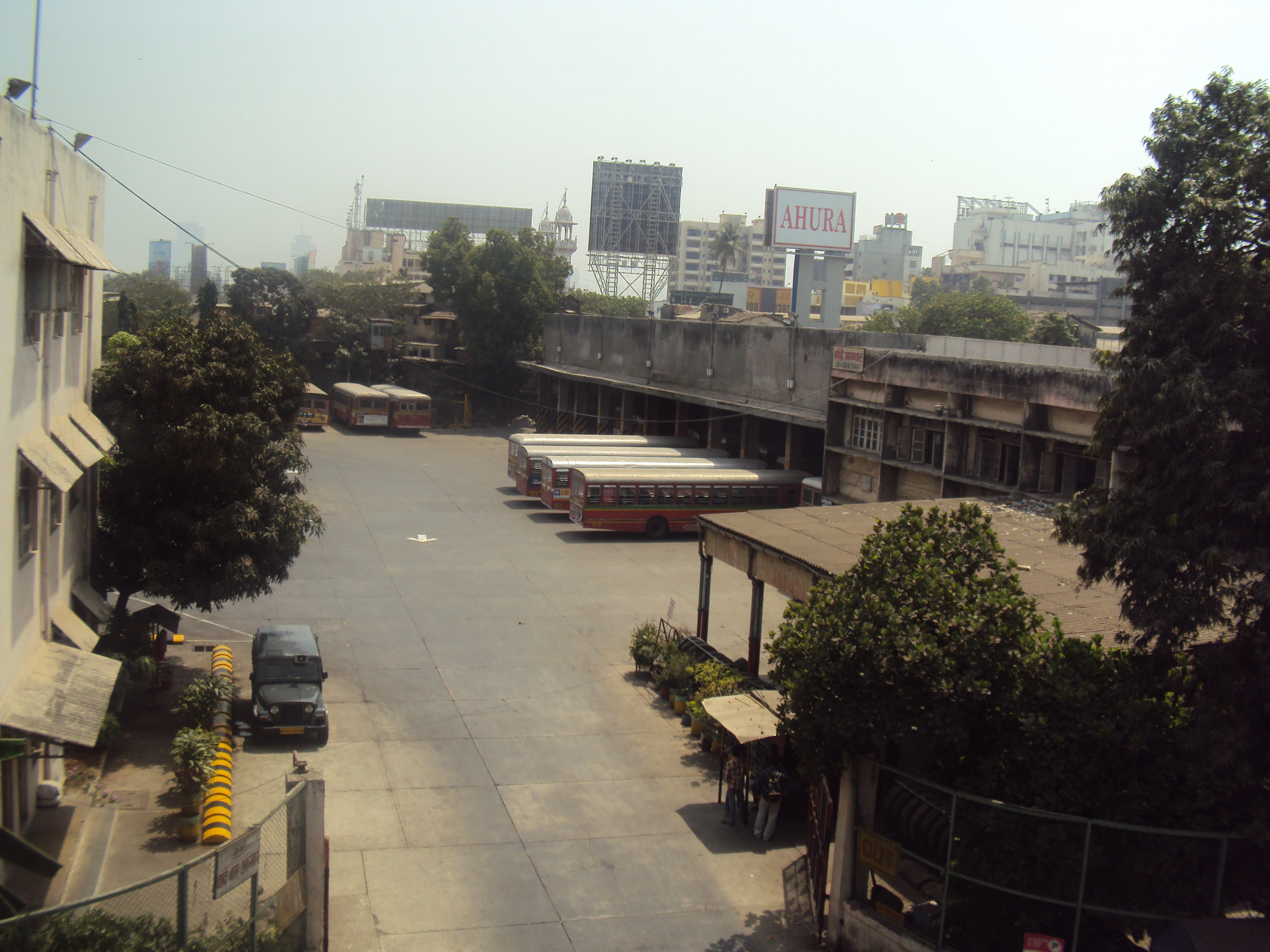
A BEST Bus depot in Bandra, Mumbai

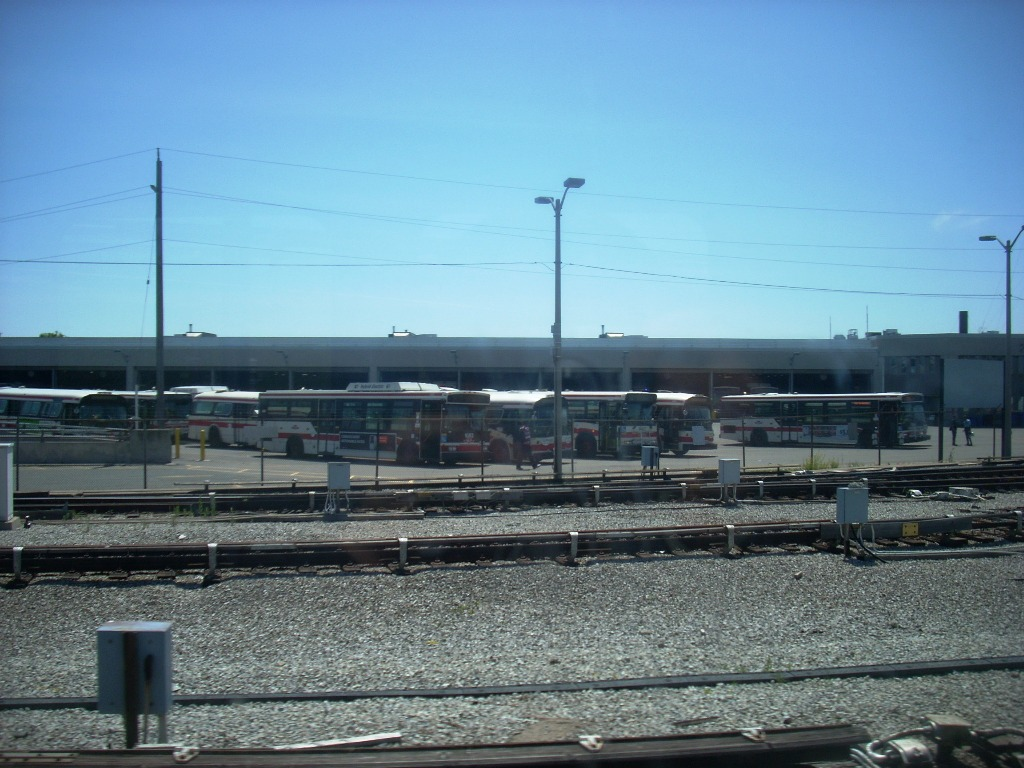
A typical example of a garage - Wilson Bus Garage (Toronto)

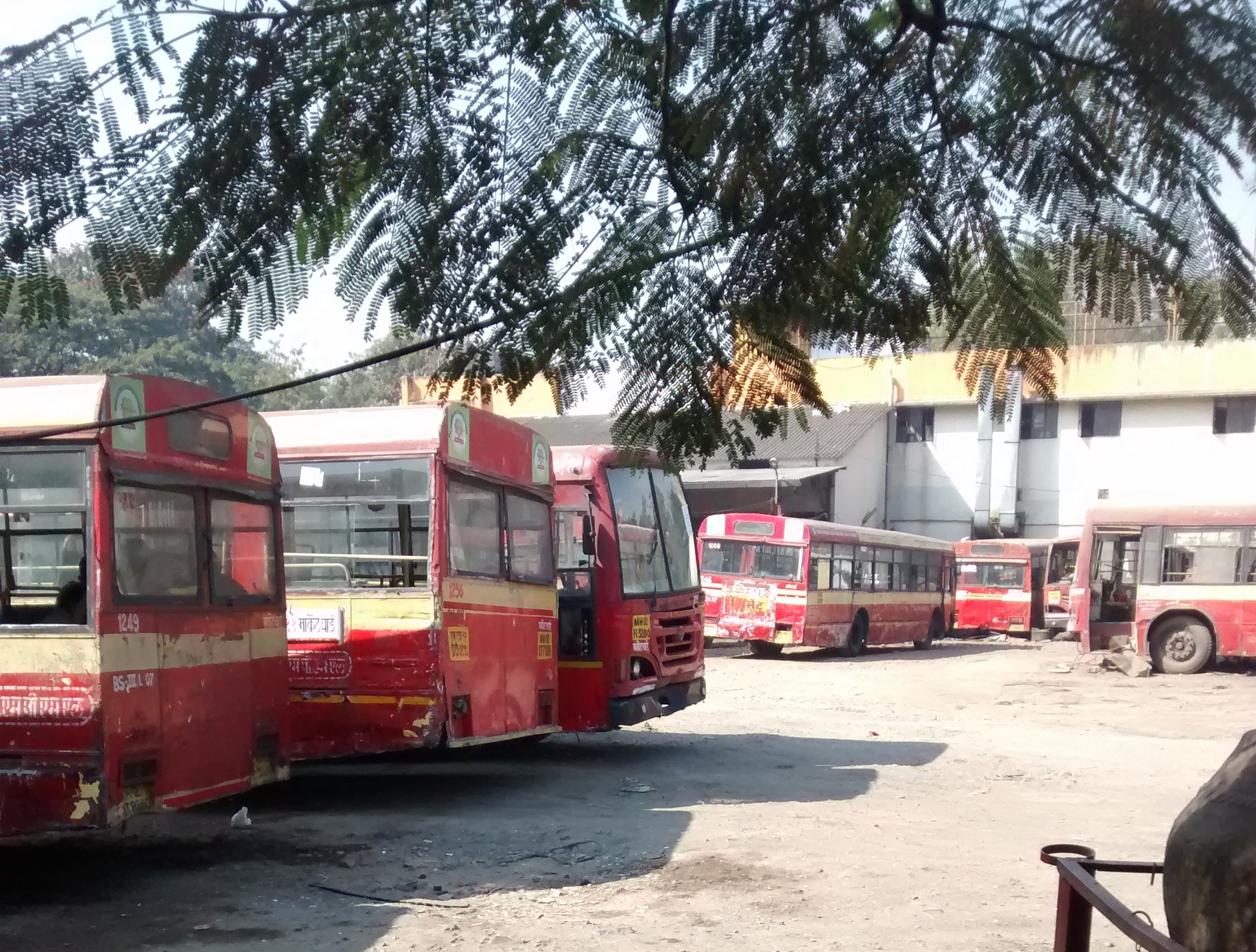
PMPML buses at the Market Yard depot, Pune, India

A bus garage, also known as a bus depot, (Note: The term "bus depot" may also be used to refer to a bus station, a place where tickets are sold or where transfers to other bus routes are possible.) bus base or bus barn, is a facility where buses are stored and maintained. In many conurbations, bus garages are on the site of former car barns or tram sheds, where trams (streetcars) were stored, and the operation transferred to buses. In other areas, garages were built to replace horse-drawn omnibus yards or on virgin sites when populations were not as high as now.

== Description ==
Most bus garages will contain the following elements:

- Internal parking
- External parking
- Fueling point
- Fuel storage tanks
- Engineering section
- Inspection pits
- Bus wash
- Brake test lane
- Staff canteen/break room
- Administration office

Smaller garages may contain the minimum engineering facilities, restricted to light servicing capabilities only. Garages may also contain recovery vehicles, often converted buses, although their incidence has declined with the use of contractors to recover break-downs, and the increase in reliability.

Overnight, the more valuable or regularly in-service buses will usually be stored in the interior of the garage, with less used or older service vehicles, and vehicles withdrawn for storage or awaiting disposal, stored externally. During the day, internal and external areas will see a variety of movements. Heritage vehicles are almost exclusively stored inside the garage.

Often garages will feature rest rooms for drivers assigned to 'as required' duties, whereby they may be required to drive relief or replacement buses in the event of breakdown. The garage may also have 'light duties' drivers, who merely move the buses internally around the garage, often called shunting. Shunter or light duty drivers are often employed in larger depot facilities and work night shifts in order to position buses in the correct order for morning departures from the depot with the first buses due to leave the depot parked logical order nearest the exit. Because they are driving on privately owned land in many jurisdictions a full bus licence may not be required to perform such tasks. In addition they may also perform other tasks such as cleaning buses, refuelling and light maintenance tasks.

== United Kingdom ==
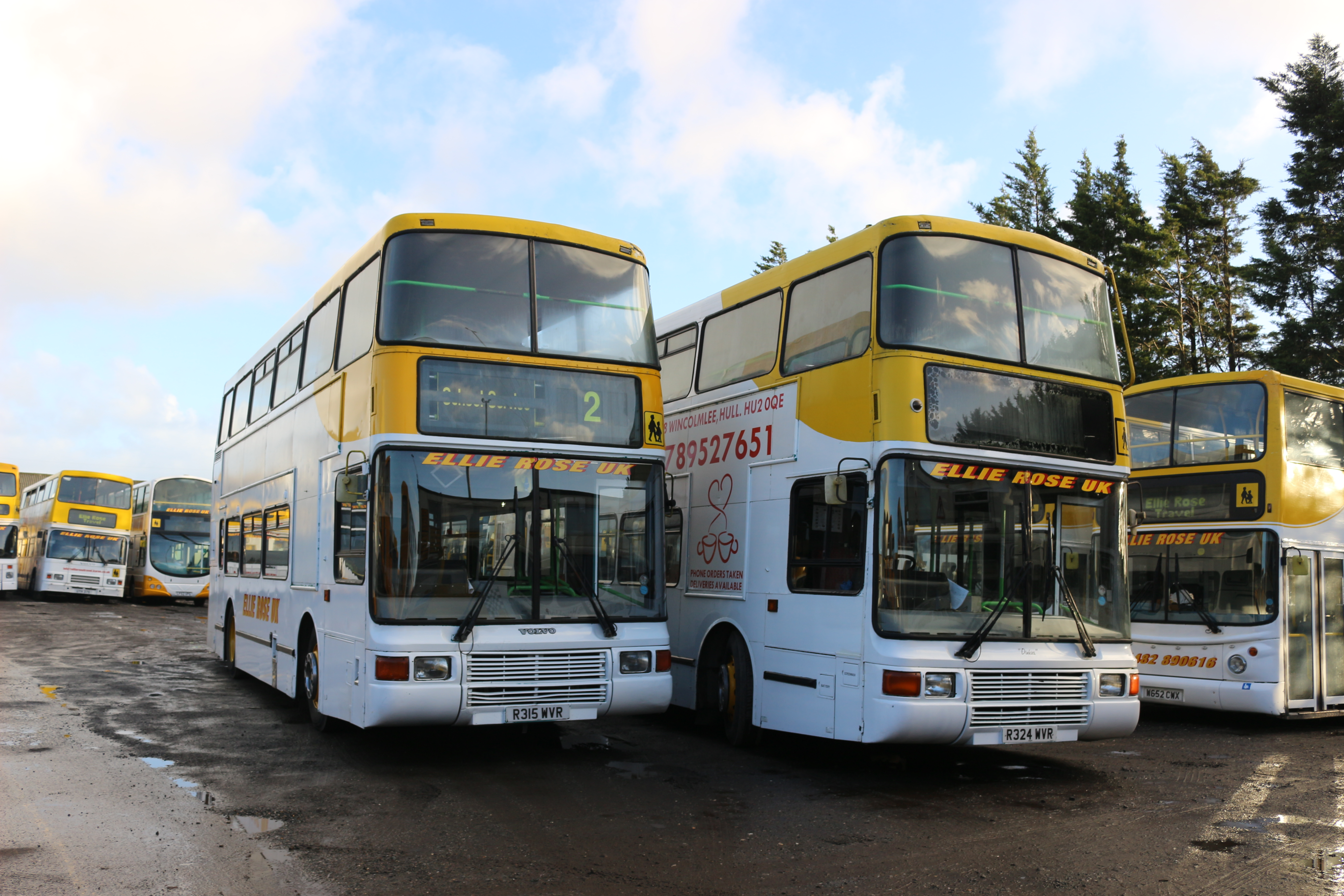
Buses at the Ellie Rose depot, in Hull, East Yorkshire.

Several bus companies such as London Buses and Lothian Buses used to operate multiple storage garages around their operating area, supplemented by a central works facility. Central works have declined with increase in sub-contract engineering, and improvements in mechanical reliability of bus designs. Also, the practice of routine mid-life refurbishment of bus fleets has declined, which has resulted in generally shorter service lives.

Bus garages will generally have large areas unobstructed by supporting columns as well as high roofs, especially for storage of double-decker buses. Recently in London, the transfer of routes from double-decker operation to articulated buses has caused problems at some garages that were found to be too small to accommodate all the replacement buses, requiring splitting of allocations, or the building of new garages.

Some bus companies in the UK make use of outstations (or out-stations) as an additional bus storage facility. These are generally outdoor parking locations, where buses are stored overnight or between peaks, which are more conveniently located for operations, reducing dead mileage. There does not appear to be a universal definition of an outstation, but it seems agreed that there are no maintenance facilities at a bus outstation.

== See also ==
- Bus station
- Railway workshop
- Motive power depot
