= Hume MRT station =

Mass Rapid Transit station in Singapore

Hume DT4 谦道 ஹியூம்
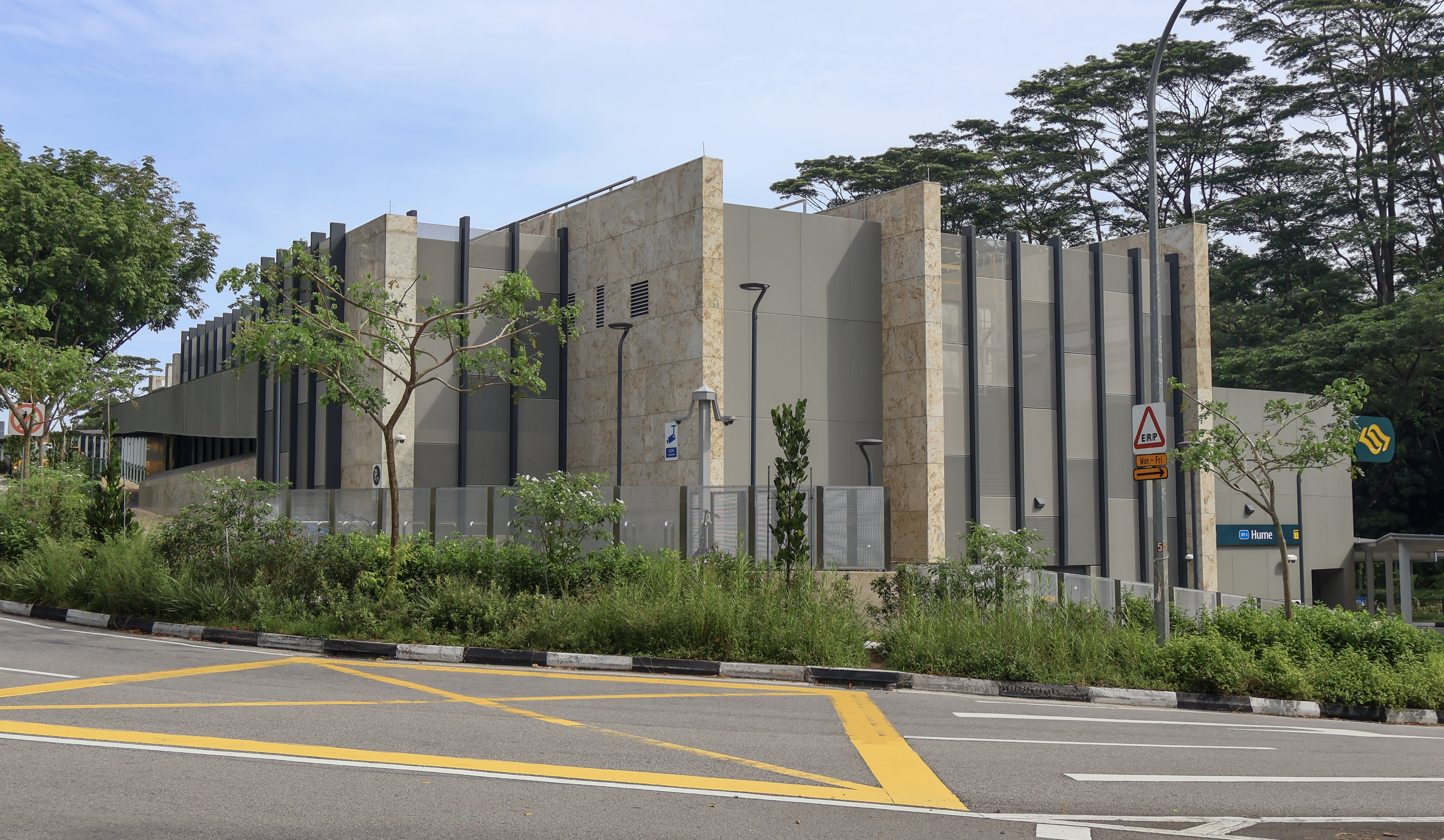
- Station exit building, with exit 1 on the right and exit 2 to the left

General information
- Location: 371 Upper Bukit Timah Road, Singapore 589681
- Coordinates: 01°21′16″N 103°46′09″E
- System: Mass Rapid Transit (MRT) station
- Owner: Land Transport Authority
- Operator: SBS Transit
- Line: Downtown Line
- Platforms: 2 (1 island platform)
- Tracks: 2
- Connections: Bus, Taxi

Construction
- Structure type: Underground
- Platform levels: 1
- Cycle facilities: Yes
- Accessible: Yes

History
- Opened: 28 February 2025; 20 months ago

Passengers
- 2025: 1,940 per day

Services
Preceding station	Mass Rapid Transit	Following station
Hillview towards Bukit Panjang	Downtown Line	Beauty World towards Expo
Track layout
Location
- Location within Singapore Rail

Hume MRT station is an underground Mass Rapid Transit (MRT) station on the Downtown Line (DTL) in Bukit Batok, Singapore. Located at the junction of Hume Avenue and Upper Bukit Timah Road, the station serves landmarks such as Bukit Timah Hill, Bukit Timah Nature Reserve, the Former Bukit Timah Fire Station, the Rail Corridor, the Rail Mall and the Former Ford Factory. It is the first underground infill station to open in Singapore.

During the construction of the DTL, only the structural provisions for the station were built due to lack of projected ridership levels. Following petitions from nearby residents advocating for the station's opening, the government announced in March 2019 that Hume station would be built in tandem with the redevelopment of the Rail Corridor.

Fitting-out works began in February 2021, and the station opened on 28 February 2025 ahead of schedule. The station features a colour scheme of green, yellow, and white. Andre Wee's Continuity, an artwork depicting the Former Ford Factory, is displayed in the station as part of the MRT network's Art-in-Transit programme.

== History ==
=== Shell station ===
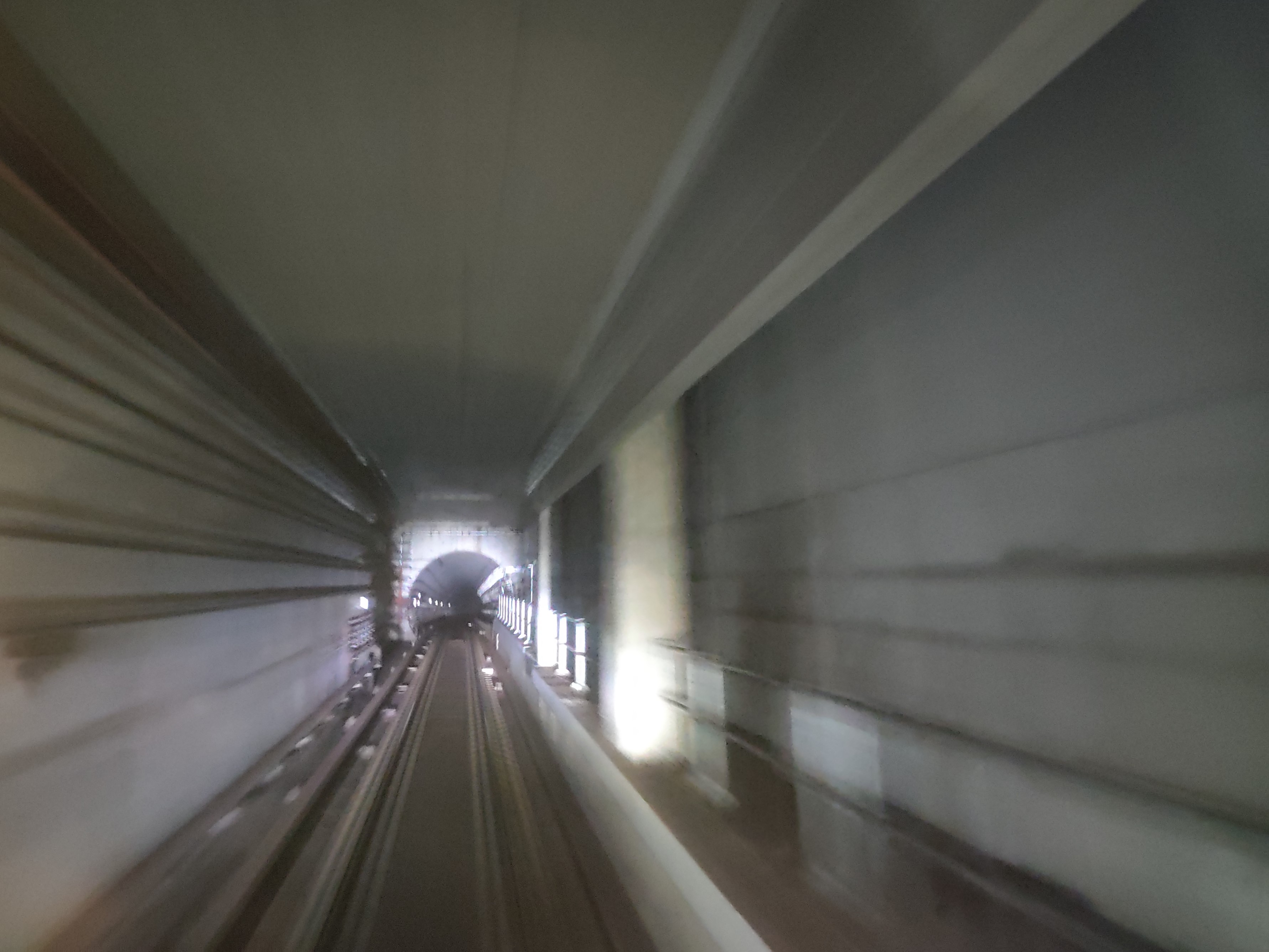
The empty shell station in the DTL tunnel in 2020

The Downtown Line (DTL) was first announced in 2007, and the stations of DTL Stage 2 were announced in July 2008. The tunnels between the Hillview and Beauty World stations were constructed by SKEC Singapore Branch as part of Contract 915, which was awarded to the company for S$225.2 million (US$202 million in 2021) in June 2009. During the construction of the DTL, only the structural provisions (the "box") for the future Hume station were built. The shell structural provisions were completed in 2014.

In 2014 and 2015, Hume residents petitioned for the station's construction to improve transport connectivity in the area, while Member of Parliament (MP) Low Yen Ling (who represented Bukit Gombak) raised the issue in March 2015 with Lui Tuck Yew, the transport minister. The Land Transport Authority (LTA), Singapore's transport agency, explained that projected ridership levels in the area did not justify the full construction of the station. The LTA also cited the availability of adequate transport alternatives in the area.

In April 2017, The Straits Times reported that construction works were still ongoing at the future station site, speculating that the station would be opened soon, but the LTA clarified that only a station box was being built at the time. Following the opening of DTL Stage 3, another resident petitioned for the station's opening.

During a parliamentary debate on the transport ministry's budget on 7 March 2019, senior minister of state for transport Janil Puthucheary announced Hume station would open in 2025. The station's opening was planned to coincide with the redevelopment of the former Bukit Timah Fire Station and the Rail Corridor. Janil also acknowledged the decision was due to Low's repeated appeals for the station's opening. Nevertheless, Hume residents interviewed by Today expressed dismay over the six-year wait for the station's opening. A veteran contractor interviewed by The Straits Times in June 2020 suggested the station retrofitting works could be completed within 1.5 years, making it possible for the station to open before 2025.

=== Station construction and opening ===
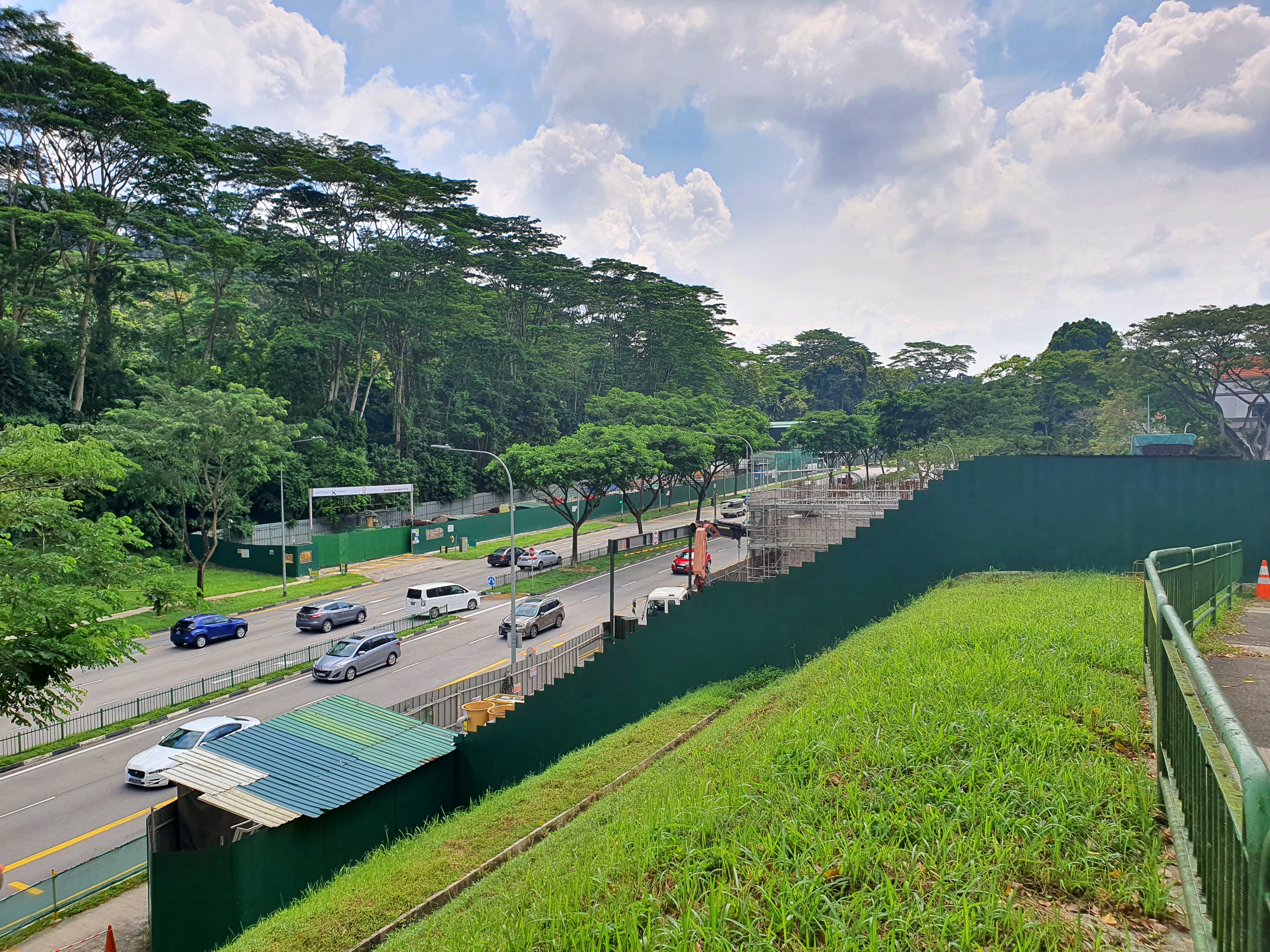
Construction of the station in 2023

The contract for completing the civil works at Hume station was awarded to JSM Construction Group Pte Ltd for S$34.338 million (US$25.2 million) on 14 January 2021. The contract included the construction of a station entrance, ventilation shaft and fitting-out works for the new station. A groundbreaking ceremony for the station's construction was held on 28 February 2021, with MP Low and health minister Gan Kim Yong in attendance. Most of the works had to be conducted during non-revenue hours at night as the station was being constructed on the operational DTL.

Without direct above-ground access, construction materials for the station had to be transported 700 m (2,300 ft) from Hillview station, while heavier materials were delivered via a special engineer's train from Gali Batu Depot. Excavators removed 2 to 3 metres (6.6 to 9.8 ft) of soil to access the shell station, parts of which were dismantled to allow entry points for workers and materials from street level. Flood barriers were installed around the station's work site. To separate the construction site from live rail operations, fire-resistant walls were installed before the station's access panels were removed. These walls also shielded the tracks from potential fires in the construction zone.

Noise and vibration monitoring instruments were also deployed to minimise inconvenience to nearby residents. Testing and integration works for critical systems, including signalling, communications, and tunnel ventilation, could only take place within limited engineering hours between 1 a.m. and 3 a.m. The installation of high-voltage and traction power equipment at the station had to be done carefully as the station is located between the operational Hillview and Beauty World stations.

In December 2024, transport minister Chee Hong Tat said the station was expected to open in the second quarter of 2025. However, on 24 January 2025, the LTA announced that the station's opening date would be shifted earlier to 28 February. Just before the station's opening on that day, The Straits Times reported that a crowd of more than 100 people were already waiting outside of the entrance. Murali Pillai, the minister of state for law and transport, officiated the opening of the station with Gan and Low in attendance. Low also credited the "patience and perseverance" of Hume residents for the station's opening.

== Details ==
Hume station serves the DTL and is situated between Hillview and Beauty World stations, with a station code of DT4. As with the rest of the DTL, it is operated by SBS Transit. The station runs alongside Upper Bukit Timah Road and Hume Avenue and has two exits serving various landmarks including the Bukit Timah Nature Reserve, the Bukit Batok Nature Park, the Former Ford Factory, The Rail Mall, and the Rail Corridor. Two bus stops and one taxi stand are accessible from Exit 1. The station is also close to various condominiums including The Hillside and Parc Palais. Trains operate in both directions every 3–5 minutes from 5:35 a.m. to 12:43 am.

Hume station is the first underground infill station in Singapore, with previously built infill stations – Canberra and Dover – being elevated rail stations. The station's interior has a colour scheme of green, yellow, and white – an homage to nearby landmarks such as the Rail Corridor, the quarries, and the Former Ford Factory. Near the station's entrances are 60 bicycle parking spots for cyclists.

The station is designed to be barrier-free with wider fare gates that allow easier access for wheelchair users into the station, and a tactile system that guides visually impaired commuters through the station. The station's lifts are also equipped with rear-panel mirrors to assist wheelchair users when reversing out. Hume station has also been awarded the Building and Construction Authority's Green Mark Gold Certification, incorporating features such as rooftop solar panels, energy-efficient lighting, and a hybrid cooling system.

=== Artwork ===
Commissioned as part of the MRT network's Art-in-Transit programme, Continuity by Andre Wee is displayed at the station. The artwork presents a stylised cross-sectional view of the nearby Former Ford Factory, a national monument which involved significant events during World War II. The depiction of the internal structure showcases the building's historical purpose while the outside presents its current function as a venue for public visits and ceremonies for National Service recruits.

Wee intended for commuters to reflect on the factory's solemn past and its ongoing role in preserving Singapore's history. To develop the artwork, he made repeated site visits to study its architecture and contemporary uses, and consulted archival material to recreate its historical appearance. The artist was inspired by retro simulation games such as SimCity and The Sims for his isometric illustrations, and the work took slightly more than six months to complete. He later described it as rewarding to see visitors engage with the artwork, particularly after the station's opening.

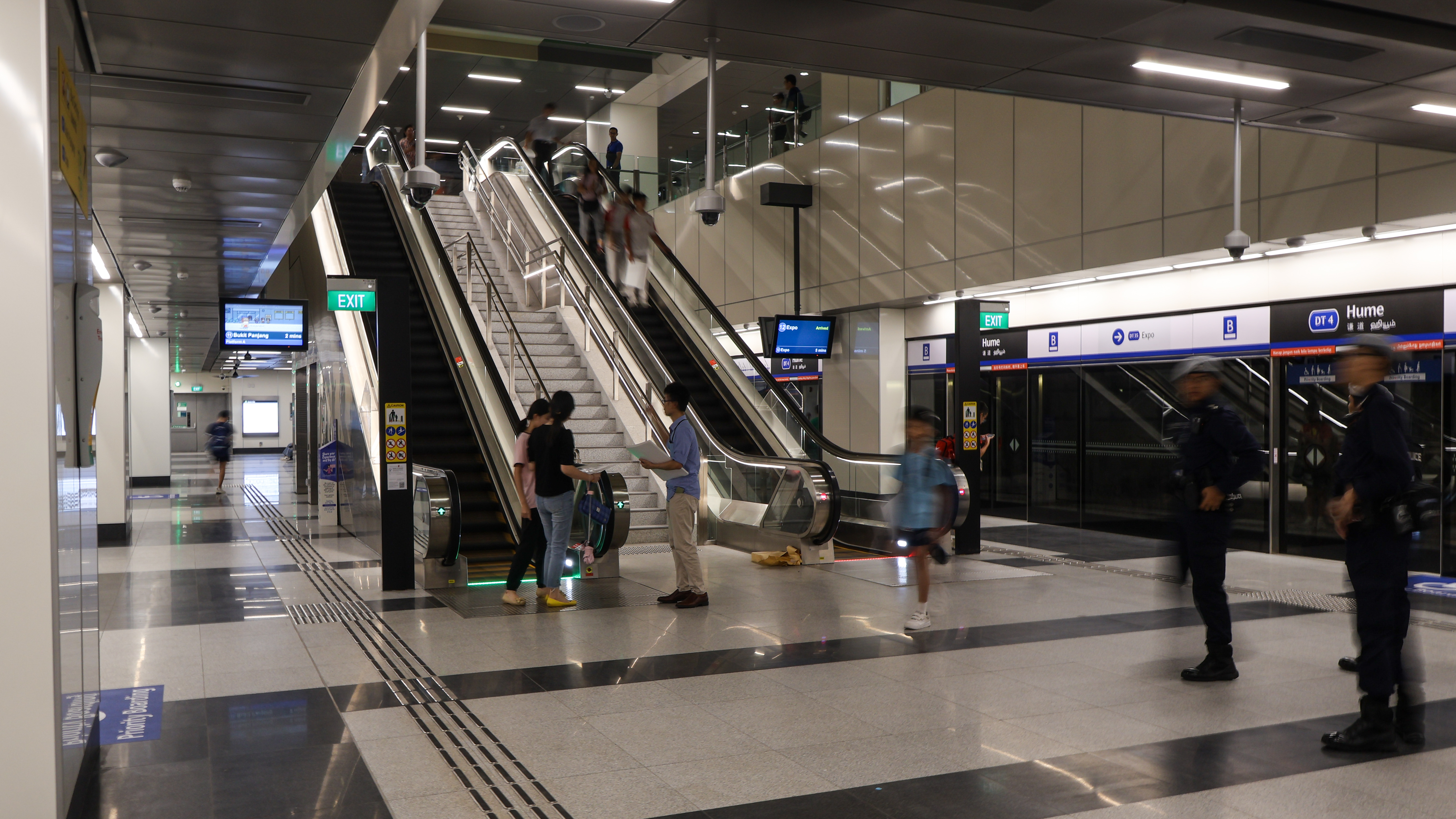
The completed station platforms on the opening day

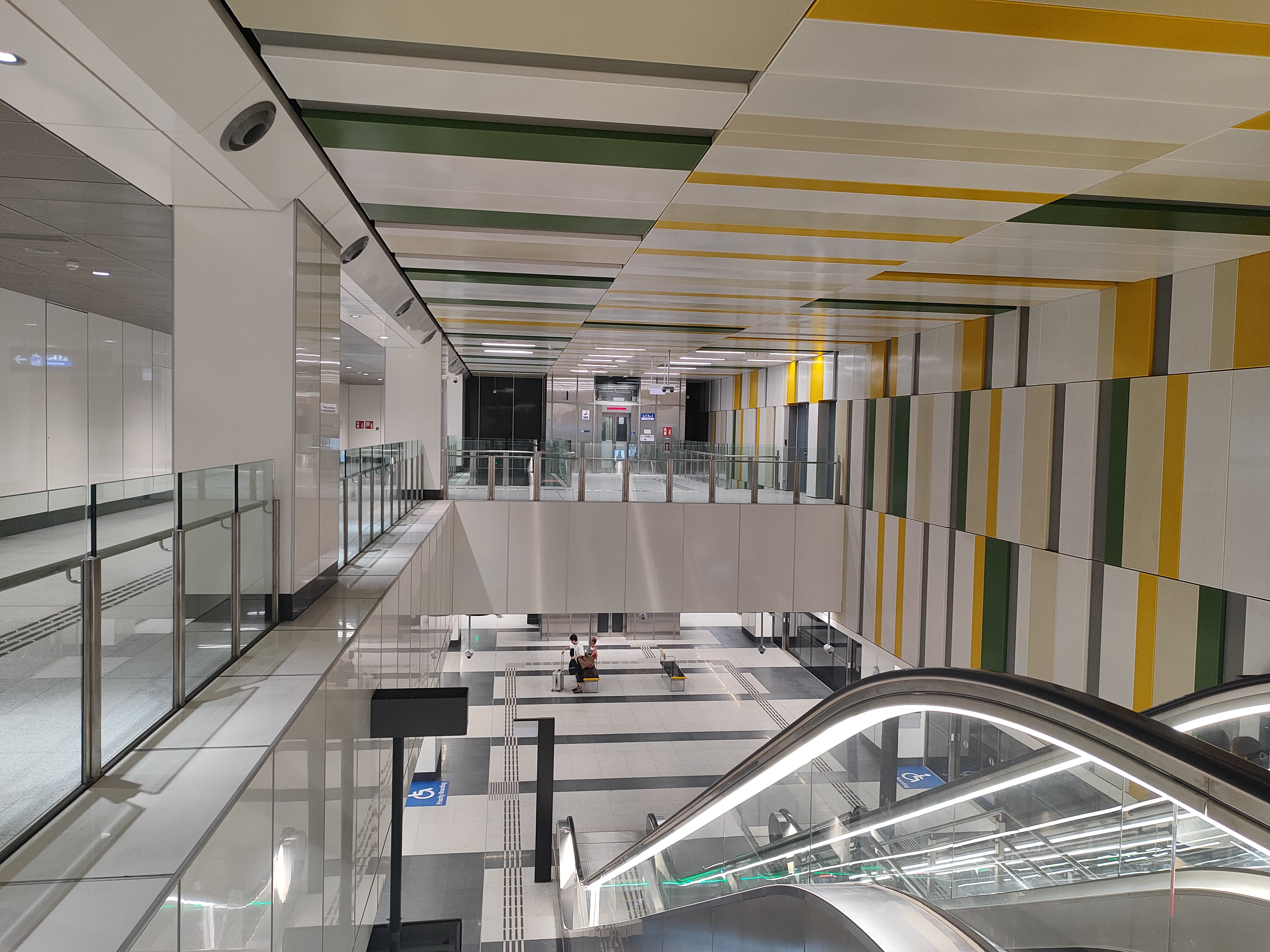
The station interior has a colour scheme of green, yellow, and white.
