= Former Bukit Timah Fire Station =

Building in Bukit Timah, Singapore

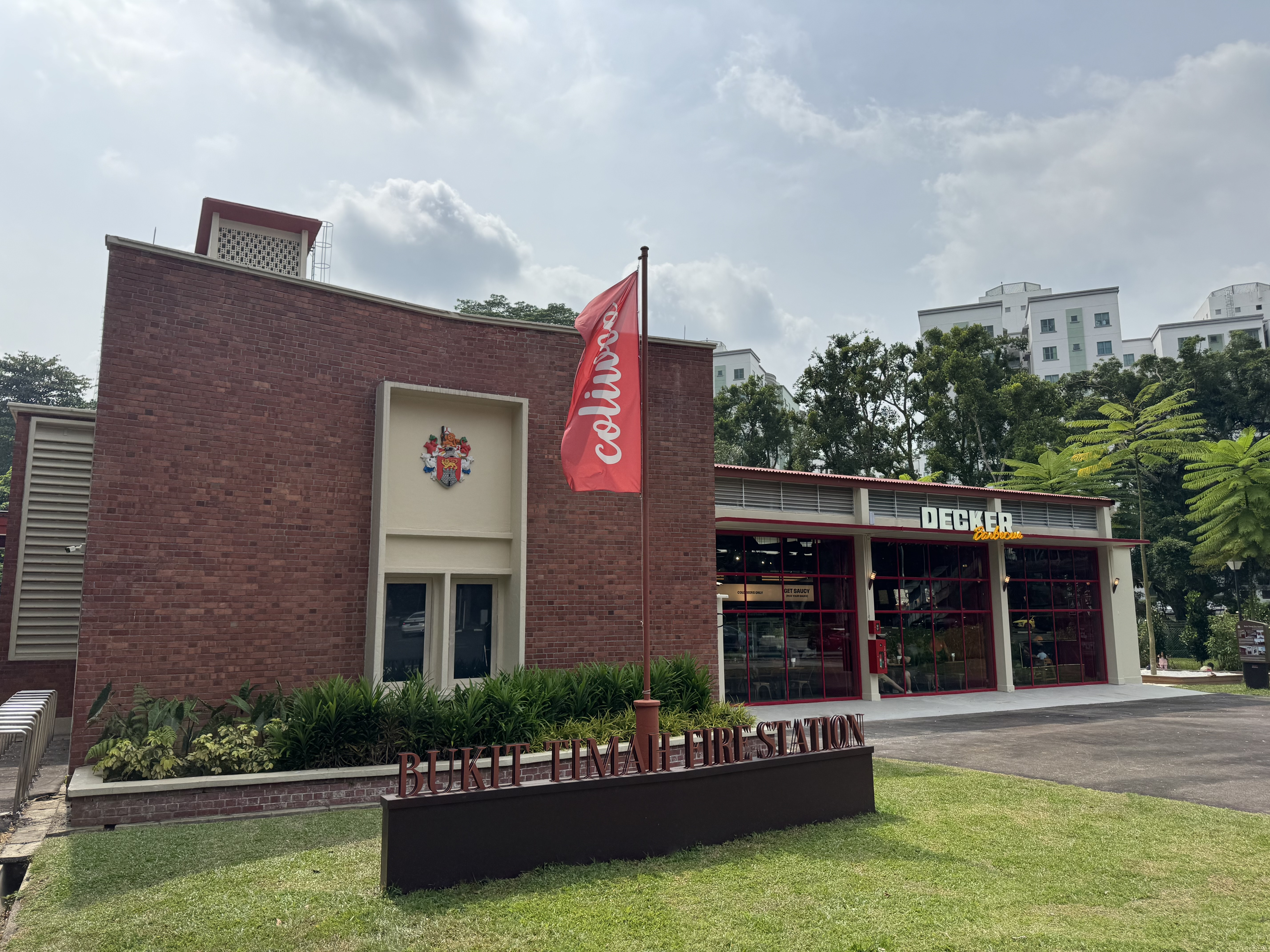
- Bukit Timah Fire Station in 2026
- Alternative names: Old Bukit Timah Fire Station; Bukit Timah Fire Station

General information
- Architectural style: Modern
- Location: Upper Bukit Timah Road, Singapore, 260 Upper Bukit Timah Road, Singapore 588190, Singapore
- Coordinates: 1.3491°N 103.7707°E
- Opened: 25 October 1956; 70 years ago
- Renovated: 2025; 1 year ago

Technical details
- Grounds: 0.86 hectares

Other information
- Public transit: DT4 Hume

The Former Bukit Timah Fire Station, also known as the Old Bukit Timah Fire Station or the Bukit Timah Fire Station, is a former fire station located at Upper Bukit Timah Road, Singapore. It is planned to be redesigned into a community centre for nature. Bukit Timah Fire Station is located nearby other heritage sites in Bukit Timah such as the Former Ford Factory, Bukit Timah Nature Reserve, and the Bukit Timah Memorial, all of which are served by Hume MRT station.

== Description ==
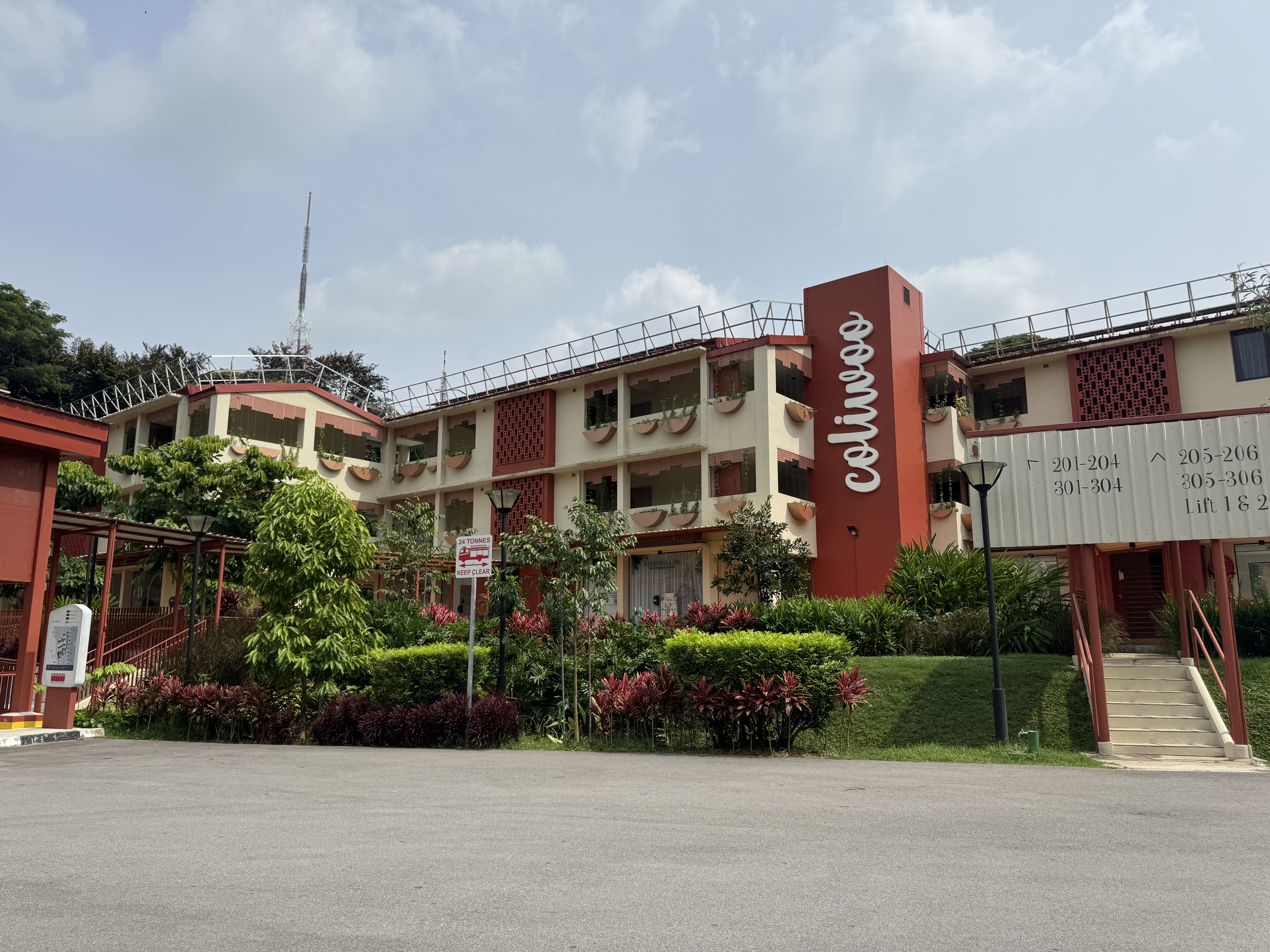
Blocks beside the main station for staff use, redeveloped into residential areas

Bukit Timah Fire Station is located at the junction of Upper Bukit Timah Road and Old Jurong Road. Bukit Timah Fire Station has several blocks for staff use beside the main station which features a watch tower.

== History ==
Bukit Timah Fire Station was built and opened on 25 October 1956 as one of 3 fire stations post-World War II built by the Singapore Fire Brigade. Plans to build a fire station in Bukit Timah were announced in 1954 as it was an industrial area and would provide fire protection.

Bukit Timah Fire Station ceased operations in 2005 and was leased for community and dining uses. Most of the tenant's leases expired in 2020. In 2019, Bukit Timah Fire Station was gazetted for conservation.

In 2021, Homestead Holland Pte Ltd would be redesigning Bukit Timah Fire Station after winning the C40 Cities Climate Leadership Group's ‘Reinventing Cities’ competition in collaboration with the Singapore Land Authority (SLA), National Parks Board (NParks), Building and Construction Authority (BCA), and the Urban Redevelopment Authority (URA).

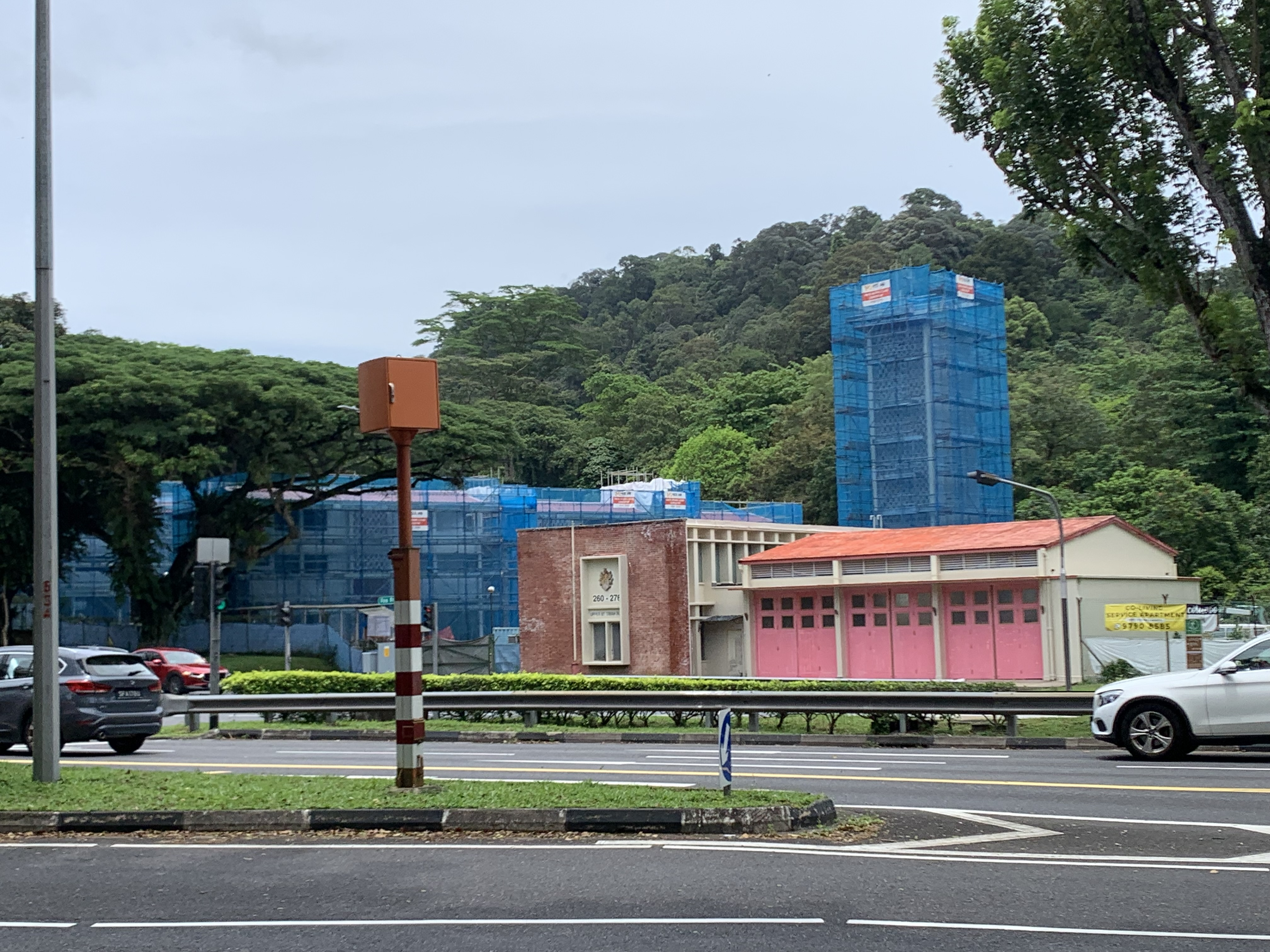
The Bukit Timah Fire Station under renovation in 2025

Minister of National Development, Desmond Lee, noted plans to connect Bukit Timah Fire Station to the Rail Corridor and the Bukit Batok Nature Reserve. In 2022, Homestead Holland Pte Ltd pulled out of the project, stating COVID-19 as a challenge. In 2023, SLA and URA called for a new tender for Bukit Timah Fire Station to continue the project and was expected to be awarded in January 2024.

On 9 April 2024, LHN Facilities Management announced that they would be redeveloping Bukit Timah Fire Station. They plan to build a residential apartment at the former facility under its new entity Coliwoo, which opened in 2025.
