= Bukit Timah Road =

Road in Singapore

Coordinates: 1.3228°N 103.8129°E

Bukit Timah Road and Upper Bukit Timah Road
- Jalan Bukit Timah (Malay) 武吉知马路 (Chinese) புக்கித் திமா சாலை (Tamil)
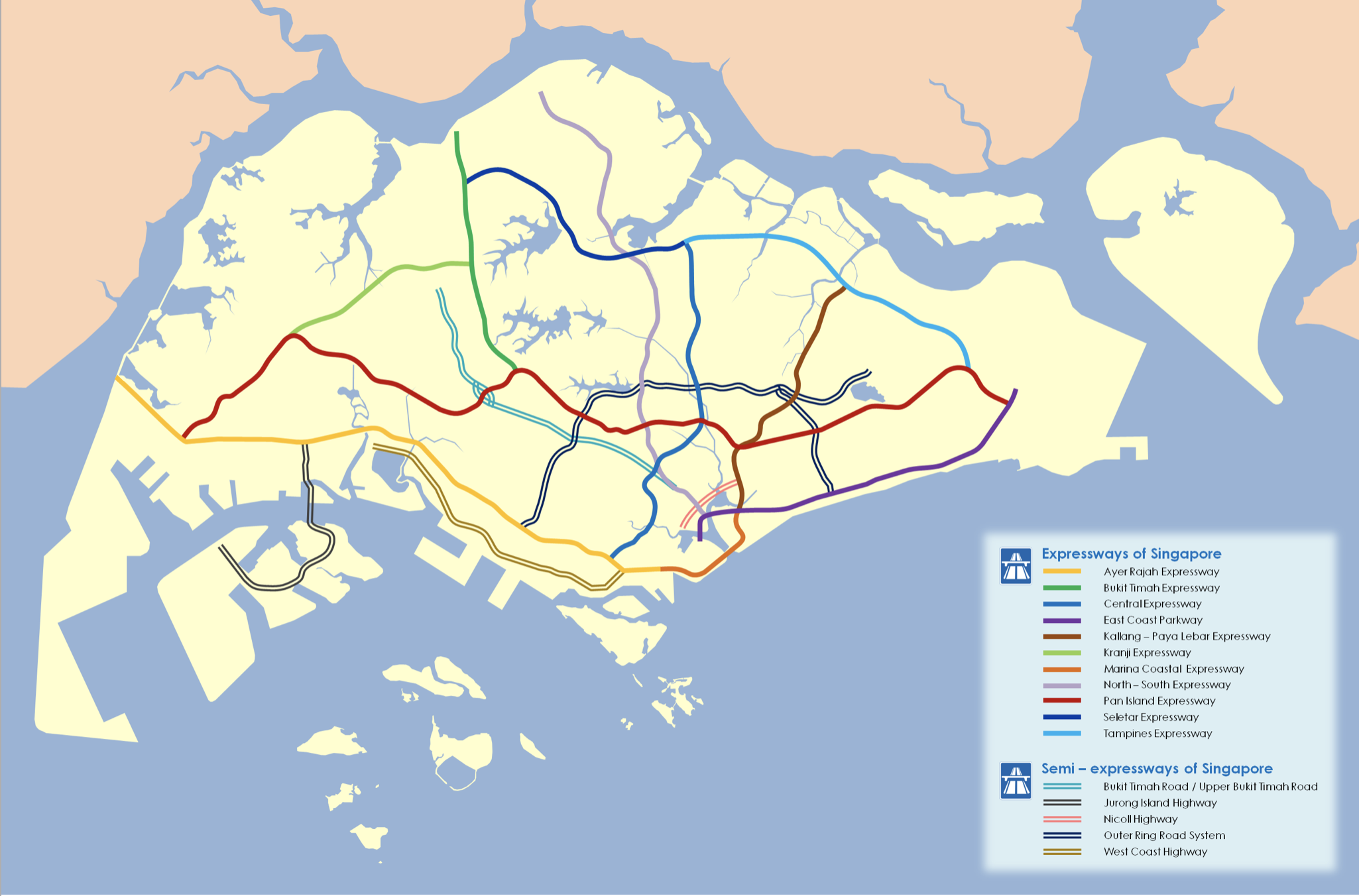
- Bukit Timah Road is shown as a double light blue line

Route information
- Length: 25 km (16 mi)
- Existed: 1845–present

Major junctions
- North end: Bukit Panjang
- PIE, ORRS (Adam Road), CTE, NSE
- South end: Little India, Kallang

Location
- Country: Singapore

Highway system
- Expressways of Singapore

Bukit Timah Road (Chinese: 武吉知马路; Malay: Jalan Bukit Timah; Tamil: புக்கித் திமா சாலை) is a major road in Singapore extending from the city centre to Woodlands Road on the way to Johor Bahru in Malaysia. The road's 25-km (15.5 miles) length makes it one of the longest roads in Singapore, and the road takes its name from Bukit Timah Hill. En route, it passes through the areas of Little India, Newton Road, Farrer Road, Singapore Botanic Gardens, Bukit Timah and Bukit Panjang.

Bukit Timah Road splits into two roads at Newton Circus, the west-bound Bukit Timah Road and east-bound Dunearn Road, both of which straddle a canal along their entire lengths. Bukit Timah Road begins at the junction with Rochor Canal Road, Serangoon Road and Selegie Road just south of Tekka Centre as Bukit Timah Road, follows a canal in a northwest direction up to its junction with Clementi Road where it continues northwards as Upper Bukit Timah Road (Chinese: 武吉知马路上段) until the junction with Bukit Panjang Road and Choa Chu Kang Road near the Ten Mile Junction shopping mall then continues as Woodlands Road. The road passes through the Bukit Timah Planning Area. Buildings named after the road are Bukit Timah Plaza and Bukit Timah Shopping Centre.

== Etymology ==
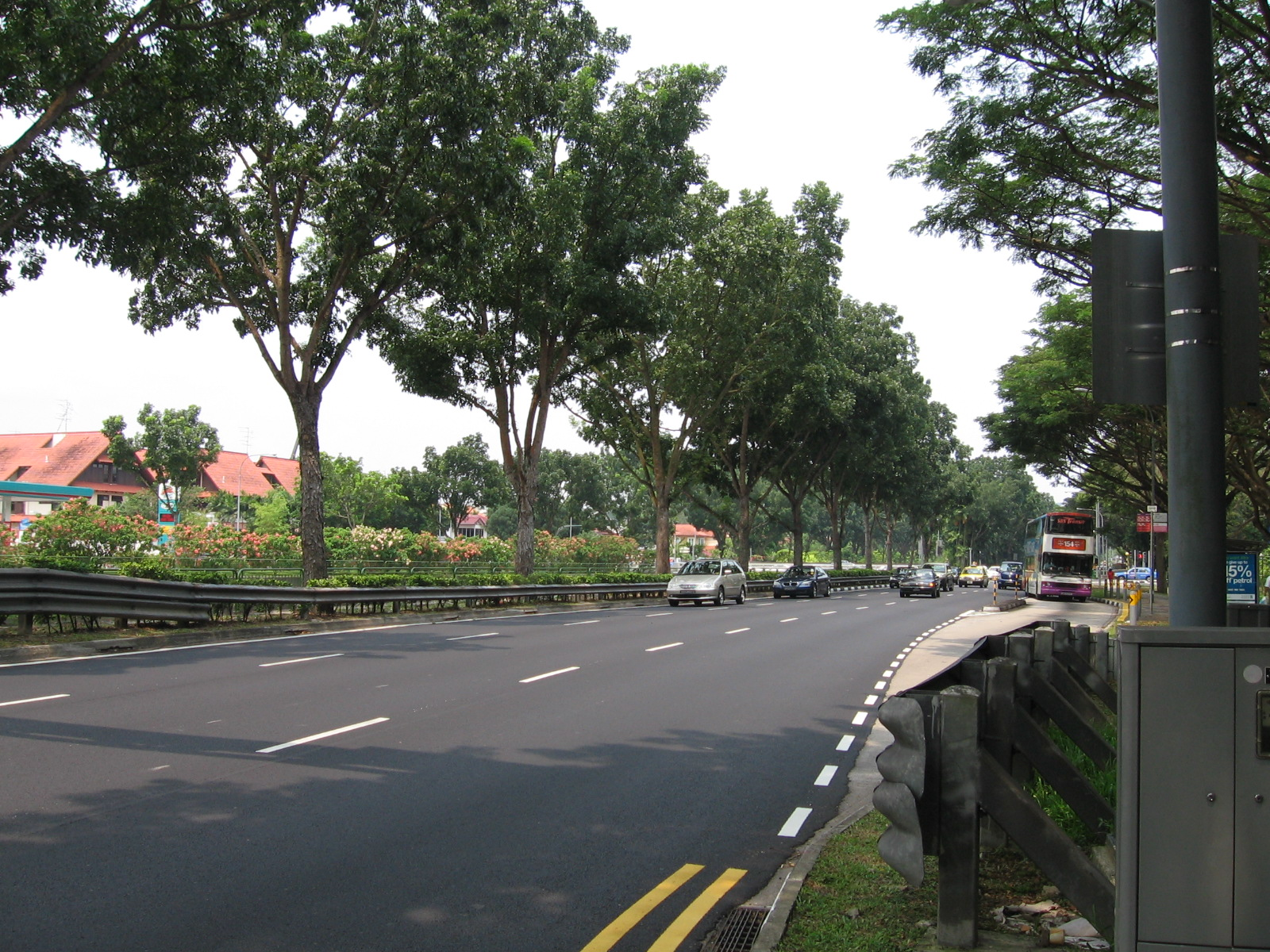
Bukit Timah Road westbound towards Bukit Timah, near the Singapore Botanic Gardens.

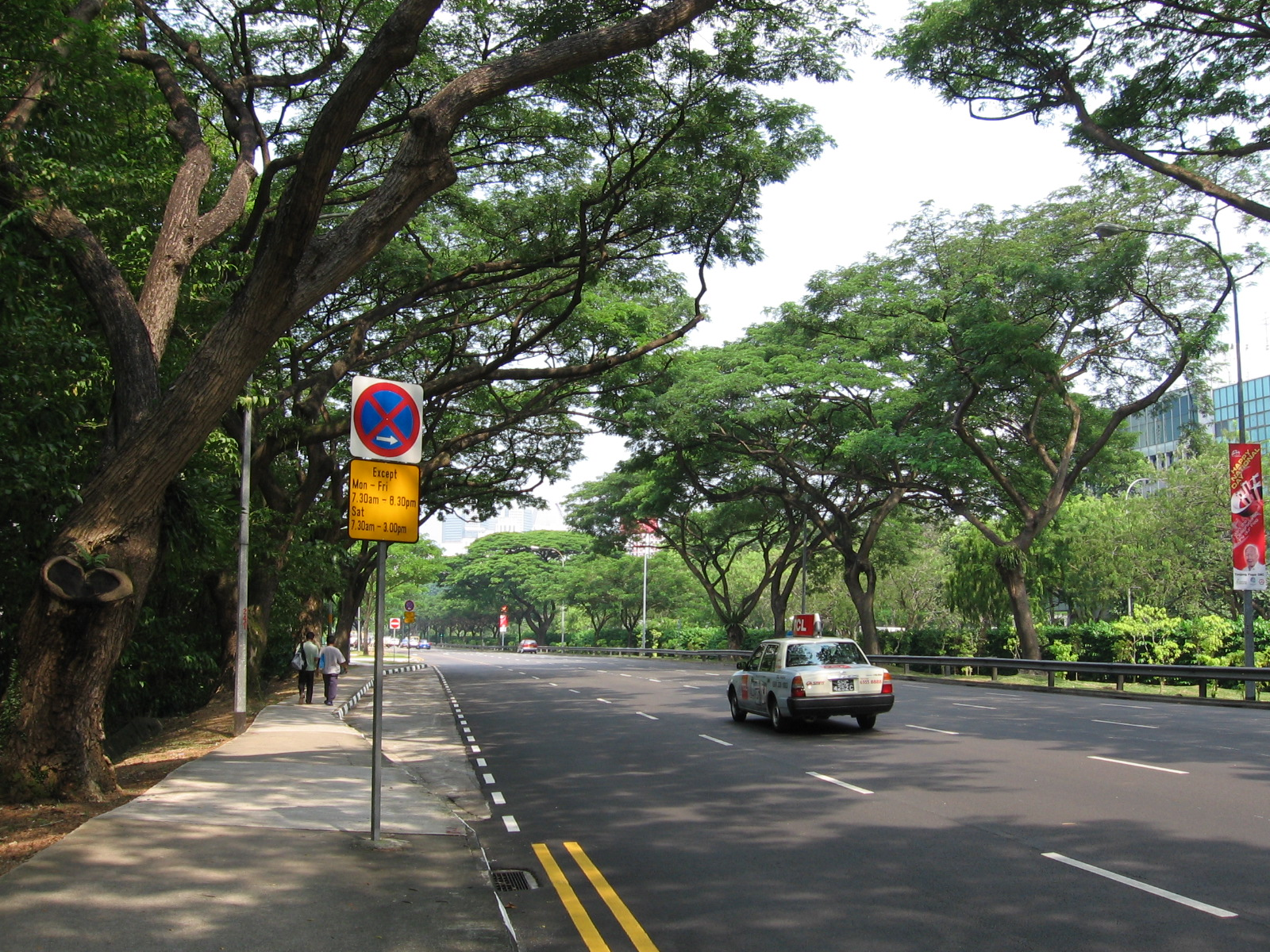
Dunearn Road, eastbound towards the city.

"Bukit Timah" in Malay means "tin bearing hill".

== History ==
The British surrendered to the Japanese at the Old Ford Motor Factory at Upper Bukit Timah Road. A canal was built in later years between Dunearn Road and Bukit Timah Road to solve the flooding problem in the area. In the 1990s, a tunnel and a flyover was constructed namely the Bukit Timah Underpass and the Wayang Satu Flyover in order to improve traffic flow. The Newton Flyover was built in the 1970s which goes over the junction of Newton Circus becoming the first ever Semi-Expressway standalone road, that features both the underpass and flyover without changing any direction.

== Landmarks ==
The Downtown MRT line was built parallel to the road, with stations at King Albert Park, Sixth Avenue, Tan Kah Kee, Botanic Gardens, Stevens, Newton, and Little India.

Along the road, major landmarks include Anglo-Chinese School (Barker Road), Balmoral Plaza, Coronation Plaza, Hwa Chong Institution, Kandang Kerbau Women's and Children's Hospital, Kampong Java Park, King Albert Park, Hwa Chong International School, Methodist Girls' School, National Junior College, Nanyang Girls' High School, Newton Food Centre, Singapore Botanic Gardens, Singapore Institute of Management, Tekka Centre and Ngee Ann Polytechnic at the junction of Clementi Road and Upper Bukit Timah Road.

At Upper Bukit Timah Road, landmarks include Bukit Timah Plaza, Bukit Timah Market and Food Centre, Beauty World, Cheong Chin Nam Road, Hoover Park, The Rail Mall, Former Bukit Timah Fire Station, Saint Joseph's Church, Bukit Timah, and the Old Ford Motor Factory.

== Businesses and organisations ==
Businesses and organisations located along Bukit Timah Road include:

- Blade Club, a fencing club
