= The Rail Mall =

Strip mall in Bukit Timah, Singapore

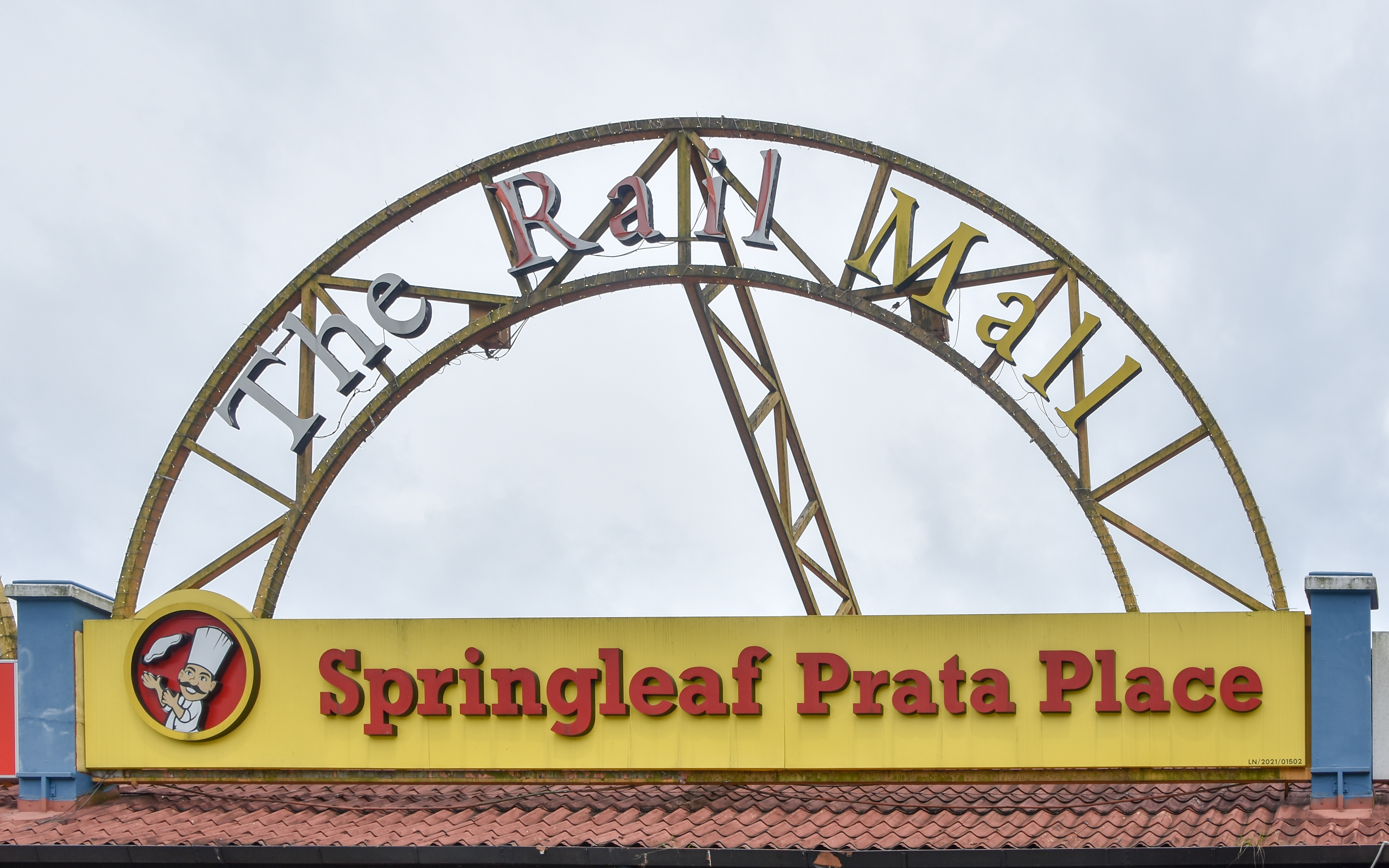
- The Rail Mall sign by Timothy A. Gonsalves, 2023
- Coordinates: 1.3582°N 103.7678°E
- Address: Upper Bukit Timah Road, #380 Fuyong Estate, Singapore 678040
- Opened: 1994; 32 years ago
- Owner: Paragon REIT
- Architect: Singapore Engineers
- Num. of stores: 43
- Floors: 1
- Parking: 95
- Public transit: DT3 Hillview (Note: Northern portion); DT4 Hume (Note: Southern portion)
- Website: railmall.com.sg

The Rail Mall, or just Rail Mall, is a strip mall located at Upper Bukit Timah Road, Singapore. The Rail Mall is located nearby the Rail Corridor and the Bukit Timah Nature Reserve.

== History ==
In 1994, Lee Rubber subsidiary, Singapore Engineers, spent S$5.00 million to renovate it and turn it into a neighbourhood centre. In 2008, The Rail Mall was revamped again to try to position it as a food and lifestyle hub for the West. In 2018, The Rail Mall was put up for sale and SPH Reit had agreed to purchase The Rail Mall for S$63.24 million.

In 2019, The Rail Mall commissioned Singaporean freelance artist, Yip Yew Chong, to paint a wall mural on the entrance of the strip. The mural features the last wild tiger shot in Singapore and the Keretapi Tanah Melayu (KTM), the last train to enter Singapore through the old railway station. In 2024, Paragon REIT, a branch of SPH, divested the Rail Mall to a private investor for S$78.5 million. The divestment was completed sometime in the second half of 2024.

== Description ==
=== Stores and services ===
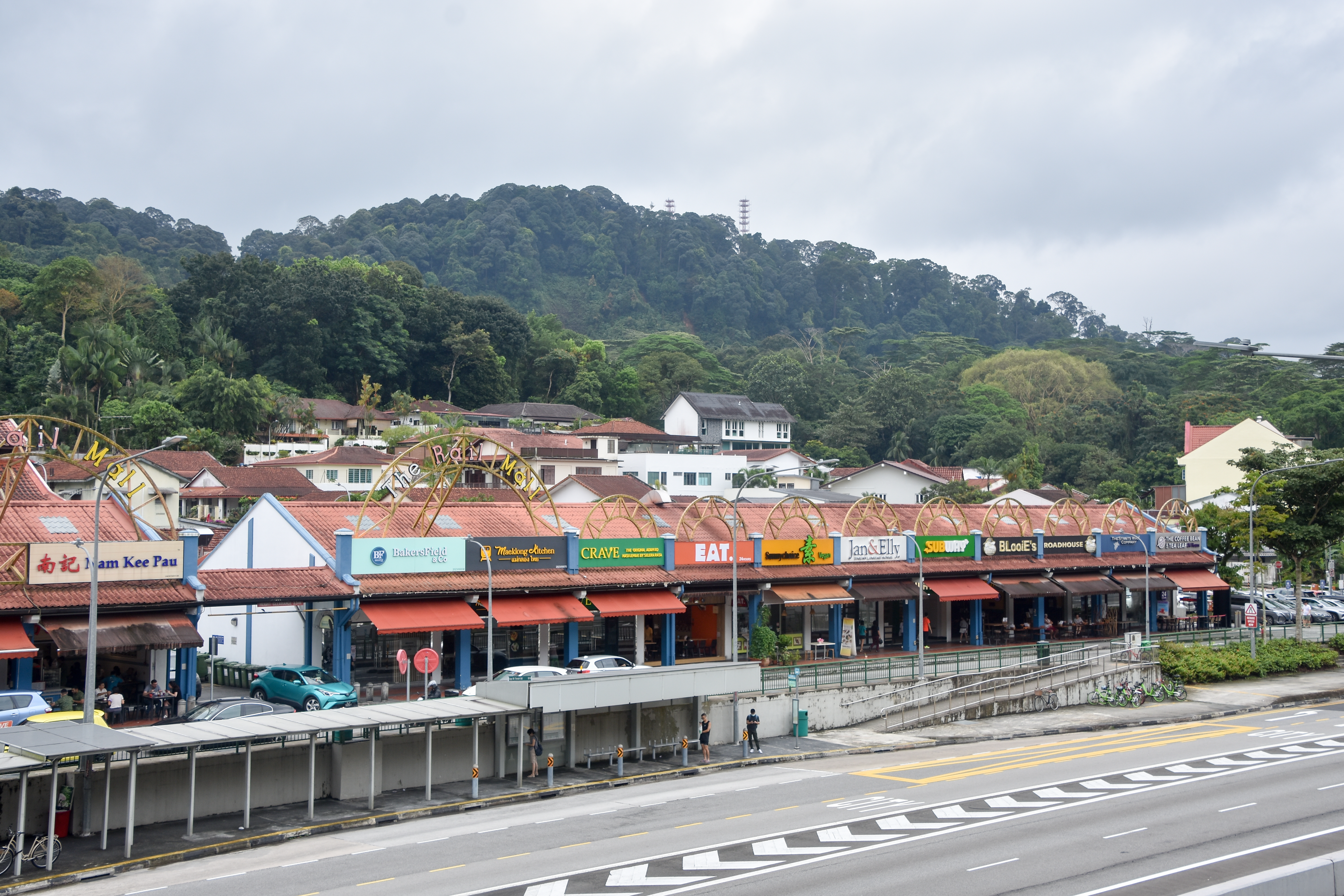
The Rail Mall in 2023

The Rail Mall has a Cold Storage, The Coffee Bean & Tea Leaf (24-hours), Popeyes (24-hours), Guzman y Gomez, Starbucks, Subway, and a Toast Box along with some restaurants of local and international cuisines as well as tuition agencies.

=== Mural ===
The Rail Mall has a wall mural on its entrance, it features the last wild tiger shot in October 1930, gambier and pepper plantations, and the number 6543 to represent the last KTM train and locomotive (YDM-4) to enter Singapore through the old railway station. Yip Yew Chong stated that the mural was to, "educate the young and create the nostalgic feel for the elders".
