= Blade Club =

Blade Club (Fencing) Singapore is a commercial fencing club in Singapore. Founded 2005 by Henry Koh, a former national fencer for Singapore. The club teaches fencing students at all levels, from beginner to advanced fencing in group or individual lesson formats.

According to the Club website, the mission of the Blade Club is to help develop fencing in Singapore, focusing on helping students to learn fencing well and to achieve success in competitive fencing. Blade Club has classes for all three weapons in fencing: foil, epee, and sabre. The Club is located along Bukit Timah Road, Singapore.

== Fencing results and rankings ==
Blade Club is the current winner of the Fencing Singapore Challenge Trophy/Champion's Cup, having won 3 Golds and 3 Silvers at the 2008 Pesta Sukan competition held in Singapore. The Trophy is awarded to the club that wins the most number of medals during the competition. The Club also won in 2007, when the Trophy was first introduced.

Blade Club fencers have made some of the top spots in the Singapore National Team.
