= Former Ford Factory =

National monument in Singapore

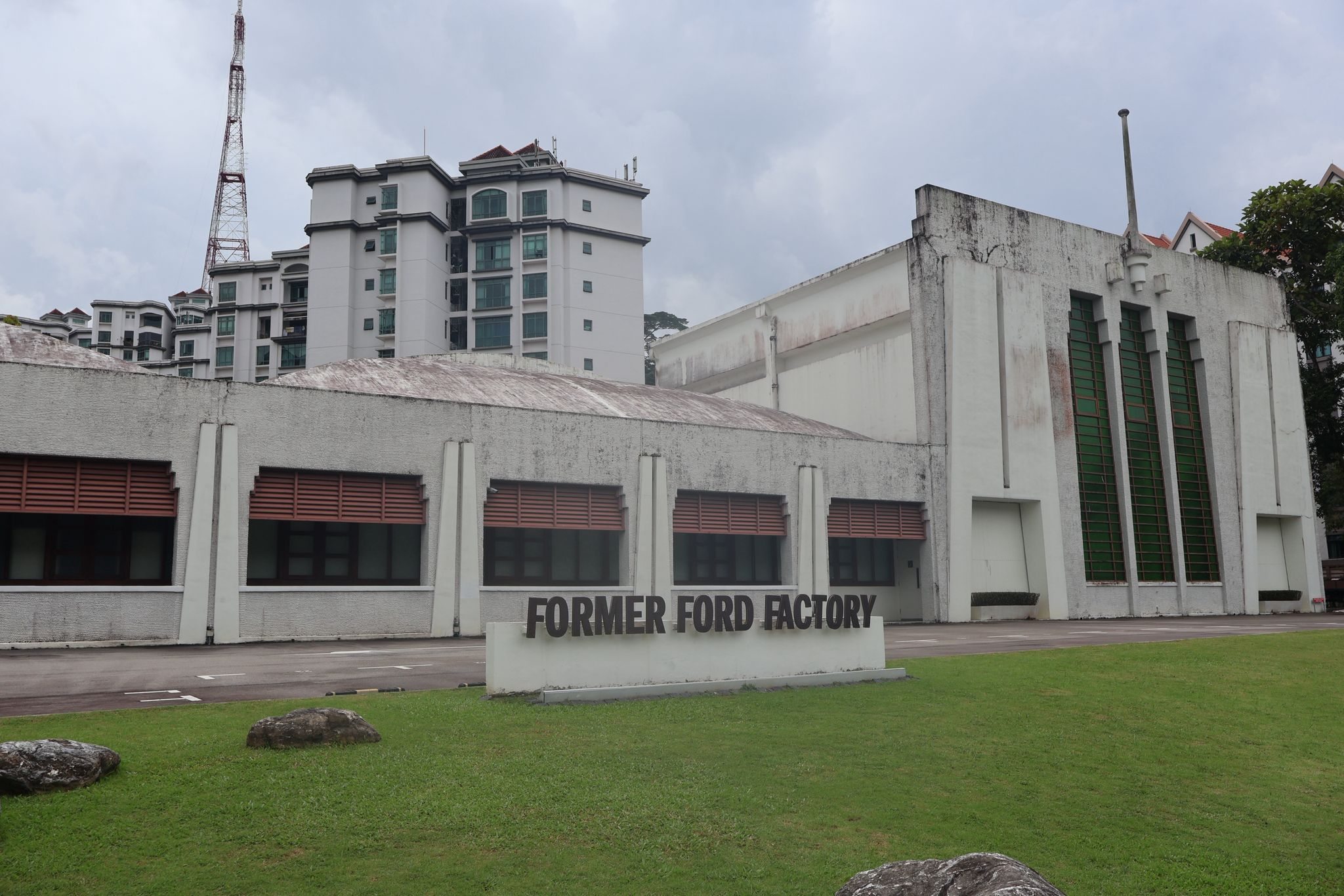
- Former Ford Factory in 2025

- Location within Singapore
- Alternative names: Old Ford Factory; Old Ford Motor Factory; Hong Leong Industries Building; Temporarily named as "Syonan Gallery"

General information
- Architectural style: Art Deco
- Location: Bukit Timah, Singapore, 351 Upper Bukit Timah Road, Singapore 588192, Singapore
- Coordinates: 1°21′10″N 103°46′08″E
- Named for: Ford
- Opened: October 1941
- Owner: Ford Motor Company of Malaya (former); National Archives of Singapore
- Affiliation: National Archives of Singapore

Design and construction
- Architect: Emile Brizay
- Known for: a venue in Singapore where the British officially surrendered Singapore to the Japanese during World War II in 15 February 1942

Other information
- Public transit: DT4 Hume

National monument of Singapore
- Designated: 15 February 2006; 20 years ago
- Reference no.: 55

The Former Ford Factory, also known as the Old Ford Motor Factory and Old Ford Factory depending on sources, is a heritage gallery located along Upper Bukit Timah Road in Bukit Timah, Singapore. It is the place where the British Army forces surrendered to Imperial Japanese Army forces on 15 February 1942 after the Battle of Singapore. The Former Ford Factory had since been gazetted as a National Monument in 2006, and converted into an exhibition gallery and archive named Memories at Old Ford Factory. The permanent exhibition gallery showcases life in Singapore under Japanese wartime rule, and the exhibition is one of the continuation of final battles from Pasir Panjang and at Fort Siloso.

== History ==
The factory was established and built for the Ford Motor Company of Malaya (also known as Ford Malaya in short) in October 1941 and possessed an Art Deco-style façade, which was typical of most buildings and structures, both public and private, of that era, and became Ford's first motor-car and vehicle assembly and construction plant in the region of Southeast Asia.

During the Malayan Campaign of World War II starting from December 1941, the factory's modern and state-of-the-art assembly equipment was taken over and used by the British Royal Air Force (RAF) to assemble fighter aircraft for defending Allied air forces in the region, aside from the RAF. The fighter planes, most of which were of American origin (such as the Brewster Buffalo), came in individual break-down parts that were shipped to Singapore in large wooden crates. However, most of the aircraft constructed at the factory never fulfilled their intended purpose of defending British Malaya as well as their main stronghold of Singapore. They were all gradually flown out of Singapore towards the end of January 1942 when the prospects for Singapore's defense against the Japanese military's conquest looked bleak and grim. Many battles and skirmishes were fought between the British Army forces and the Imperial Japanese Army forces around the areas of the Ford Motor Factory in Bukit Panjang, Choa Chu Kang, Hillview, Bukit Batok and Bukit Timah.

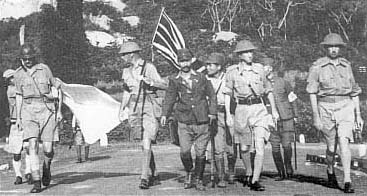
Lieutenant-General Arthur Percival, led by Lieutenant-Colonel Ichiji Sugita, marches under a flag of truce on the driveway towards the Ford Motor Factory to negotiate the capitulation of British forces in Singapore on 15 February 1942.

The factory was subsequently taken over by the Japanese forces and used as its military headquarters for commanding all of its forces in both the recently captured Malaya as well as Singapore. Following the Battle of Singapore, it is the place where British forces under Lieutenant-General Arthur Percival surrendered to Japanese forces under Lieutenant-General Yamashita Tomoyuki on 15 February 1942. The Imperial Japanese Army would later relocate its headquarters from the motor plant to Raffles College along Bukit Timah Road.

During the Japanese occupation of Singapore from 1942 to 1945, the factory was designated as a butai, or a Japanese-run facility. Nissan, which was then a prominent zaibatsu, or a vertically-integrated monopoly, took over the entire plant to assemble trucks and other motor vehicles for the Japanese military based in Malaya and Singapore as well as abroad elsewhere, such as in its various occupied territories in the Asia-Pacific region.

Following the Japanese surrender in August 1945, the Ford Motor Factory became a repair depot for British military vehicles. Normal business operations under Ford were resumed in 1947. Between 1947 and 1980, the plant continued to produce cars and vehicles, including parts and equipment such as tires and engine components for the local as well as regional markets. The Ford Factory closed its doors permanently in June 1980, and moved its operations to Regent Motors (Ford Service Centre) at Alexandra Road. The factory was converted into a warehouse storage facility. In 1983, Hong Leong Group acquired the site and the art deco building was renamed Hong Leong Industries Building for a while before it was decommissioned again in the 1990s. The rear portion of the former Ford Factory was demolished and became a condominium known as The Hillside, which was built in 1998.

Just after the Cold War, several horror stories connected to the old factory began circulating amongst the local population, mostly centered on the periods of the end of British colonial rule over the island in February 1942 and the subsequent Japanese occupation of Singapore and its end in 1945. Such paranormal tales include the presence of ghosts of former Japanese personnel and troops once stationed at the motor plant, some of whom also committed suicide at the factory following their country's surrender at the end of WWII, and the sightings and sounds of supernatural activities at the locked-up premises, such as the supposed playing of old Japanese music and songs dating back to the 1930s and 1940s and alleged sightings of restless, perhaps sometimes even hostile and malevolent, spirits roaming around the old factory's buildings.

Plans for the conversion of the old Ford Factory into a war museum similar to the Imperial War Museum began after the 9/11 terrorist attacks. The announcement was made in December 2002, with the renovation project costing S$10 million. After the 7 July 2005 London bombings, both the Preservation of Sites and Monuments (PSM) and the Singapore government jointly announced the preservation of the site as a National monument on the 64th anniversary of the British surrender of Singapore and its subsequent fall to Imperial Japan on 15 February 1942. The site was gazetted on 15 February 2006. During the renovation, the front facade and building were preserved to a moderate depth. While the building facade was retained to look as it was first completed in 1941, other rooms remain the same. One example is the boardroom where the surrender took place, which contains a replica of the original table, the clock set at the exact time of the surrender, and a map of Malaya during the war. There is a large modern structure at street level south of the factory building where visitors can enter and have a walk either up the hill or through the building to the factory area. The museum is also dedicated to the entire history of the Ford Factory, together with the events in World War II, including wartime crops and food rationing. It is also one of the principal markers for the Bukit Timah KTM corridor and the now-Downtown MRT line Stage 2, the others include Beauty World (Seventh Mile) and Bukit Panjang (Tenth Mile).

Originally named Memories at Old Ford Factory, it was closed for renovations in 2016, and was known as Syonan Gallery: War and its Legacies, which was dropped due to the public outcry for the use of the Japanese word Syonan, which was the name the Japanese used to refer to Singapore. It was renamed Surviving the Japanese Occupation: War and Its Legacies on 15 February 2017, by Minister for Communications and Information Yaacob Ibrahim.

== Gallery ==
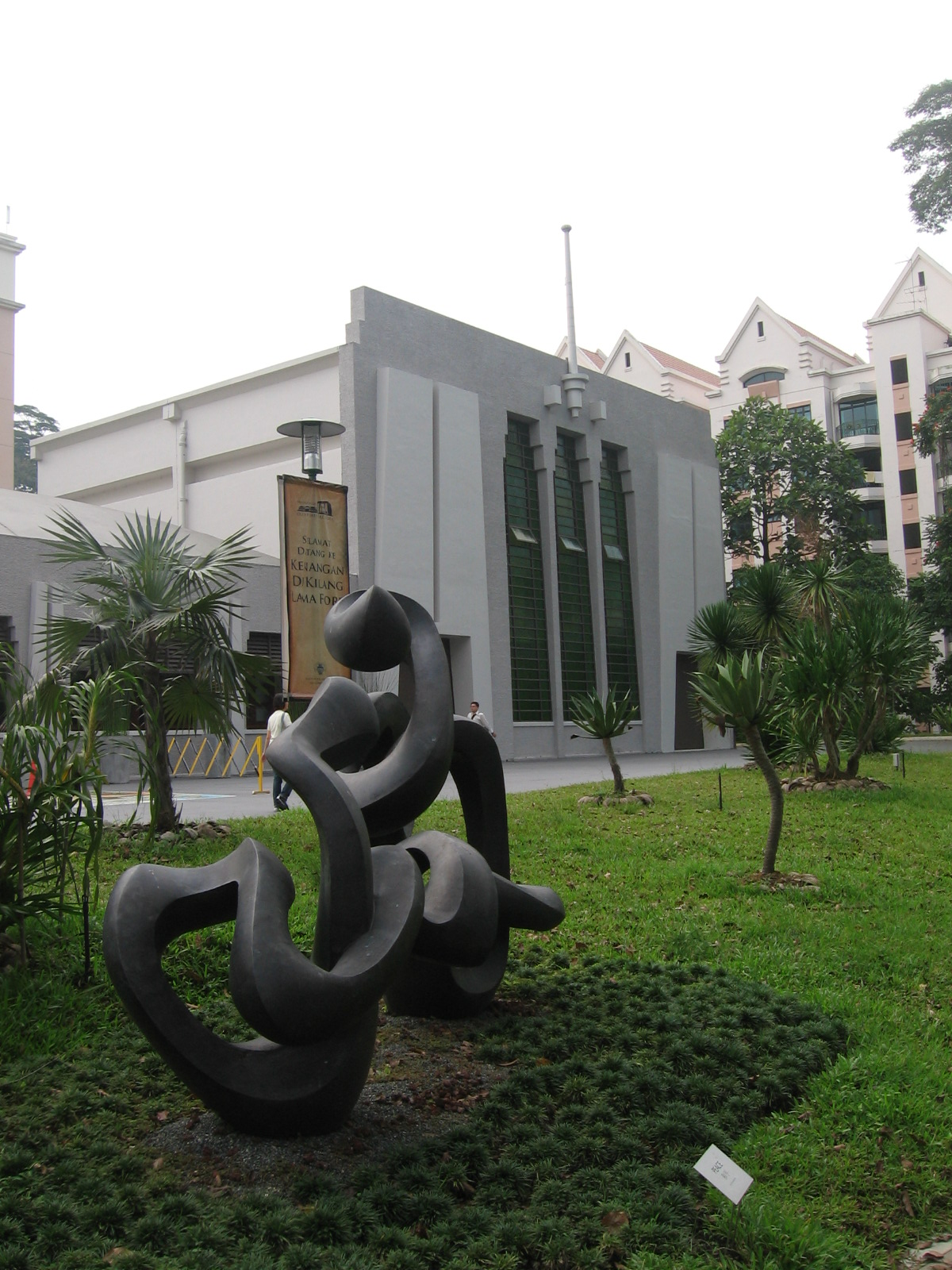
In the foreground is a calligraphic sculpture titled He Ping (和平), Chinese for "peace", by Singaporean artist Chua Boon Kee.

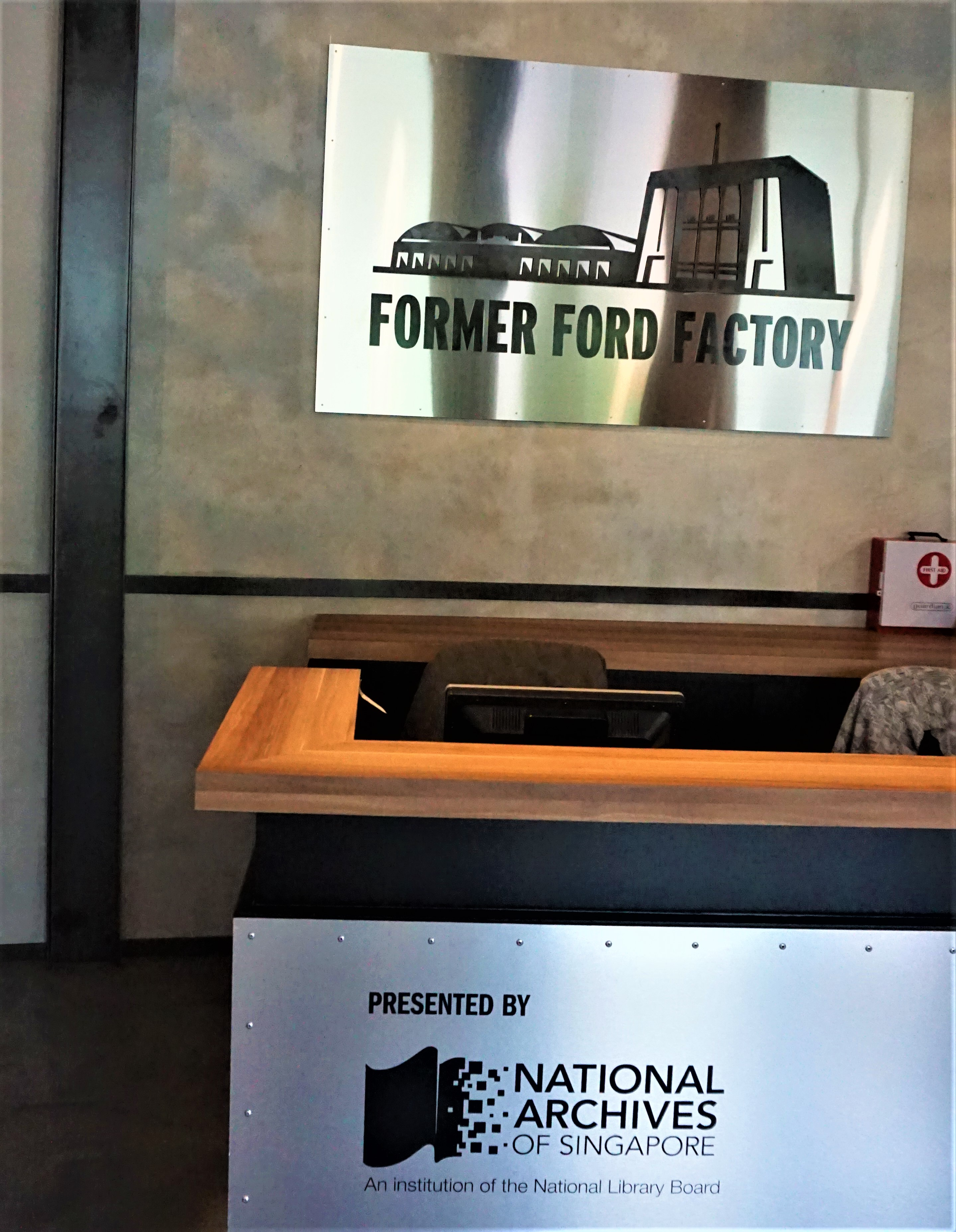

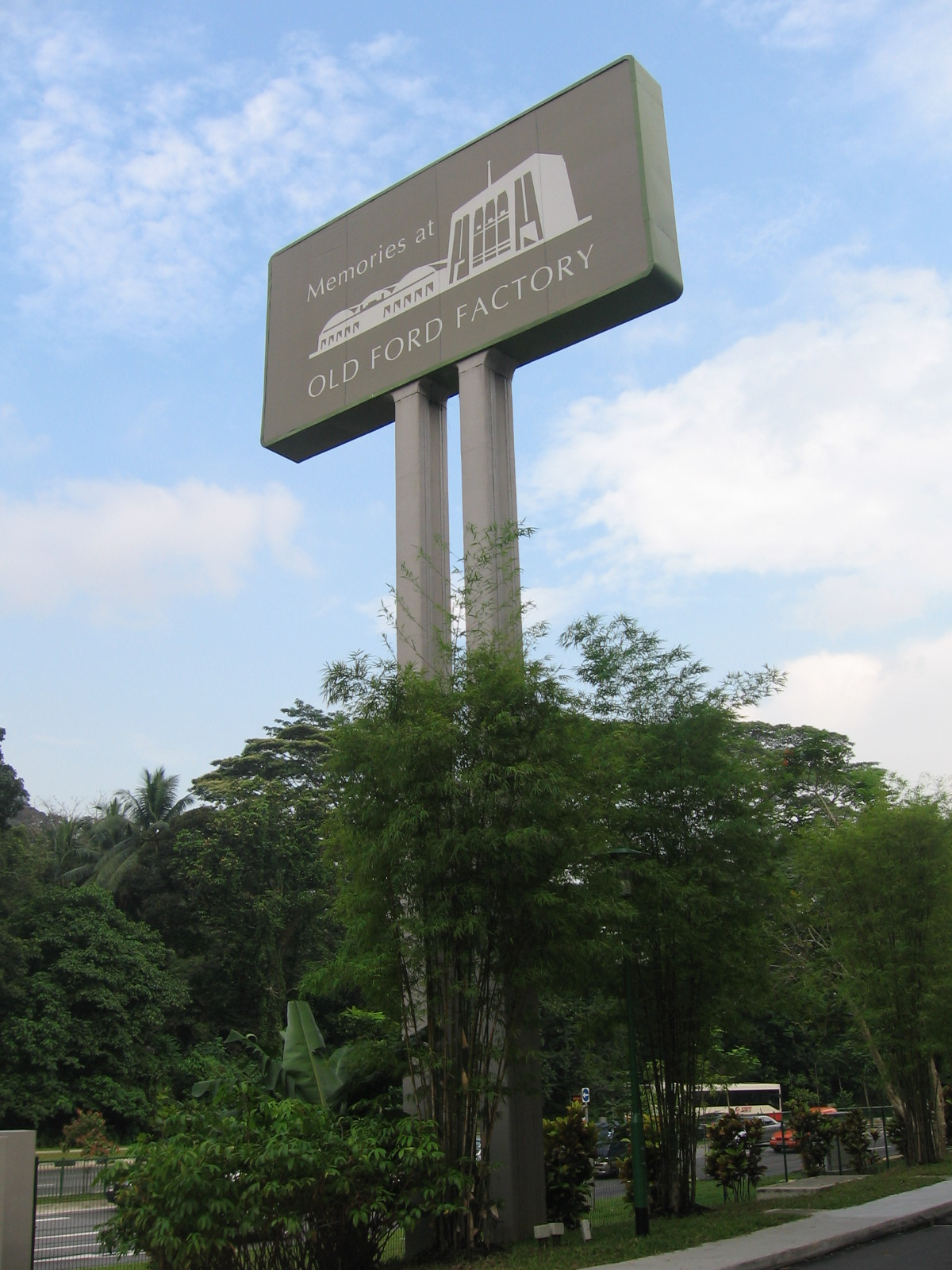

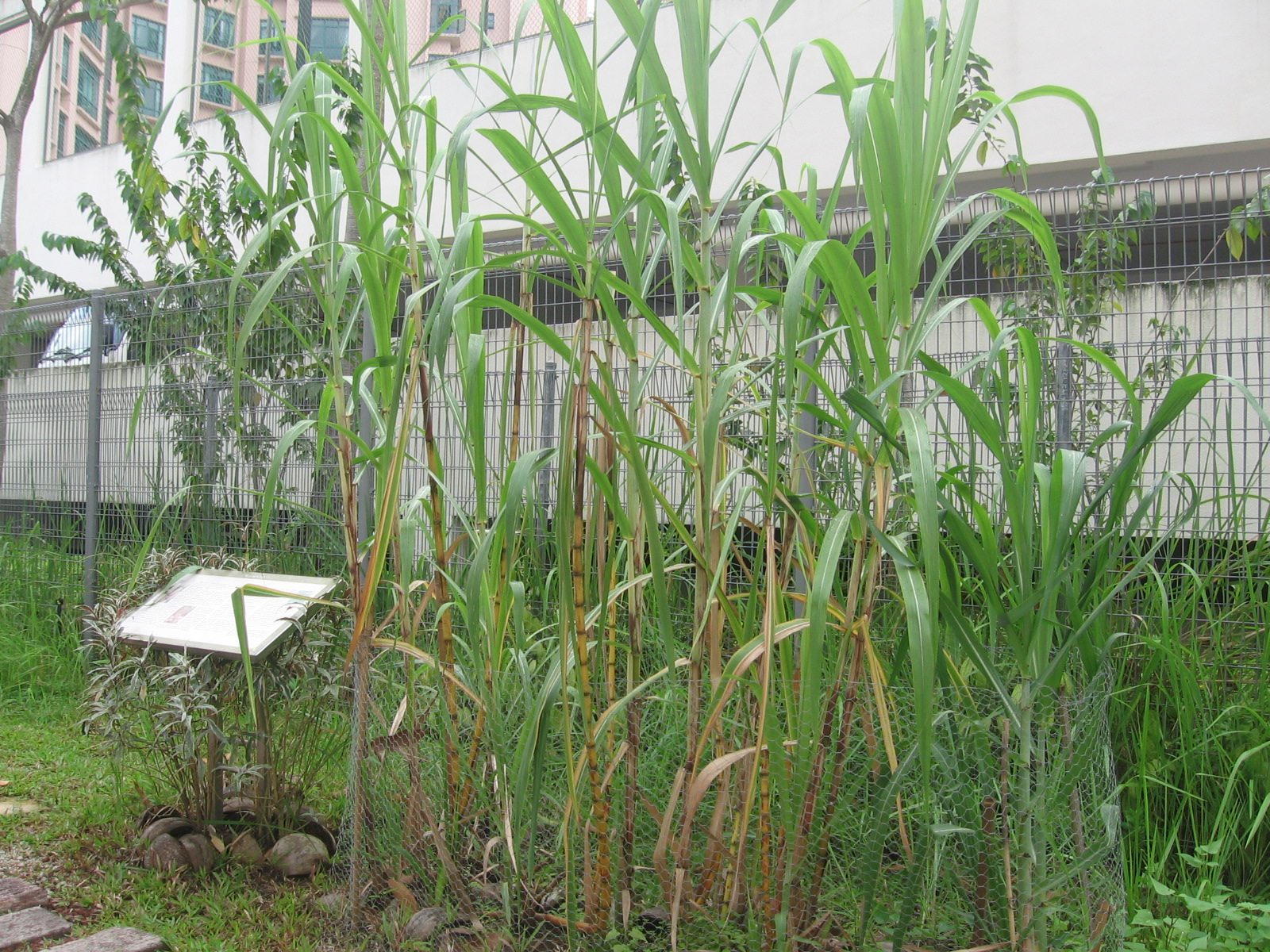

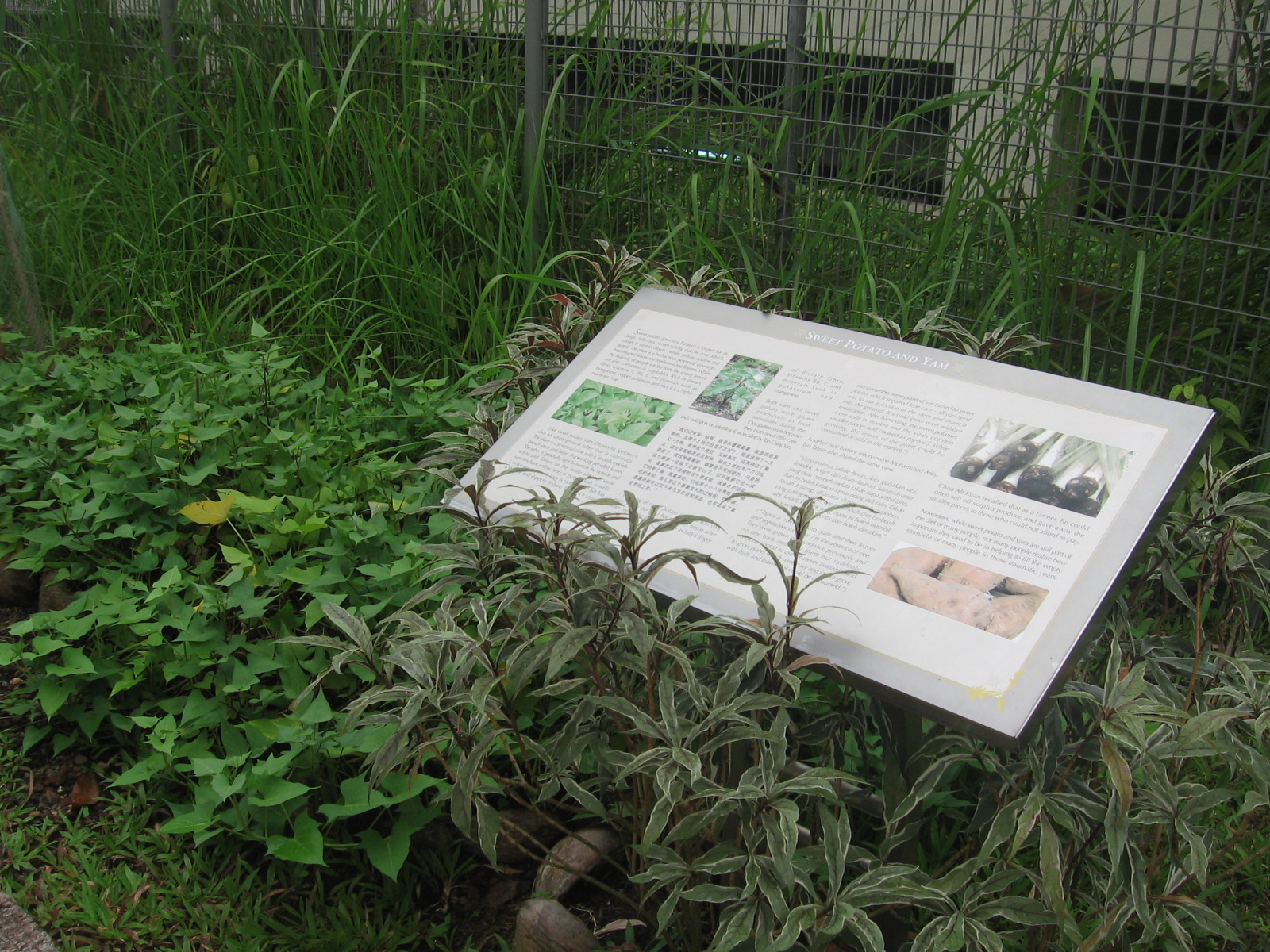

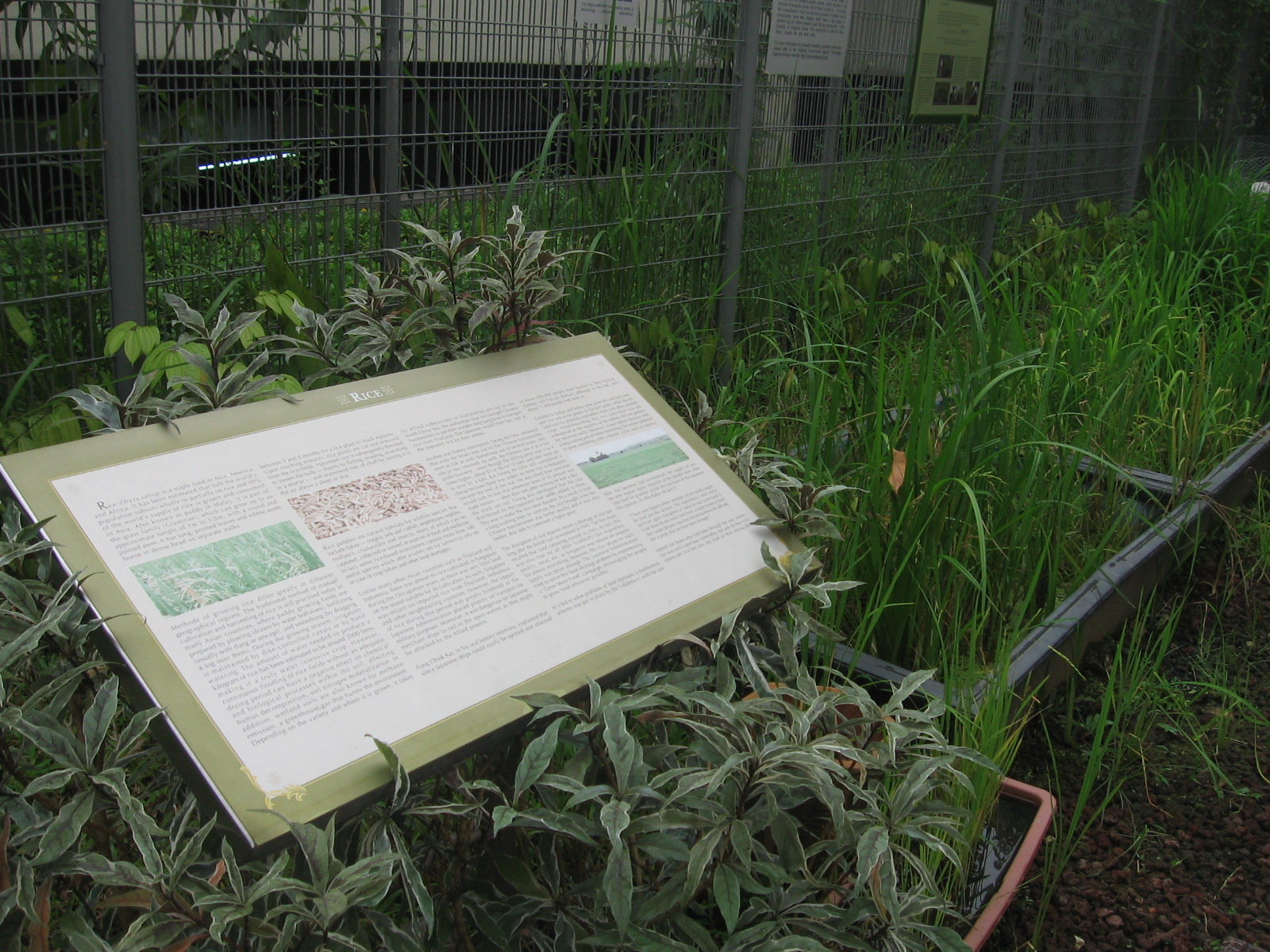

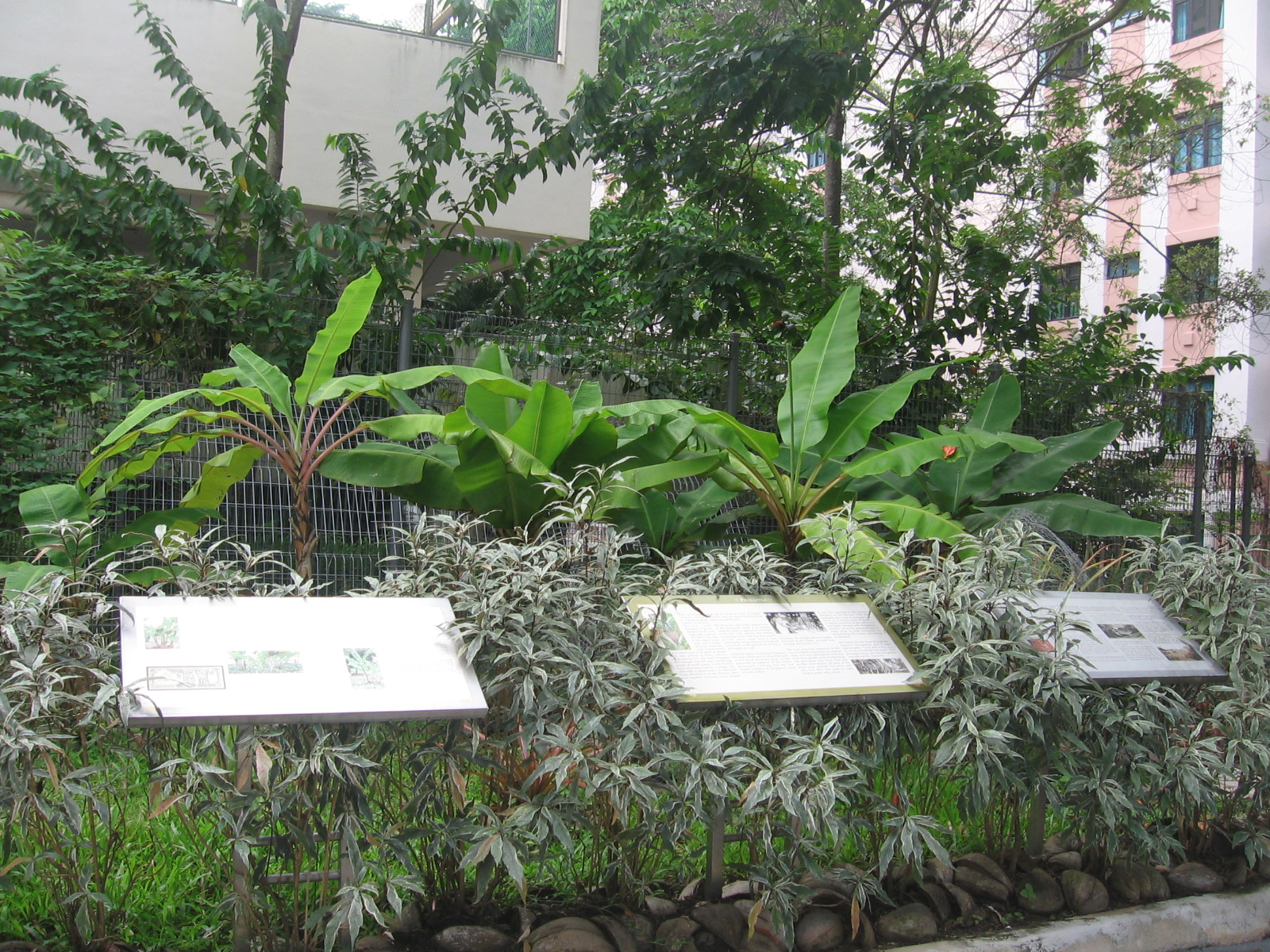

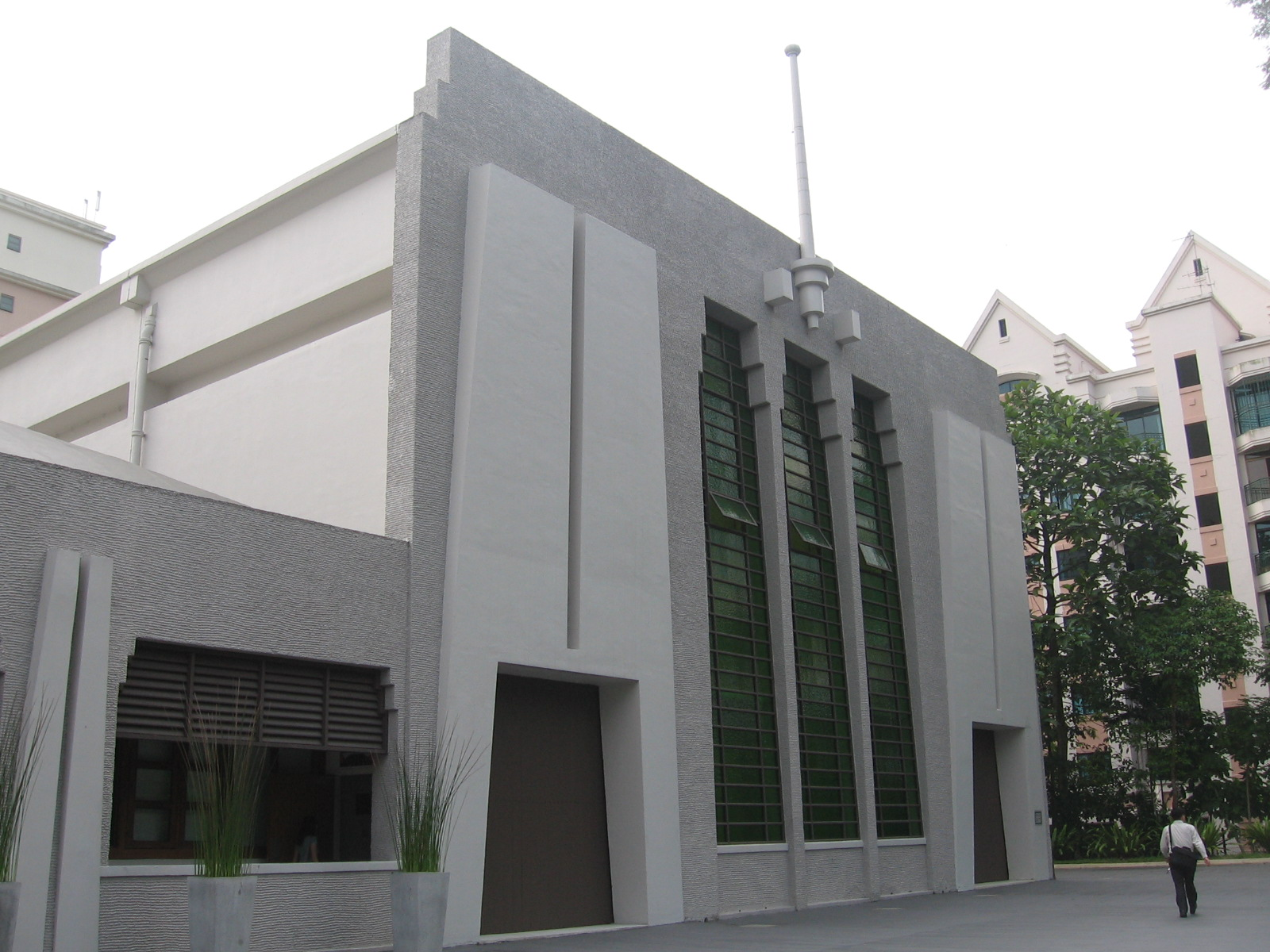

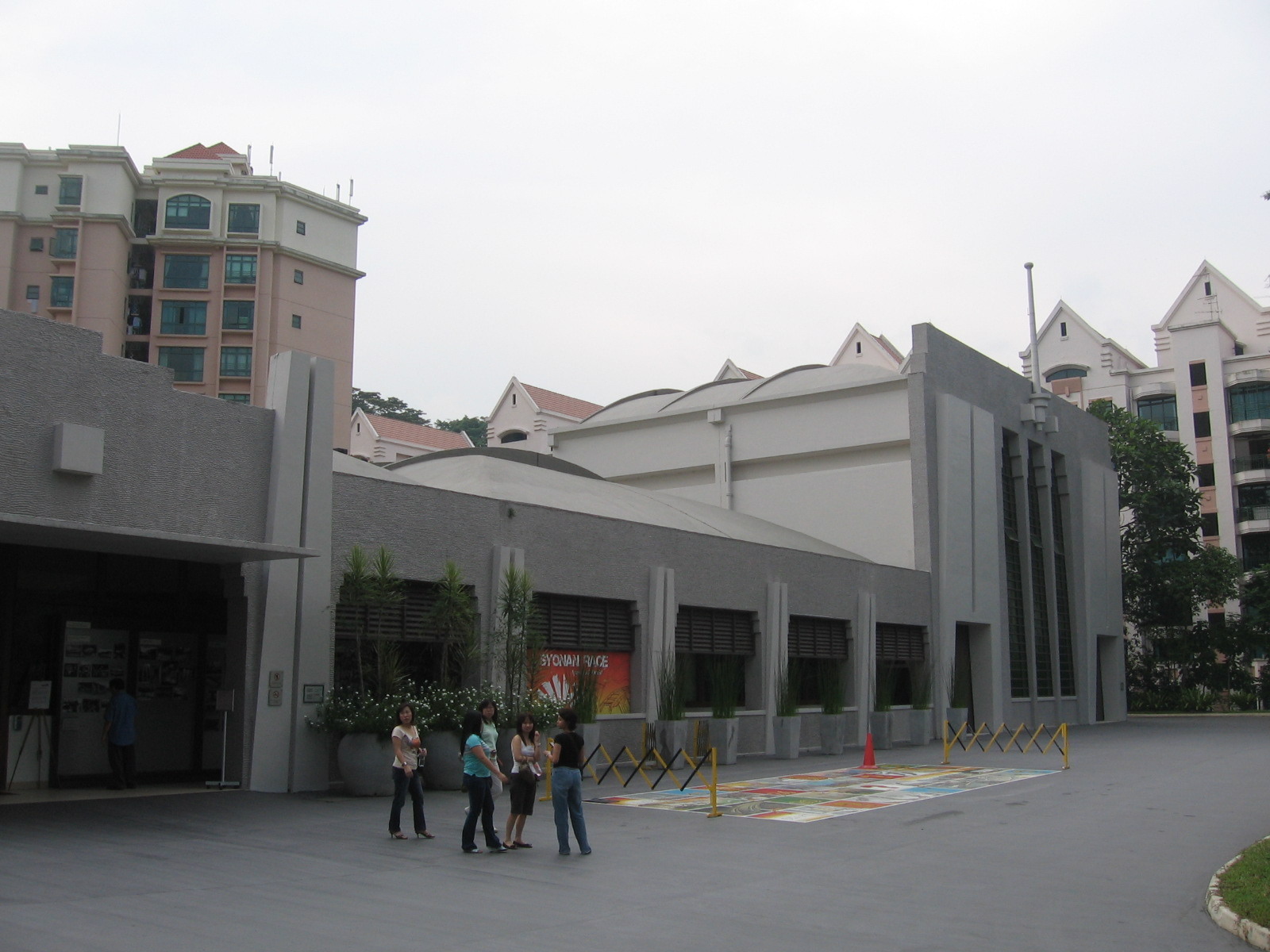

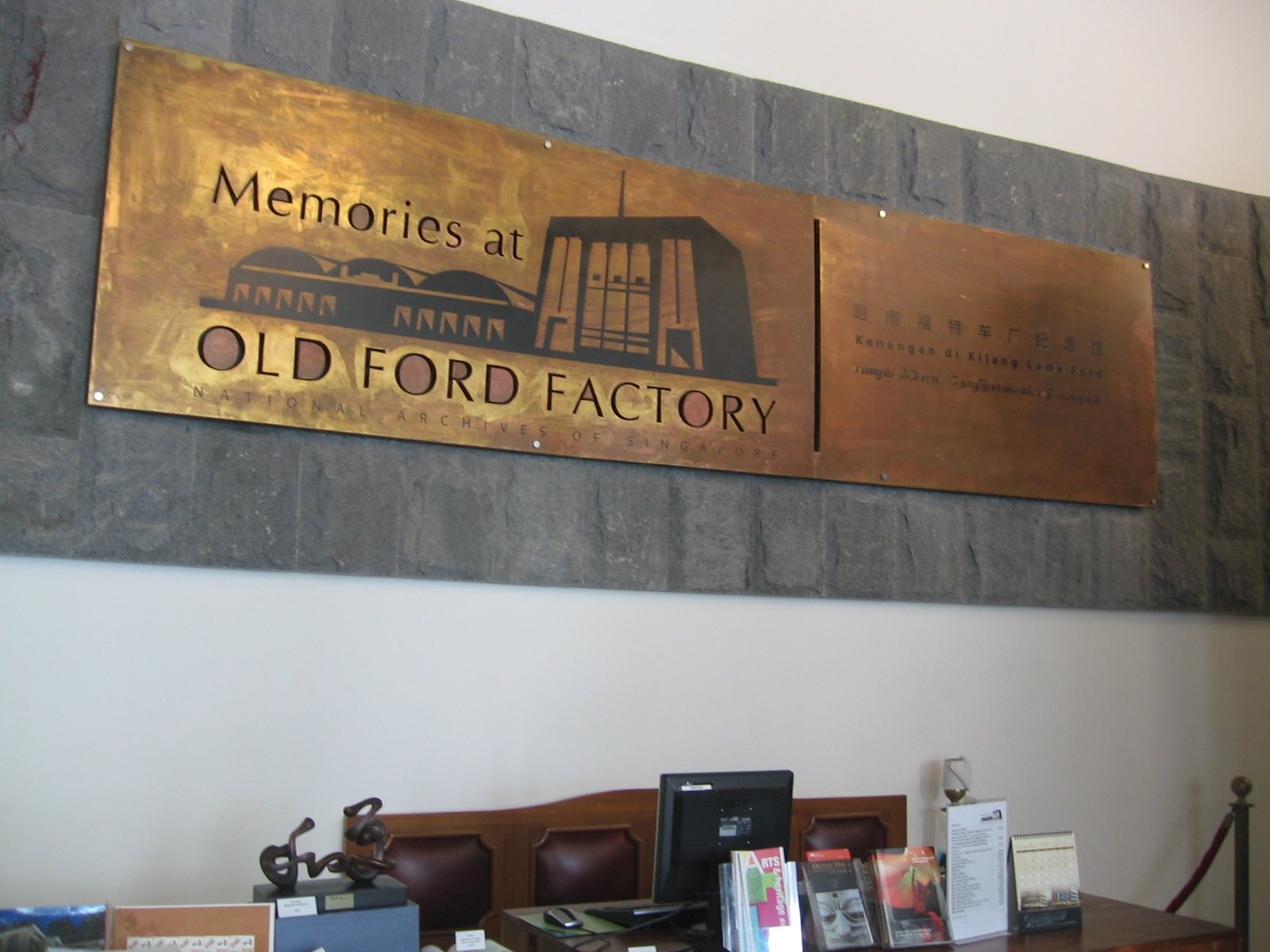

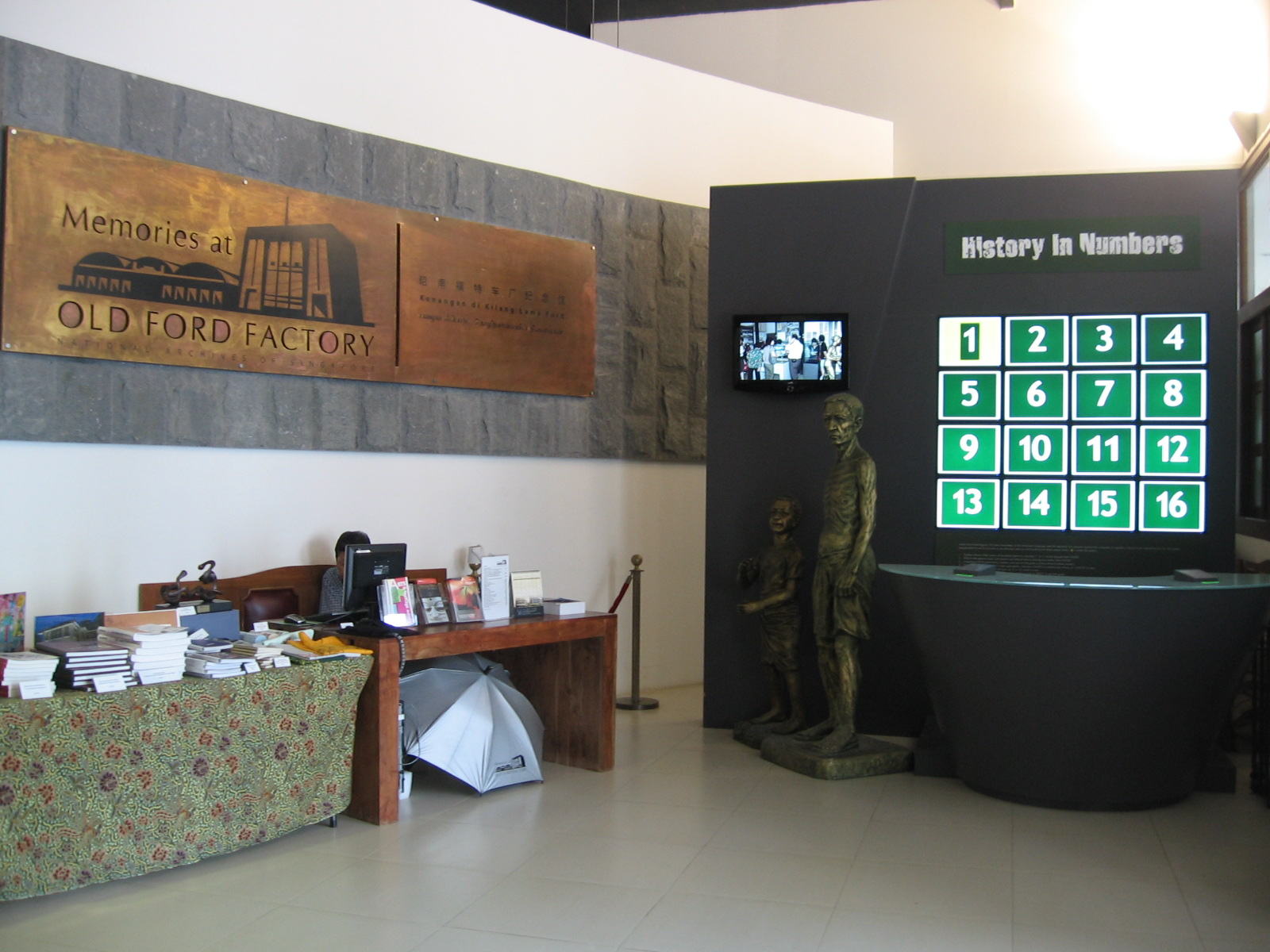

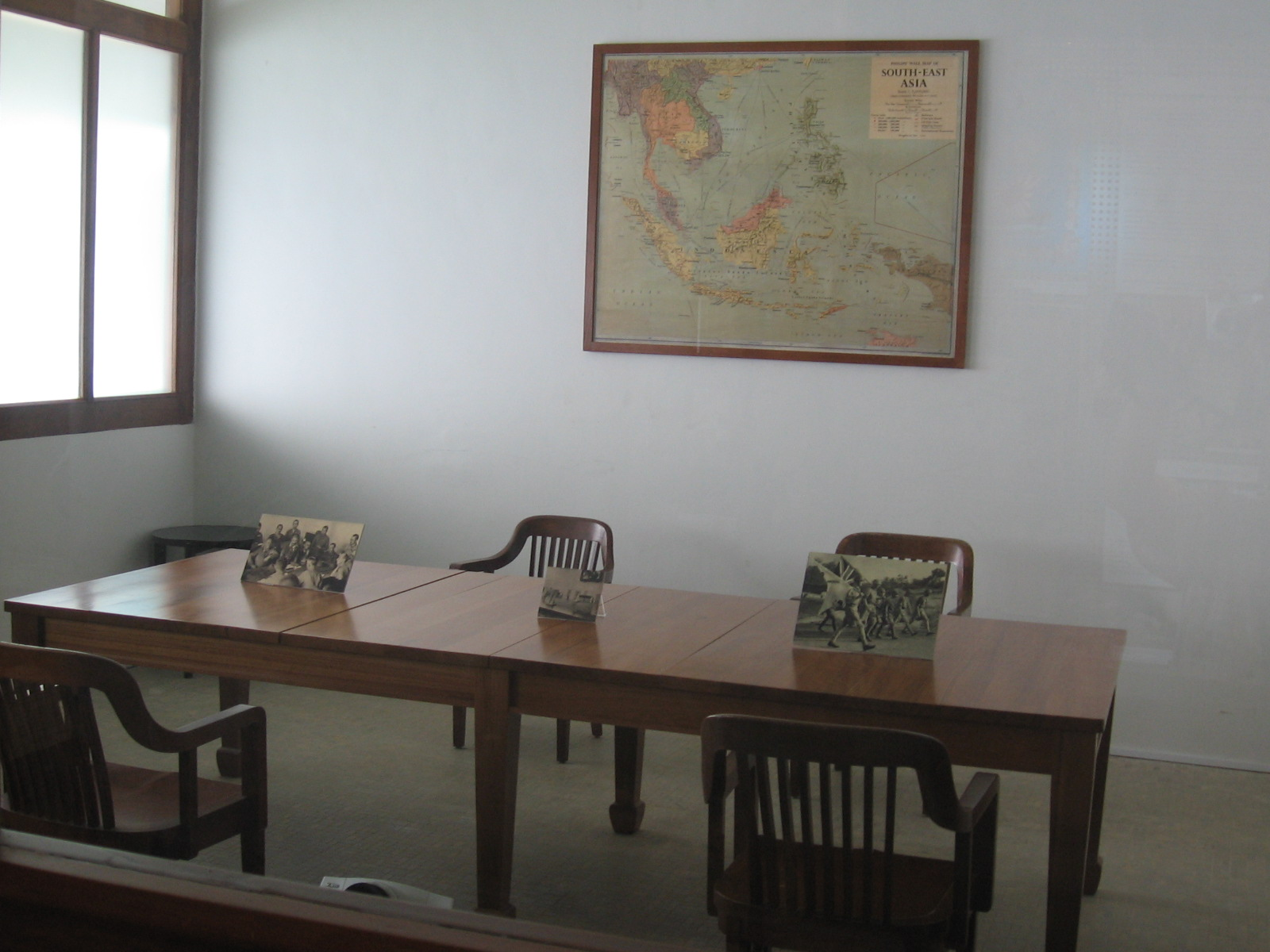

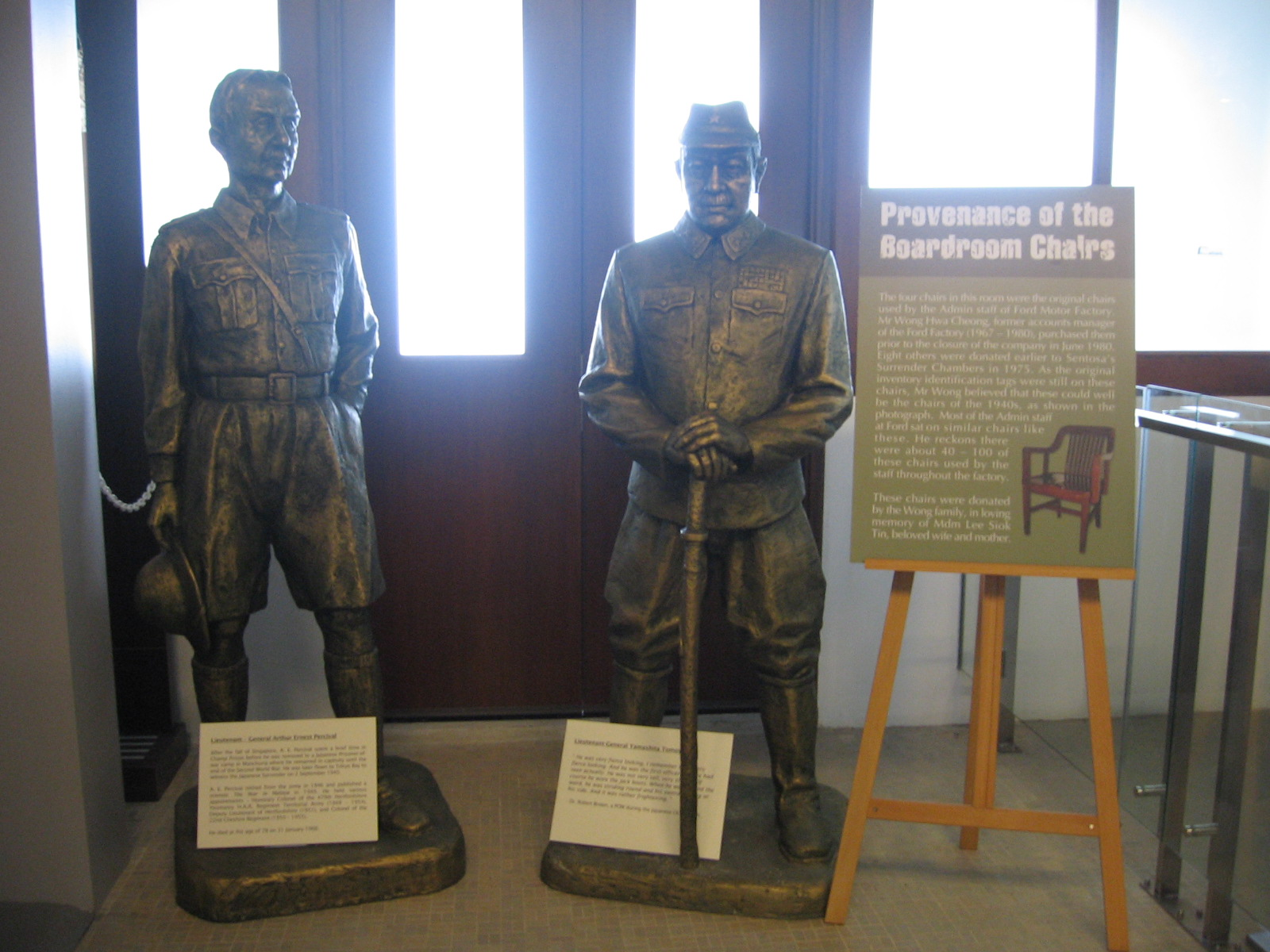

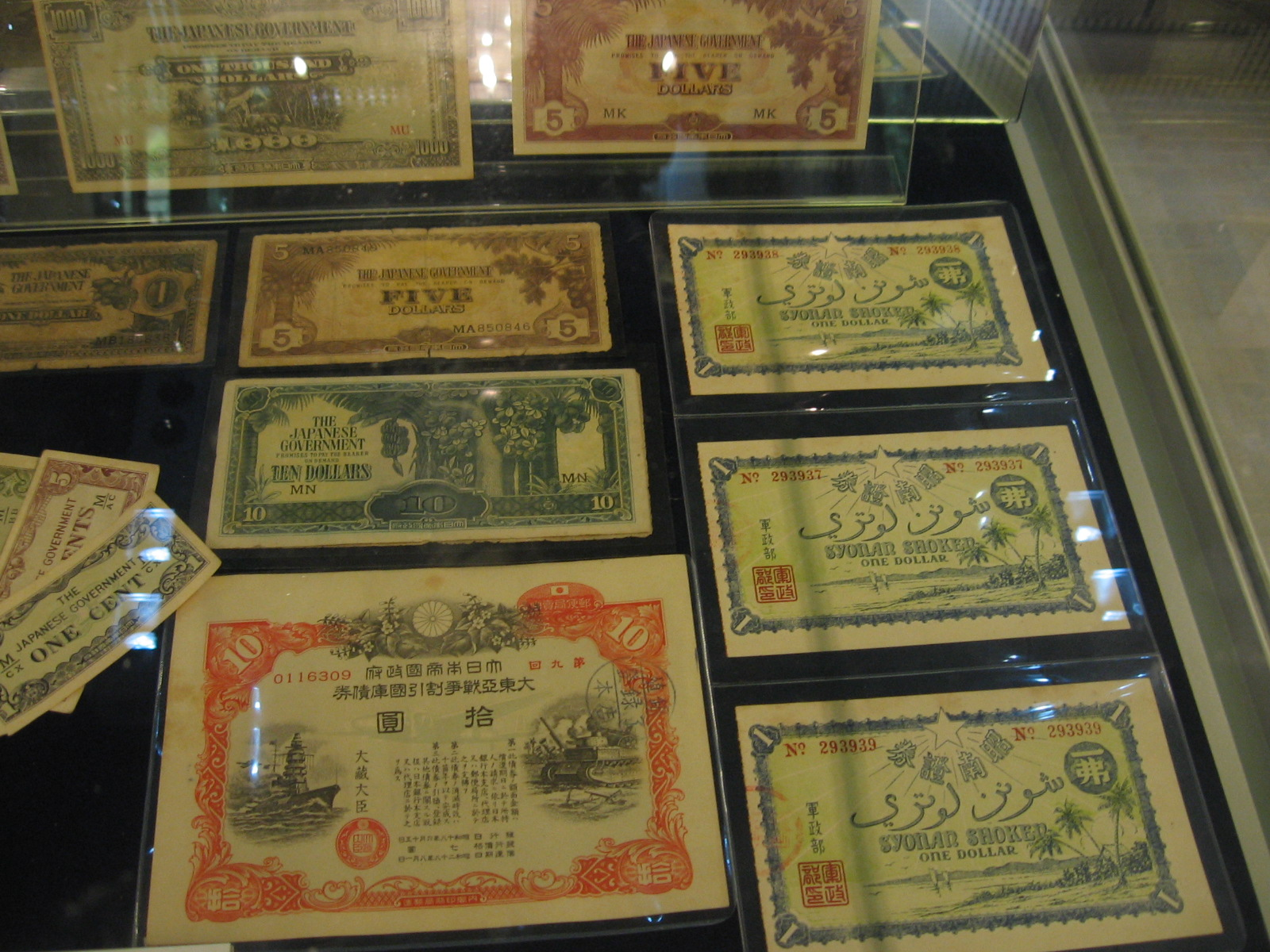

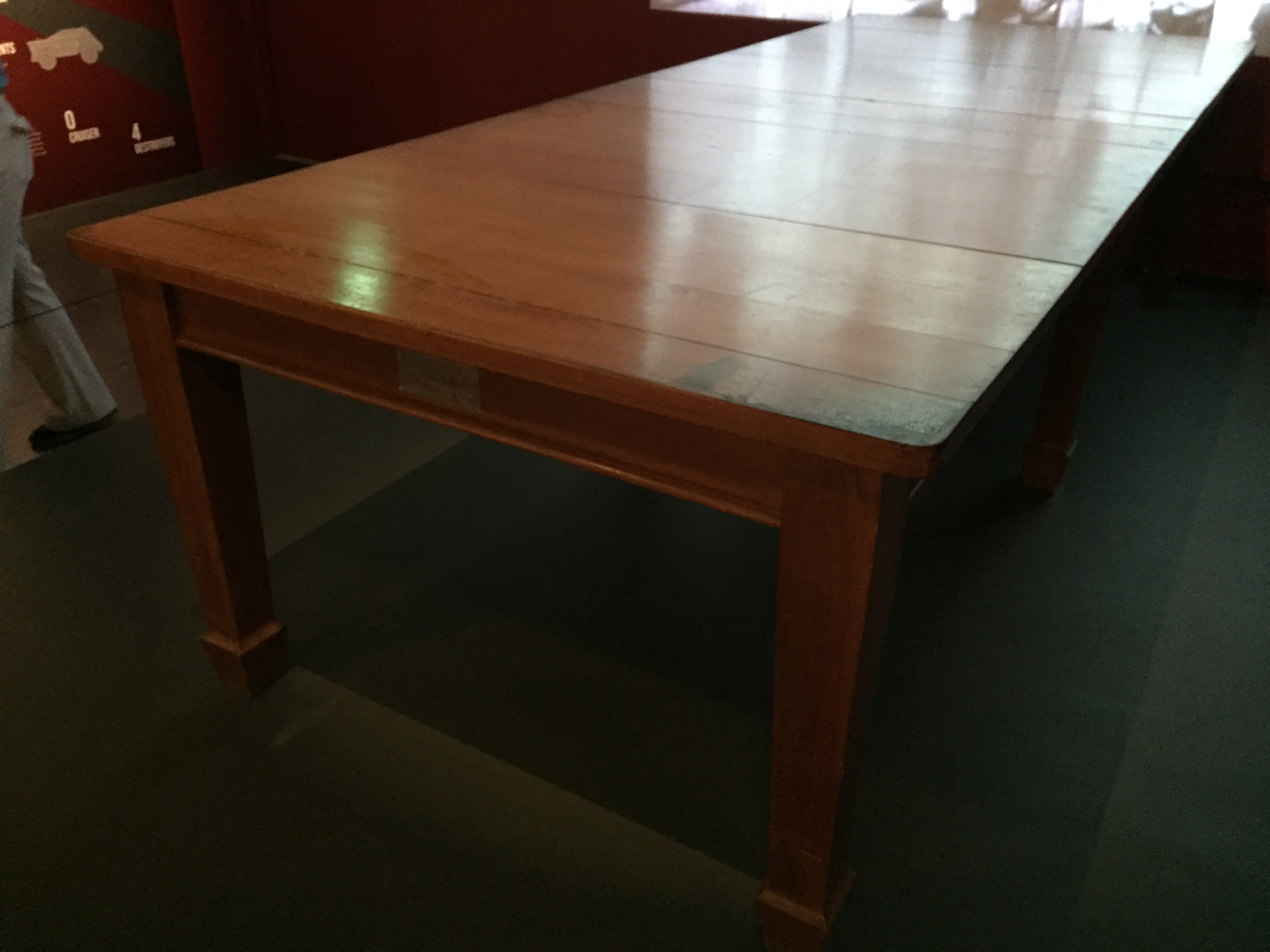
A replica of the surrender table (original currently at the Australian War Memorial)

== See also ==
- Battle of Singapore
