= Bukit Timah Shopping Centre =

Mixed-use development in Singapore

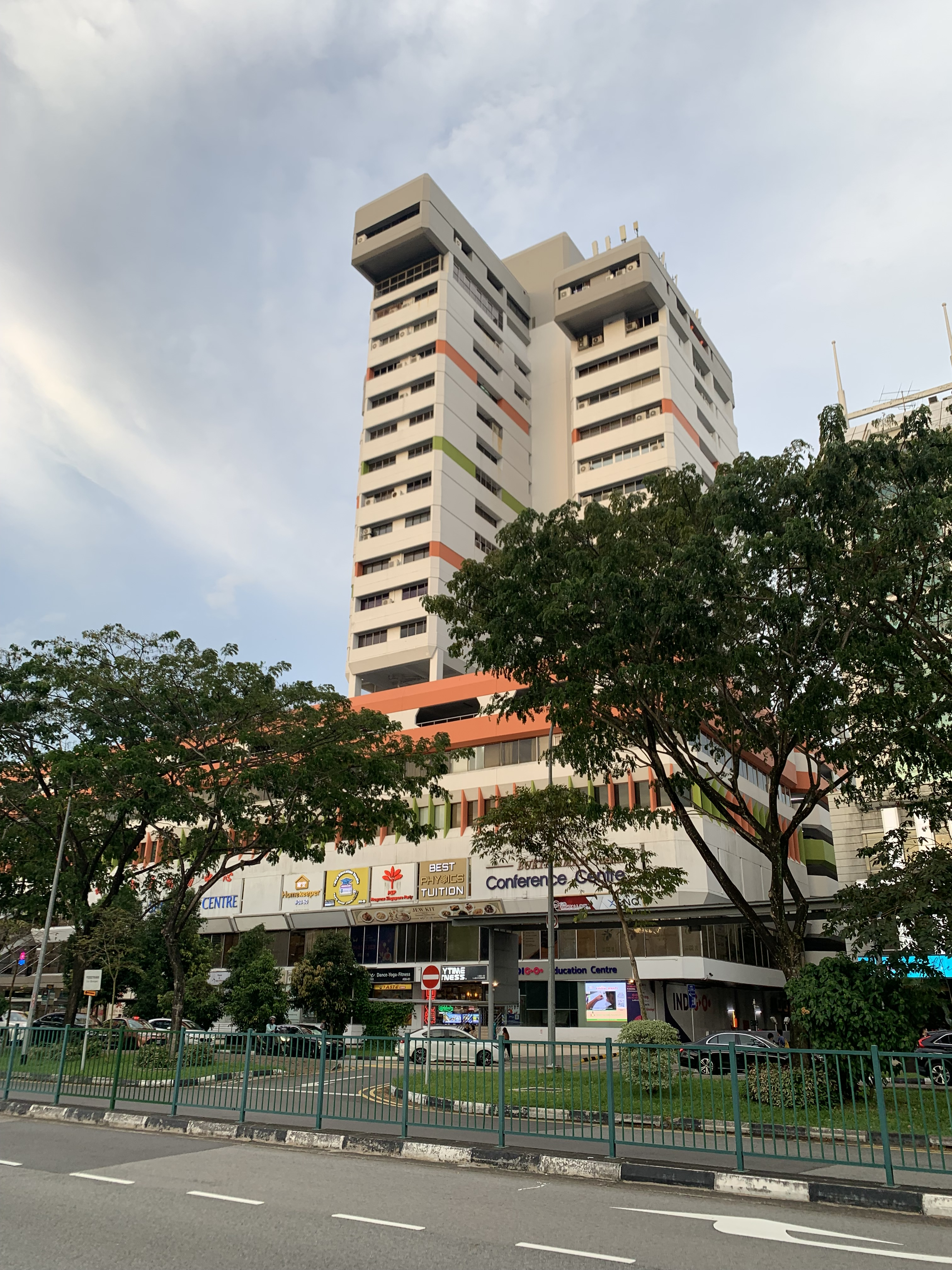
- Location: Singapore
- Coordinates: 1.3411°N 103.7749°E
- Address: 170 Upper Bukit Timah Rd, Singapore 588179
- Opened: 1978

Bukit Timah Shopping Centre is a mixed-use development at the junction of Upper Bukit Timah Road and Jalan Anak Bukit in Bukit Timah, Singapore. Completed in the late 1970s, it comprised an eight-storey retail podium below a 14-storey residential tower block which was to house both regular apartments and studio apartments intended as an "office cum living area." The mall had its heyday in the late 1970s and the 1980s, though it declined in popularity soon after, with maid agencies, centres for learning and renovation companies popping up in vacated units. Its apartments have since been converted into offices.

== History ==
=== Planning and construction ===
Loong & Wing Holdings, or simply L & W Holdings, announced in April 1975 that they planned to build a housing and shopping complex on the 0.8-hectare (2.0-acre) site at the junction of Upper Bukit Timah Road and Jalan Anak Bukit. At 22 storeys, the complex was to be the "first high-rise building in the area." The project's contractor was Wing Construction (s) Pte. Ltd. The following month, the company announced that the Ministry of National Development had given them the go-ahead to start work on the project. Work on the complex started the same month the project was approved. It was then estimated that it would cost over $30 million and the complex was expected to be ready by 1978. Construction took place in two phases, with work on the retail podium starting before work on the tower. In July 1978, the residential tower was scheduled to be completed by the end of the year. By May 1979, the completion date had been shifted to the end of that year instead.

The complex was one of three upcoming major housing and shopping complexes in the area announced in that period, alongside Bukit Timah Plaza and Beauty Park, the latter of which was a $40 million project by the developers of People's Park Complex. The area, which had around 700,000 residents, was then served by the Beauty World Market and Beauty World Town, though both of these were to be torn down soon. Despite the competition with each other, all three malls were expected to "enjoy the unchallengeable advantage of offering suburban shopping unhampered by travelling restrictions." They were also described in the New Nation as "pioneers of intensive property development outside the main commercial districts", which predicted that they would be "closely watched" as they had the potential to "herald a new era of genuine decentralisation in more ways than one" for the country. However, shortly after this, the Beauty Park project was cancelled as it stood in the way of the still-under-construction Pan Island Expressway. L & W Holdings claimed in that year that they did not believe that there would be direct competition between the complex and Bukit Timah Plaza as there was a large enough demand for two shopping complexes in the area.

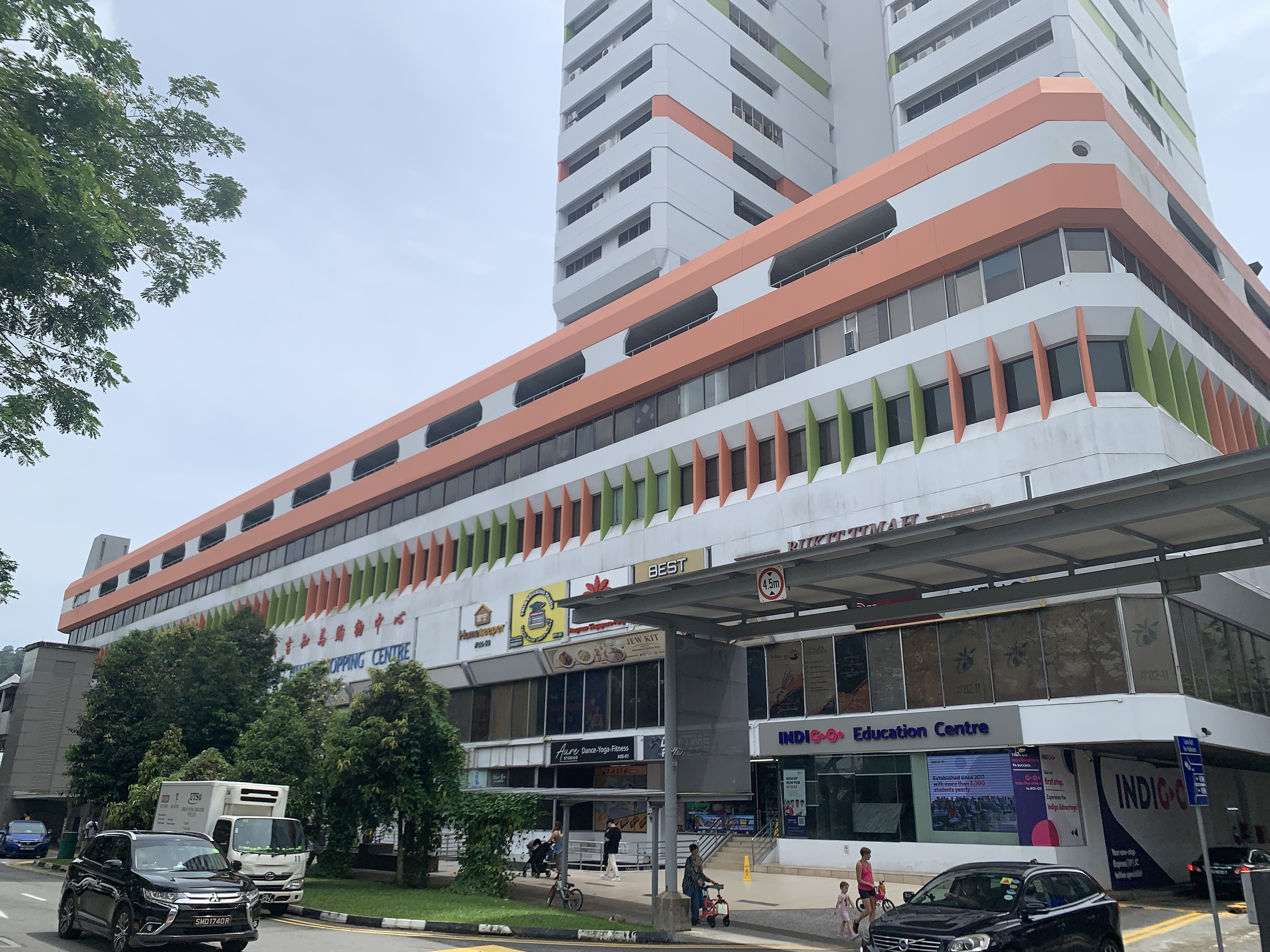
The retail podium in 2025.

Designed by Chee Soon Wah Chartered Architects, who had previously worked on the Textile Centre, the complex was to comprise a tower resting atop an retail podium and a multi-storey carpark. Due to the shape of the lot, the complex was planned in a "spearhead" form, though it was of an otherwise typical design for such a complex in the country in that period. The design "incorporated the concept of 'staggering the void' to create an impression of an abundance of space." The eight-storey retail podium, which was to have two basement floors, was to have 400 retail units on its upper seven floors, while the bottom three floors would be occupied entirely by an emporium save for two banks on the first storey. The fourth storey was to have an 850-seat cinema. The podium was to be fully air-conditioned, serviced 12 escalators, three lifts and several staircases, and it was also to be connected to the other side of Upper Bukit Timah Road to what was then Beauty World Town via a covered pedestrian overhead bridge. It was to feature projecting windows running along its façade. Due to the complex's shape, the podium had several less attractive "tucked-away" units.

The 14-storey tower was initially to house 50 units, which were to be occupied by offices and luxury apartments. In July 1978, it was announced that the residential tower would instead have 44 units, each roughly 140 square metres (1,500 sq ft), which could be used as apartments, offices or both.

=== Opening and heyday ===
The retail podium was ready for occupation by April 1978, and was officially opened with 320 retail units around October and November, though by May of the following year, there were still some "finishing touches" left for the podium. The three-storey emporium, an outlet of Emporium Holdings, was the largest tenant of the complex. It was the 22nd outlet for the emporium, which was then the largest chain of department stores in the country. The OCBC Bank's 18th full-service branch opened on the ground floor on 29 April, with the other bank on that floor being a branch of the Overseas Union Bank. The 868-seat Gala Theatre cinema, a joint venture between L & W Holdings and the cinema operator Cathay Organisation, occupied the third to fifth floors, while a 50-stall hawker centre was located in the basement. There was also a Cold Storage in the podium. The fourth floor had a restaurant and a cafeteria. Also completed was the carpark, which had a capacity for 400 vehicles. By May 1979, most of the podium's units had been rented out, with the remaining units being those that were out of the way. At the residential tower's completion in 1981, it had two 3,500-square-foot (330 m^{2}) penthouses and eight 2,500-square-foot (230 m^{2}) regular apartments occupying two floors. The rest of the tower housed 34 2,000-square-foot (190 m^{2}) studio apartments, which were intended as "office cum living area."

Like Bukit Timah Plaza and the next-door Beauty World Centre, built in the early 1980s, the complex was popular from its opening to the early 1980s. In this period, the air-conditioning was a draw in itself, then offering patrons a "new and exciting experience of shopping in a cool, air-conditioned multi-storey complex, which boasted floor after floor of shops selling affordable clothes and household items." The complex's "ahead of its time" façade was then painted pink, blue and yellow to indicate the different sections of the mall. This reportedly "[made] it readily identifiable from a distance and [helped] it stand out from nearby malls like Beauty World Centre and Bukit Timah Plaza." Much like those two malls, the complex's clientele then included tourists from Malaysia, who were attracted by the "good deals" offered. The shopping centre became "well-known" amongst this group for affordable clothing stores.

In May 1982, the German public radio and broadcaster Norddeutscher Rundfunk moved its Asian bureau into the complex as the rent at its former premises in Hong Kong had grown "exorbitant". Other factors included ASEAN being "an important newsmaker", Singapore "more or less at the geographical centre of the area" and the country's "excellent and very effective communication facilities." The United Workers of Petroleum Industry trade union moved its offices into the building in June 1993.

=== Decline and maid agencies ===
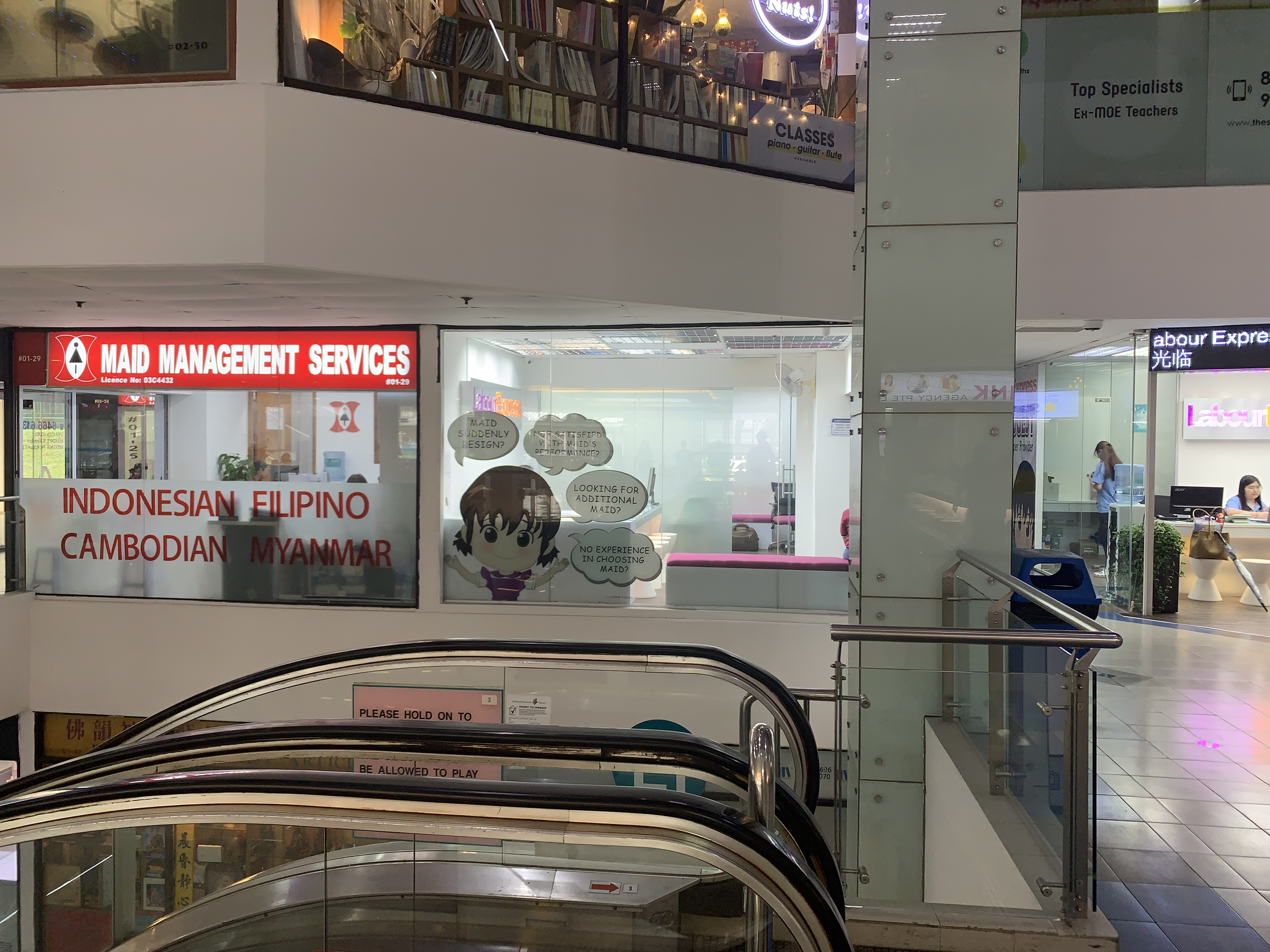
Maid agencies at the mall in 2025.

In February 1998, Elizabeth Gwee of The Straits Times named the "once-popular" complex as an example of the "shopping centres that time has forgotten", noting that it was mainly surviving off of regulars and those looking to bargain. Business had declined by at least 20% in the past five years and "look set to go down even more." Like many other malls in the country built in the late 1970s and the early 1980s, it had by then become a hub for renovation companies and maid agencies, which had begun popping up at the complex due to the "fairly affordable" rent. Bukit Timah Shopping Centre in particular had become known for maid agencies with "dubious advertising", such as the Everest employment agency, which declared in a poster to "have Indonesian Christian eat and handle pork on video and personally screen." Beyond the renovation companies and maid agencies, which took up most of the complex, there were also a "sprinkling" of clothes stores "left over" from the mall's heyday. However, she noted that the mall had recently undergone a $4 million renovation targeting the air-conditioning, piping and flooring.

Gwee called the complex "Renovation Contractor and Maid Agency Central" in July 2000, though she felt that it was "still possible to uncover elements of style" at the shopping centre through the "handful" of clothing stores with "unappealing displays and cluttered interiors" which sold "cheap" and "trendy" clothes. By April 2002, the retail podium was reportedly "dead" outside of the lunch rush and a third of the complex's 420 retail units were vacant. Businesses such as maid agencies, dentists, clinics and beauty salons had flourished at the complex, as well as in surrounding shopping centres such as the neighbouring Beauty World Plaza and Beauty World Centre. This was partially attributed to the complex's age, as well as the rerouting of nearby bus routes. The URA announced that it planned to rejuvenate the area. The authority claimed that it sought to make the district, known as Anak Bukit, "the next mini-Orchard Road or Holland Village." However, it was announced in March 2004 that the URA had scrapped the plan. The mall was repainted in 2005.

The mall was again upgraded in 2006, with renovation works beginning in August. However, these works caused a water pipe to burst in October, flooding the basement floors and damaging products and negatively impacting business at the two dozen shops occupying the space. Around the same period, Hazel Yong of The Straits Times reported that Malay bridal stores had begun popping up at the mall, drawn by the low rent. In the past eight years, nine such stores had appeared in the complex, bringing the total number of Malay bridal stores in the shopping centre to 11. Despite the surrounding area lacking a predominantly Malay population, they were able to draw clientele from other districts such as Jurong and Bukit Panjang. This gave the "run-down, and somewhat isolated" complex a "new lease of life". She wrote that both the complex and the Golden Landmark Shopping Complex were "developing a reputation as places offering quality services at good prices." In April 2008, Lisabel Ting reported that sex shops had also begun to open up at the complex. In August 2011, Melissa Kok of The Business Times reported that there had a "Korea Town" had sprung up in the area, including at the complex, as a result of several South Koreans moving into the area, as well as the Singapore Korean International School moving into the neighbourhood.

Michael Malay of Al Jazeera reported in June 2014 that the mall's maid agencies displayed maids "at work", performing various household chores. The maids on display were positioned behind "garish signs and posters, testifying to their friendliness and industriousness, or advertising 'super promo' rates and 'special discounts'." He claimed to have found similar displays in other similar malls such as Katong Shopping Centre, finding that they were the "culmination" of "networks and organisations extending from Singapore to various parts of Southeast Asia" and what was "effectively a multimillion dollar industry." In response, the Philippine Overseas Labor Office took action against the two maid agencies accused of this practice, Homekeeper Agency and Budget Maid Agency. On the other hand, a spokesperson from the Ministry of Manpower claimed that the ministry had visited the mall after the report and found no "inappropriate displays" of foreign domestic workers at the two maid agencies. However, shortly after this, the ministry banned "unnacceptable practices" such as "insensitive advertising and inappropriate display of maids by agencies", such as "likening maids to goods" in their advertisements, displaying maids' fees and biodata and having maids sit in rows outside the agency. The Straits Times reported that in the months following this decision, inspectors from the ministry had come to the mall to "ensure" that the agencies adhered to the new guideline.

In December 2015, the Beauty World MRT station opened in front of Beauty World Centre and Beauty World Plaza, which were next to the complex. It was initially expected that the station would "breathe new life" into the mall. After the station's location was announced, sales activity at the three shopping centres became "rife". However, the station's opening did not ultimately have a lasting, significant effect on the mall. It was reported in November 2016 that eight of the now-deceased Loong & Wing Holdings Loong Yoke Phin's daughters had sued another daughter and his only son and four of his grandchildren from that son over the family's four companies, including Long Win Investment, which owned 32 of the complex's retail units, then valued at around $68 million. The Progress Singapore Party political party opened its headquarters on the complex's 14th floor in January 2020. In September, carpark operator LHN acquired the centre's carpark for $16.2 million through a 40% stake in a joint-venture company. PropertyGuru wrote in 2021 that the mall was largely occupied by employment and maid agencies, learning centres, as well asdesign, counstruction and engineering companies. There were also salons, boutiques, a few clothing stores and printing stores. Both the cinema and the penthouses had been taken over by a church, while the rest of the tower block was now used as offices. Ong Sor Fern of The Straits Times reported in February 2022 that the mall was "cluttered with tuition centres and maid agencies."
