= Sim Lim Tower =

Mixed-use building in Singapore

Coordinates: 1.3034°N 103.8512°E

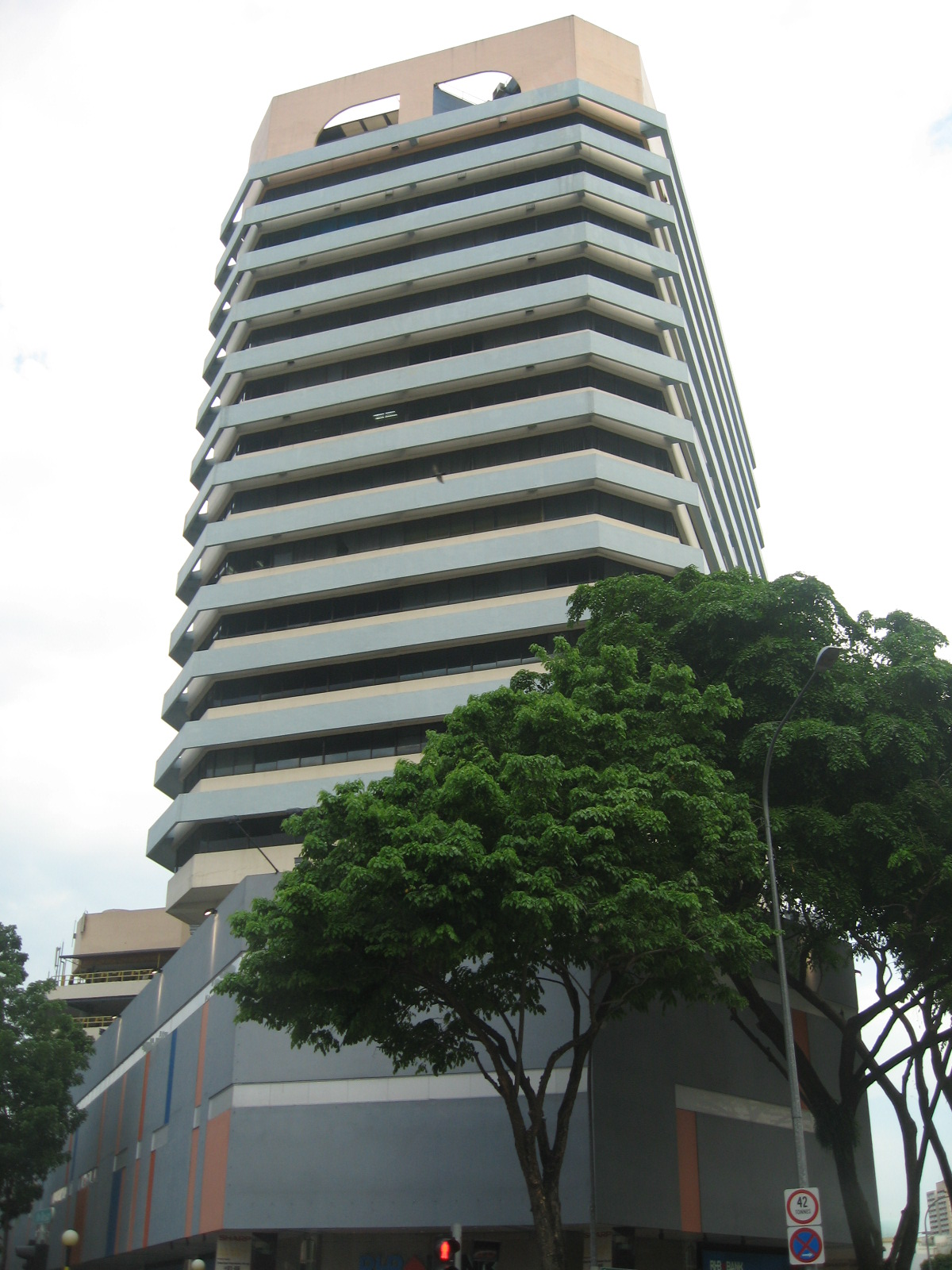
Sim Lim Tower in 2006.

Sim Lim Tower is an office and shopping complex at the junction of Jalan Besar and Sungei Road in Rochor, Singapore. Comprising a office tower resting on a four-storey retail podium, the 17-storey complex was intended as a "one-stop shop centre" for electronic equipment. Construction began in the mid-1970s after around a decade of delays took place in two phases, with the retail podium opening in 1979 and the office tower opening in the early 1980s. The complex was a success, though its salesman also gained a reputation for being aggressive in the 1980s.

== History ==
=== Planning and construction ===
Sim Lim Investments Limited announced in July 1965 that they planned to erect an 18-storey skyscraper at the junction of Jalan Besar and Sungei Road. The project, named Sim Lim Tower, was initially to be a "multi-business complex" targeting tourists. The ground floor would house the offices of airline, travel and banking companies while, the first floor was to be an "ultra-modern shopping arcade" serviced by two elevators, accompanied by a roof garden and open-air restaurant on the second floor. Offices would occupy the third floor while the rest of the building was to house a 200-room luxury hotel, topped by a revolving restaurant tower. The project, which was then projected to cost $3 million, was announced "in response to government call to boost tourism in the State." The architects then were Malayan Architects Co-partnership. The company then claimed that plans for the skyscraper were being finalised, that construction was to begin by the end of the year, pending approval from the authorities, and that the building was to be ready by 1967.

The project only reached the "final stage of planning" in 1971. This was partially caused by "protracted negotiations" with squatters on the site, though the company claimed that both parties had come to an agreement and that the squatters had moved out. Another cause was the proposal that the building receive a "twin" building, also a complex featuring a tower resting on a shopping podium, which was to be linked to Sim Lim Tower via underground passageways. Construction was then projected to cost $6.5 million and was to begin once it received approval from the authorities. Upon completion, it was to "[tower] over a cluster of dilapidated pre-war houses." In October 1972, the New Nation reported that construction was now scheduled to begin by the end of the year, and that Sim Lim Investments, which had not been performing well financially, were "looking for finance" for the project.

In November 1974, Sim Lim Investments announced that they would be "finally going ahead" with the project, which was now to cost $16 million. The company claimed that the squatter issue had been completely resolved two years ago. Due to the waning of the "boom in the hotel industry", the tower was to be occupied by offices instead of a revolving restaurant. The company had also acquired an adjacent site, which allowed for an additional two floors to the building. Construction was to take place in two phases. The office tower, which was to house 47 retail units and a restaurant in addition to 121 office units, would be built first, followed by the retail podium housing 68 retail units. The complex was to be the tallest structure in the Jalan Besar area upon completion. The podium was also to house a split-deck carpark, and the office tower was to include a penthouse. The architects for the project were now Design Partnership, who had designed the structure "with an eye to making it a significant landmark at that very busy corner of Singapore." Construction was projected to cost $11.6 million in March 1975. However, The Business Times reported in November 1976 that the project had been facing the "continuing problem of moving tenants out of the site."

Sim Lim Realty, a subsidiary of the Sim Lim Investment Group which had been put in charge of the project, announced in October 1977 that a part of the retail podium was to house a "one-stop shopping centre" for electronics, to be called the Singapore Electronic and Electrical Centre. The company claimed that the mall would sell "practically any electronic and electrical product available in Singapore", becoming the first centre of its kind in the country. The podium was now to have 180 units and was to be the first built, and the office tower was to house two banks as well as the offices of the group's companies, in addition to the general offices. The cost of construction was then estimated to be $20 million, and the building was to be completed by the end of 1980. However, shortly after this announcement, Hong Leong Realty of the Hong Leong Group announced that it was looking into establishing a similar electronics centre for a planned mixed-use development, also on Jalan Besar. Sim Lim Realty claimed that by then, all of the retail units at Sim Lim Tower had sold for a total of $20 million. The tenants were to be electronics and electrical dealers "scattered" around the Rochor Canal and Sungei Road areas who had been displaced by urban redevelopment. Sim Lim Realty then planned to provide convention facilities in the retail podium. However, as the tenants had already made plans to establish a club area which would provide these facilities, the developers' plan was scrapped in March 1978. The New Nation then reported that 160 units were occupied by electronic and electrical dealers, and that the mall would also sell spare parts and offer repair and after-sales services.

=== Opening, initial popularity and negative reputation ===
The retail podium was completed and opened in December 1979, though some of the shops were still undergoing renovation works. There were then 153 units, 70% of which were occupied by electronics and electrical retailers. Other businesses at its opening included the two banks and shops selling stationery, traditional Chinese medicine, shoes, antiques, gifts and Chinese herbs. However, the shops selling gifts and medicine closed down in less than a year. Their failure was attributed to their products being "totally out-of-character with the rest in the building." Above the podium was a four-deck carpark with a capacity for 197 vehicles. The retail podium was serviced by escalators and a goods lift in addition to the elevators serving the entire building. Judy Tan of The Straits Times considered it to be an example of a "new breed" of malls which "thrives on specialisation", alongside Textile Centre, Eminent Plaza and the Golden Landmark Shopping Complex. The office tower, which was to have 106 units, was then scheduled to open by the end of the following year. However, the Business Times reported in July that the tower's completion date had been shifted to 1981. The offices from the 13th to the 19th floors were occupied by the offices of the companies of the Sim Lim group. The entire complex ended up being 17-storeys-tall.

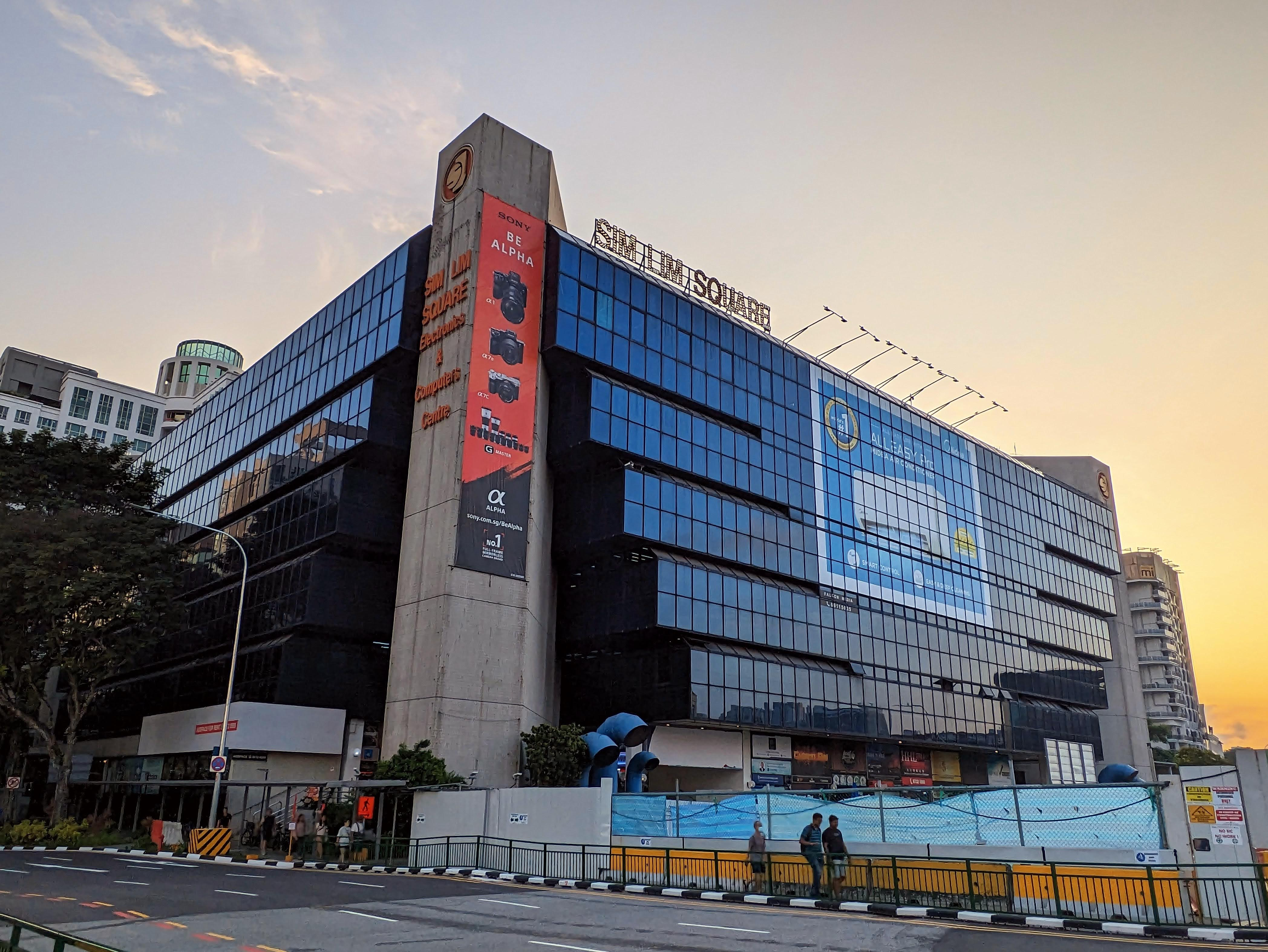
The nearby Sim Lim Square, which was developed as an electronics centre in response to Sim Lim Tower's success.

In March 1983, the Business Times named the complex as an example of a "popular" shopping centre, "where sales are brisk, where shopowners do not have to count their money, where cash registers never stop ringing." The Straits Times reported in September that the mall was popular with Indian tourists visiting Singapore. Valerie D'Costa and Fok Jun Ee wrote in May 1984 that the mall had "never been without [its] bargain hunters", largely due to most of its tenants being from the "cut-price haven" of the Thieves' Market on Sungei Road. However, it was reported in July that the complex then had only the second highest number of computer shops for a mall in the country, with only half as many such shops as People's Park Centre, which had come to be known as the "Computers Bazaar". The success of Sim Lim Tower led Sim Lim Investments to convert a separate upcoming development located diagonally opposite from the complex, named Sim Lim Square, from an office and shopping complex into an "electrical and electronics city" without office space. This decision was "met with considerable success", with 70% of Sim Lim Tower's electronic centre's tenants buying units in Sim Lim Square for expansion by January 1986. Half of all units in Sim Lim Square sold had then been bought by Sim Lim Tower tenants. Despite the 1985 Singapore recession, most of the shops at the complex were seeing "brisk sales".

In the first half of 1986, two salesmen at the complex were arrested and convicted for assaulting customers in separate incidents. Shopkeepers reported that a 20% to 40% drop in sales followed this. The salesmen involved were dismissed and one of the two shops involved moved out shortly after. As a result of the incidents, the Singapore Tourist Promotion Board announced in June that the complex would be blacklisted from its brochures and pamphlets, as well as its official guidebook which had previously recommended the complex as a "fiercely competitive high-tech bazaar!" The centre's tenants strongly opposed the decision, believing that the drop in sales was "punishment enough" and that it was "unfair as it lumped innocent retailers together with the culprits." Tourists then accounted for 80% of sales at the mall. On the other hand, the Sim Lim group claimed to be "unperturbed by the bad publicity", feeling that it "could be overcome." They announced that they planned to "promote Sim Lim Square by capitalising on Sim Lim Tower's reputation and high occupancy rate." On 24 June, more than 120 of the mall's shopkeepers met to discuss the issue. A committee was formed to "put together a case" to present to the board and to improve the complex's now-"poor" reputation. The shopkeepers also decided on a team which was to appeal directly to the board. In July, the board announced that they would consider relisting the complex in its guidebook. When Sim Lim Square opened in 1987, the tenants there formed a trade association to ensure that Sim Lim Tower's reputation for "rude and aggressive traders" did not "rub off on them." By then, the Sim Lim Tower association had dealt with eight separate incidents.

In November 1989, Sim Lim Investments group was acquired by the Indonesian group Summa, after which it "quickly moved to consolidate its ownership" of the complex. Sim Lim Investments agreed to purchase the complex's 14th floor from Keppel Finance, which had been formed through the merger of Shing Loong Finance and Sim Lim Finance, for around $205 million in February 1990. After this, the company owned roughly 11% of the building. In December 1993, the group, since renamed Summa Investments, announced that it sought to sell off all of its properties, including the complex's 15th to 17th floors and its carpark.

Khalid Khamis of Berita Harian reported in November 2000 that the complex had become a "paradise" for African electronics traders, particularly those from Nigeria, Somalia, Mali, Cameroon and South Africa, who were looking to purchase spare electronic parts and second-hand appliances. These traders felt that the products here were both cheap and of good quality. In March 2017, Toh Yong Chuan of The Straits Times wrote that the complex was "lesser-known" compared to Sim Lim Square, which had become a "key retail hub of information technology (IT) products", though he also felt that Sim Lim Tower featured a "hotchpotch of shops and offices making a real mark on the online world."

Cecilia Chow of EdgeProp reported in August 2021 that the complex's owners were looking to sell the complex in a collective sale, having formed a Collective Sale Committee two months prior. She noted that while occupancy of the complex's office units had remained "quite high" over the decades, the retail units, particularly those along secondary corridors, had "seen some vacancy emerge" in the past few years, caused by the rise of online shopping and e-commerce, as well as the COVID-19 pandemic in Singapore.
