= Rifle Range Nature Park =

Park in Bukit Timah, Singapore

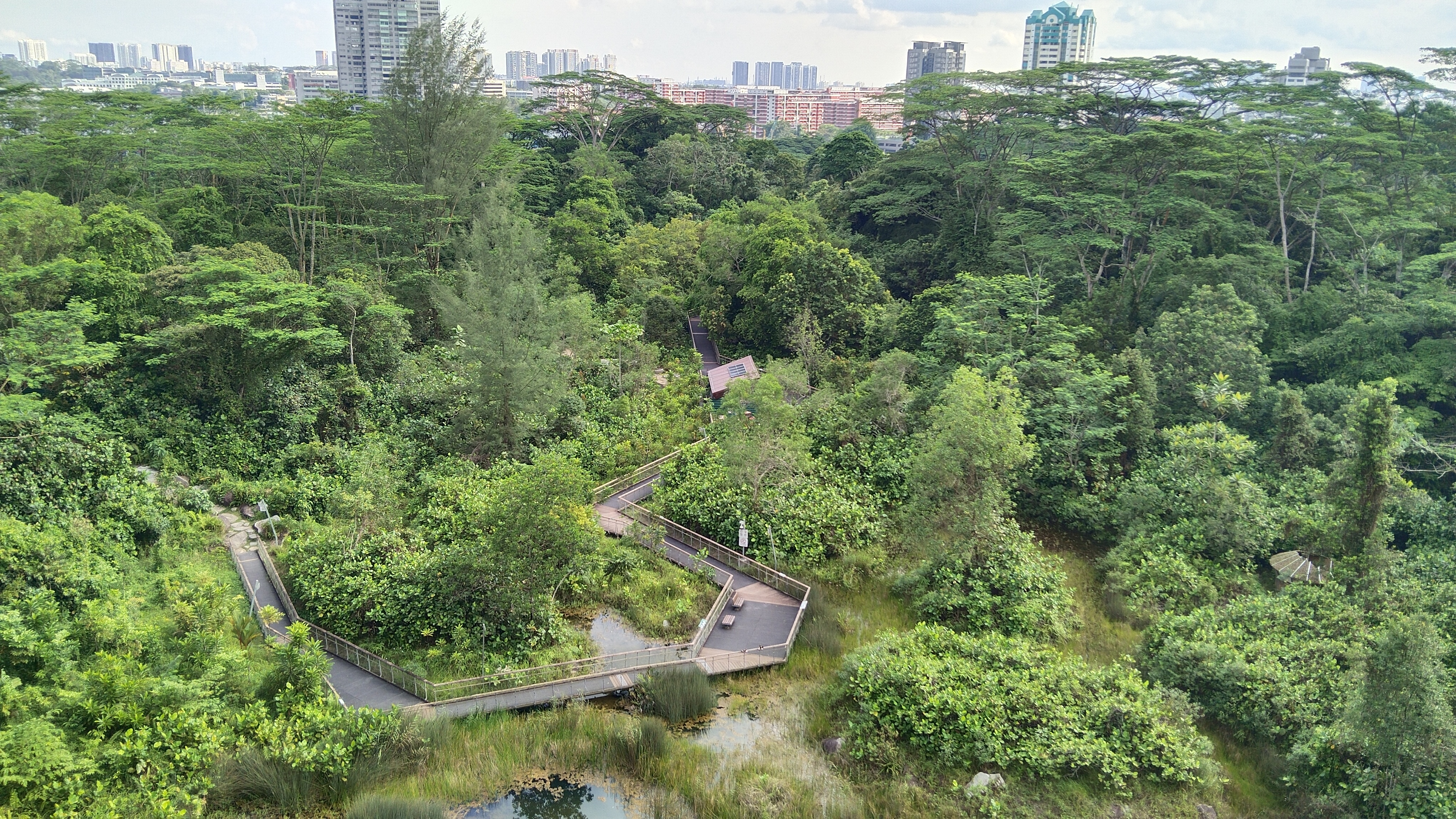
- Quarry Wetland at Rifle Range Nature Park
- Interactive map of Rifle Range Nature Park
- Type: Nature park
- Location: Singapore
- Coordinates: 1.345°N 103.783°E
- Area: 66 hectares (160 acres)
- Opened: 12 November 2022; 4 years ago
- Operator: National Parks Board
- Status: Open
- Public transit: DT5 Beauty World
- Website: www.nparks.gov.sg/gardens-parks-and-nature/parks-and-nature-reserves/rifle-range-nature-park

Rifle Range Nature Park is a nature park in Bukit Timah, Singapore. Rifle Range Nature Park was opened on 12 November 2022 and is located along Rifle Range Road and Bukit Timah Nature Reserve. Rifle Range Nature Park is also Singapore's first net positive energy nature park. Rifle Range Nature Park is the eighth park in the Central Nature Park Network. Rifle Range Nature Park was also built to protect Bukit Timah Nature Reserve.

== History ==
Rifle Range Nature Park was originally used by the old Bukit Timah Kampong and the former Sin Seng Quarry, the deepest quarry in Singapore. In 1998, the quarry ceased operations and was transformed into a freshwater habitat.

Rifle Range Nature Park was first announced in 2017 by Minister for National Development Desmond Lee.

At the park's launch, then-Deputy Prime Minister Lawrence Wong stated that, "we have expanded our green spaces and green connectors, and we have protected our nature reserves".

The nature park was opened by Lawrence Wong and Desmond Lee.

== Description ==
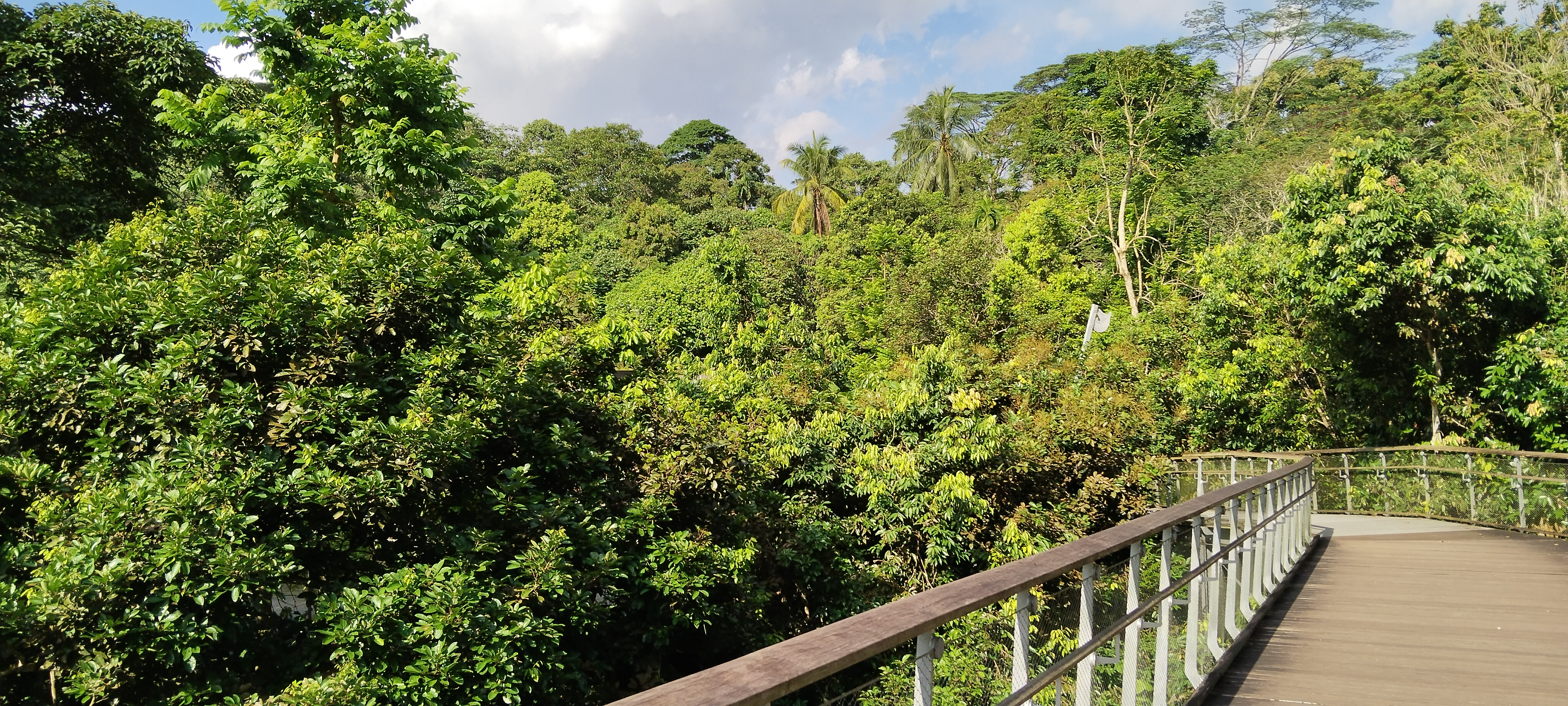
Rambai Boardwalk

=== Attractions ===
Rifle Range Nature Park has multiple attractions such as:

- Rambai Boardwalk, a 535-meter-long boardwalk
- Gliders Boardwalk, a 411-meter-long boardwalk
- Forest Exploration Trail, a 113-meter-long play area for children
- Colugo Trail, a 582-meter-long trail; located above the Quarry Wetland. The Colugo Trail also leads to a deck called the Colugo Deck that is a 31-meter-tall lookout point above the quarry.
- Banyan Trail, a 647-meter-long hiking trail
- Gaharu Trail, a 842-meter-long hiking trail

=== Transportation ===
Rifle Range Nature Park is accessible from Exit A of Beauty World MRT station by going to Beauty World Centre via an overhead bridge. It is also accessible from bus services 41, 52, 61, 77, 157, 174, 184, 852, 961, 970, and 985.

== See also ==
- List of parks in Singapore
