= Sim Lim Square =

- 森林商業中心
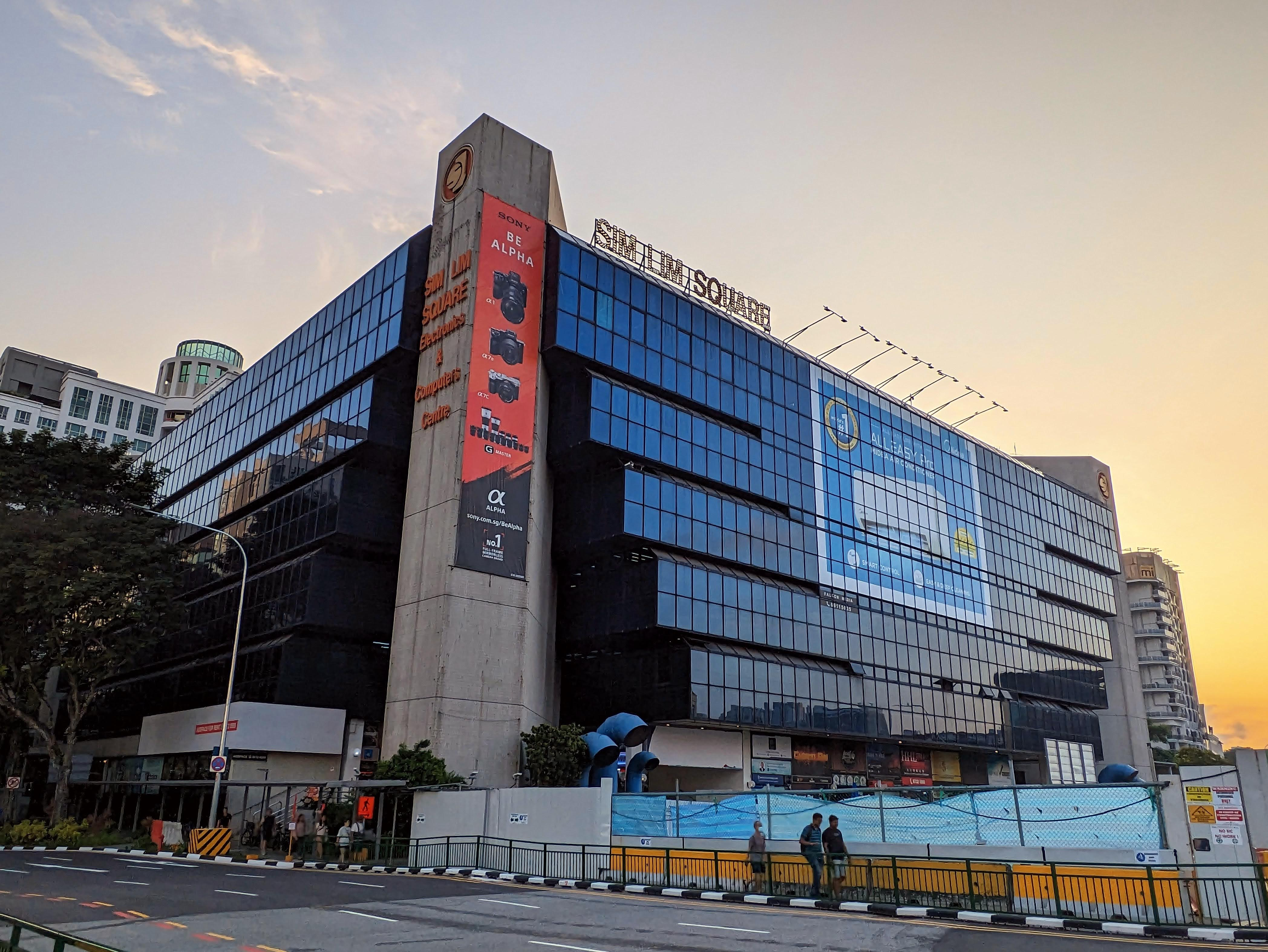
- Sim Lim Square in 2023
- Location: Singapore
- Coordinates: 1°18′11″N 103°51′11″E
- Address: 1 Rochor Canal Road, Singapore 188504
- Opened: January 1987; 39 years ago
- Num. of stores: 151
- Floors: 6 above-ground 2 basement floors
- Public transit: DT13 Rochor
- Website: www.simlimsquare.com.sg

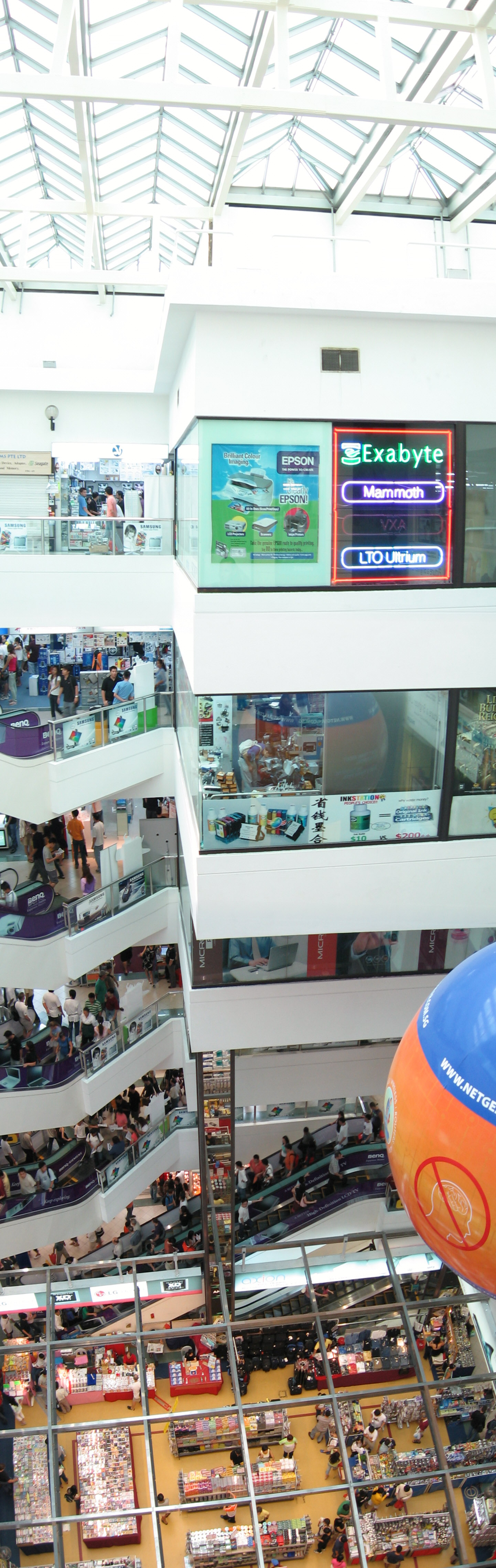
Sim Lim Square has six stories of shops, offering mainly electronic and IT products.

Sim Lim Square (from Min Nan 森林 (lit. "forest"), Pe̍h-ōe-jī: Sim-lîm), known in Chinese as 森林商業中心 (Pinyin: Sēn Lín Shāngyè Zhōngxīn) and commonly referred to as SLS, is a large retail complex in Singapore that offers a wide variety of electronic goods and services including cameras, phones, video cameras, and computer parts and servicing.

Located at 1 Rochor Canal Road, SLS is situated in central Singapore, near historic features such as the Little India district and one of the earliest HDB developments. SLS is accessible via MRT at Rochor MRT station of Downtown Line.

After reports of several incidents of fraud faced by tourists, the Ministry of Foreign Affairs of the People's Republic of China and Vietnamese newspapers published a warning about purchasing electronics from Sim Lim Square and the dubious tactics of the shops there.

== History ==
The complex was initially planned as a shopping and office complex, and began construction in 1983. In 1985, the complex was converted into a shopping centre dedicated to electronics and electrical goods, and many of the shop spaces in the complex were bought by shop-owners from Sim Lim Tower. The complex was completed in January 1987.

== Shop types ==
The complex is a six-story building with a range of varied electronics supply and service shops. The centre operates away from the main shopping areas of Singapore and as such can be seen as an area for bargains to be gained with cheap and inexpensive goods. Examples of this can include phones, laptops, computer parts, cameras and other electronic devices.

CASE (Consumer Association of Singapore) often publishes advisory against rogue vendors in SLS.

== Scams ==
Many shops in Sim Lim Square, particularly those on lower levels selling games, cameras and mobiles, resort to scam tactics to reap higher profits. The most recent case of Jover Chew Chiew Loon involved a 33-month prison sentence. In early 2008, some SLS shops were caught by the police for selling counterfeit copies of Microsoft Windows.

=== Infamy and redress ===
In April 2013, after Sim Lim Square's management put up lists of recalcitrant shops as a warning to shoppers, some of those stores resorted to shrinking or removing their names from their signboards, or even changing their name. The lists have also been ripped off by unknown culprits. It was reported a month later that retailers had secretly charged extra amounts to customers' credit cards as taxes or transaction fees.

Malaysian diver Ooi Tze Liang, who was participating in the 2014 Singapore Fina Diving Grand Prix, reported paying over S$4,800 for two iPhone 6 phones, despite being quoted a price of $2,500. Ooi was unaware of the cost when he signed a contract for a warranty package amounting to over $2,300. Ooi said that the shopkeeper refused to hand over the phones unless the payment was made. Ooi paid up instead of cancelling the warranty contract, which would have cost him $800. It was reported by The New Paper that there was "little that can be done by the authorities" as the customer signed a contract.

On 4 December, police raided and shuttered two mobile phone retailers, Gadget Terminal, and De.Mac Gadget/Mobile Apps, as part of investigations following reports lodged against them.

The impact on the mall's reputation over customer scams was so serious that in November 2014, management of Sim Lim Square appealed to the authorities to "take a tough stand against the recalcitrant retailers".

=== Mobile Air controversy ===
14 complaints of impropriety were lodged against Mobile Air between July and September 2014, while 28 charges were brought onto the owner Jover Chew of Mobile Air, of which he pleaded eventually guilty to 12 of them. $12,199 was refunded to 26 victims. Most of the charges involve abetment by conspiracy to cheat customers and criminal intimidation of customers. 2 cases were widely covered by the press and social media:

On 24 September, a Chinese citizen, Miss Zou, bought an iPhone 6 Plus from the store, but unknowingly signed a contract for two years of "insurance" costing $2,400, bringing the price of the phone to $4,000. After haggling, Zou paid $3,000. At the time, online Apple stores were selling a similar product for less than $1,500. The next day, Zou filed a complaint with the Small Claims Tribunal, which ruled that the shop should refund her $1,010. On 28 October, Mobile Air returned Zou and her aunt the $1,010, however, the money was returned in coins of all denominations, including five cents, weighing a total of 18 kg. Zou and her aunt had to pick up the coins from the floor and count them. Mobile Air owner Jover Chew Chiew Loon refused to answer why he had paid in coins, instead blaming Zou and her aunt for being difficult customers. Following this incident, CASE investigated the shop after noting the aforementioned 14 complaints of impropriety against Mobile Air.

On 3 November, Mr Pham Van Thoai, a Vietnamese tourist, paid S$950 for an iPhone 6 from Mobile Air. However, Mobile air staff refused to let Pham leave with the phone unless he paid an additional $1,500 in warranty fees. Pham had signed for an agreement, but failed to scrutinise it due to his lack of fluency in English. After the intervention of the police and CASE, Pham was refunded $400, but did not receive the iPhone, incurring a loss of $550. Pham said that his monthly earnings as a factory worker amounted to about $200. This case sparked nationwide sympathy and outrage in Singapore after the publishing of a photo of a tearful Pham and the online circulation of a video of him begging on his knees for a refund. The backlash resulted in the personal particulars and photos of Mobile Air owner Jover Chew being circulated online.

In response, a crowdfunding campaign was started on IndieGoGo to buy Pham an iPhone 6 by Mr Gabriel Kang, a Singaporean technology entrepreneur. The campaign saw over a thousand donations and raised over US$11,000. Despite the campaign, Pham said that a businessman had already donated $550 to him and that he had bought a phone with it, so he did not want to take more than what he lost. As a result of the campaign, which far exceeded the initial target of US$1,350, Kang presented Pham with an iPhone before Pham left Singapore. Pham refused the iPhone as "a matter of principle", but accepted gifts of local cuisine from Kang. The remaining money from the campaign would be awarded to portioned out, some going to 20 verified victims of mobile phone scams in Singapore, some going to charity and some reserved for Pham to have another holiday in Singapore.

After closure and injunction of Mobile Air, Chew is now serving a 33 months sentence, while Kam and three other employees are now serving a 4 to 14 months imprisonment for their roles in the scam that saw unprecedented success in raising awareness via the social media and internet platform.

== See also ==
- Funan DigitaLife Mall
