= Beauty World Market =

Former market in Bukit Timah, Singapore

- 美世界 (Chinese)
- Location within Singapore
- 1°20′30.0″N 103°46′29.8″E
- Location: Bukit Timah, Singapore

History
- Founded: July 1947; 79 years ago
- Founder: Giam Kok Eng
- Built: September 1944; 81 years ago
- Built for: amusement park
- Original use: marketplace
- Demolished: 1984; 42 years ago

Site notes
- Current use: Parking lots

Beauty World Market was an open-air market that was opened in July 1947 in Bukit Timah, Singapore. It was located at the junction of Upper Bukit Timah Road and Jalan Jurong Kechil. Just next to it was Beauty World Town, another shopping place that was opened in 1962. It was located at the junction of Upper Bukit Timah Road and Chun Tin Road. Both shopping areas were completely demolished by 1984 due to frequent fire outbreaks. The original site of the market had since been occupied by two parking lots and Beauty World MRT Station.

== History ==
- 1800s: Bukit Timah Village was formed by the early Chinese Gambier and Pepper Planters and farmers. Another name of the village was “Beh Chia Loh Boey” which meant “terminal of the horse carriage way” in Hokkien. This was because, at that time, Bukit Timah Road ended at where the village was and beyond the village was the Bukit Timah Hill jungle.
- The 1920s: An open-air market called Bukit Timah Market existed along Jalan Jurong Kechil. The market was mostly used by the rubber and pineapple plantation workers living in the village at that time.
- 1941: The original site of the market was badly bombed during the bombing of Singapore by the Japanese warplanes in December 1941.
- 1944 - 1946: During the Japanese occupation of Singapore, an amusement park called Tua Tong Ah (大东亚) or Greater East Asia Amusement Park, was built by two Hokchia businessmen, Yuan and Yan at the bombed site and was opened in September 1944. It was a gambling center. The park was named after Greater East Asia Co-Prosperity Sphere propagated by Japanese invaders and hence, it was called "Tua Tong Ah" which means Greater East Asia in Hokkien. As initiated by Japanese, Tua Tong Ah was built as a gambling centre to reduce rapid inflation. The park had 20 gambling stalls, roughly a dozen coffee shops with "coffee girls", six general stores, a photo studio, a movie theatre known as Tiong Hwa Cinema, hawker centre, restaurant, dance hall and several wayang and getai stages. After the war in 1945, the amusement park was allowed to operate for another year with a temporary license granted by the returning British. However, gambling was banned and the amusement park's popularity eventually declined and fell into disrepair.
- 1947: The proprietor, Giam Kok Eng, sought permission from the British authorities and converted it to Beauty World Market (美世界) and was opened in July 1947. The word "Beauty" of Beauty World was named after the daughter of Mr. Giam, while the word "World" was named after other amusement parks in Singapore such as "Happy World", "New World" and "Great World". Temporary stalls were made of zinc or attap shacks. There were stall canvases for the shops to provide shade and to prevent rain from getting onto the displayed items.
- 1962: A new shopping area called Beauty World Town was built beside Beauty World Market. Stalls in Beauty World Town also had zinc roof. From various old photos of Beauty World Town, it could be seen that many shops had doors made of metal wire or wood to keep the shop safe at night. Each shop had a name panel pasted at the top center too.
- 1968: 140 hawkers at the Beauty World Market and Bukit Timah Village market registered to Hawkers Department of Ministry of the Environment to move to a new wet market and hawker centre called Bukit Timah Food Centre with more hygienic environment. It was located beside the old Bukit Timah Market and it still exists on the present day. Bukit Timah village has a population size of around 4,500 and had about 500 houses. The villagers were mostly Chinese shop owners and laborers.
- 1970s: Stalls at the Beauty World Market kept catching fire due to complex electricity cables all tangled around the stores.
- 1975: The Singapore government acquired the land.
- 1977: Singapore government announced plans to relocate the tenants and shopkeepers to the nearby sites.
- 1983: Due to the frequent fire outbreaks, both Beauty World Market and Town were closed down in December 1983.
- 1984: By January 1984 many stalls were relocated to Bukit Timah Shopping Centre and Beauty World Centre located across Upper Bukit Timah Road, while some moved to a new town in Clementi. Later in July the last major fire occurred at Beauty World Town and about 20 vacant shophouses was burned down, including the 40 year-old Tiong Hwa Cinema. Both Beauty World Market and Town were eventually demolished.
- 1990s: Two car parks occupied part of the original site of Beauty World Market and Town.

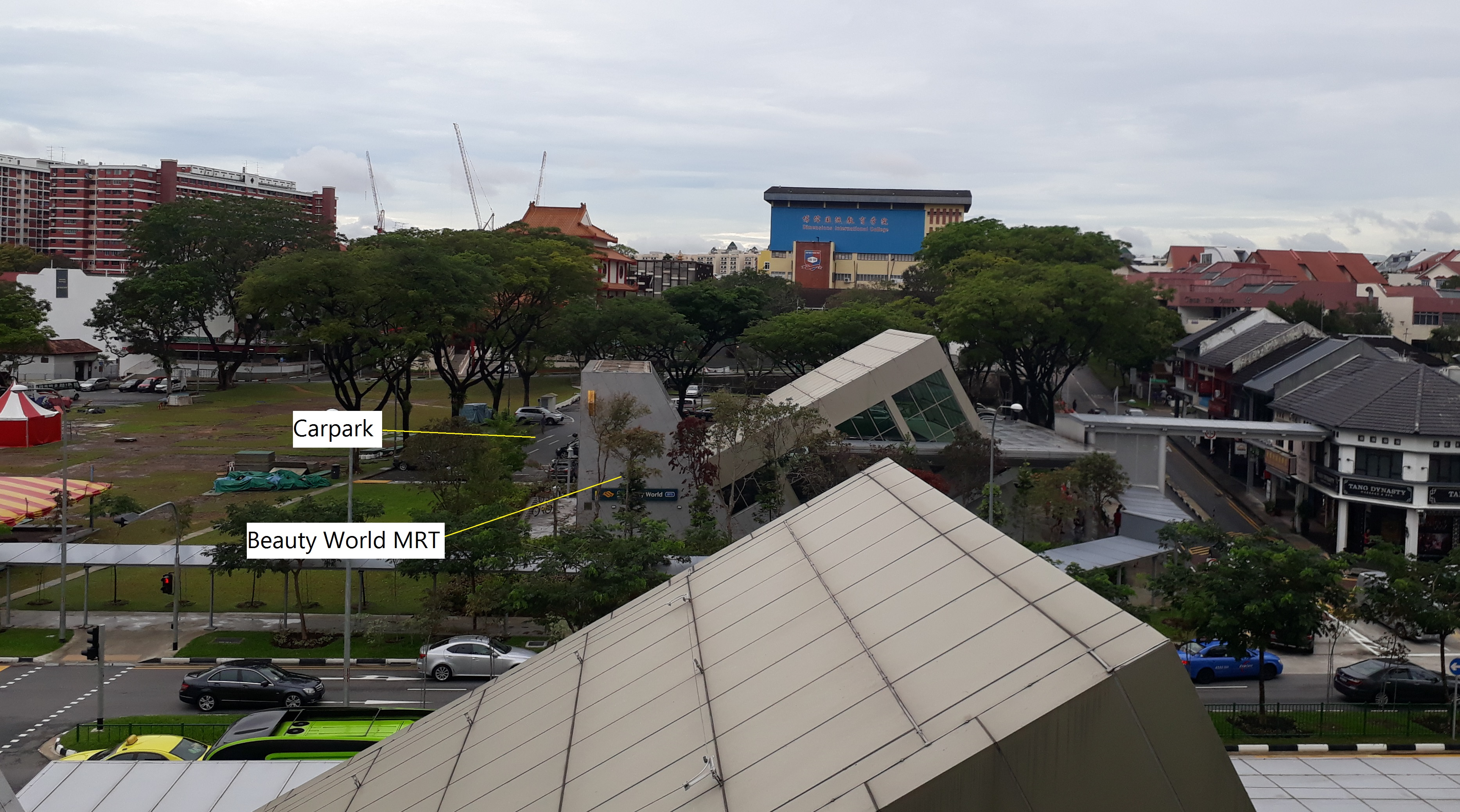
Original site of Beauty World Market and Beauty World Town is now occupied by carpark and Beauty World MRT Station.

- 2015: Beauty World MRT station opened and also occupied part of the original site of Beauty World Market and Town.
