= Beauty World Centre =

Building complex in Singapore

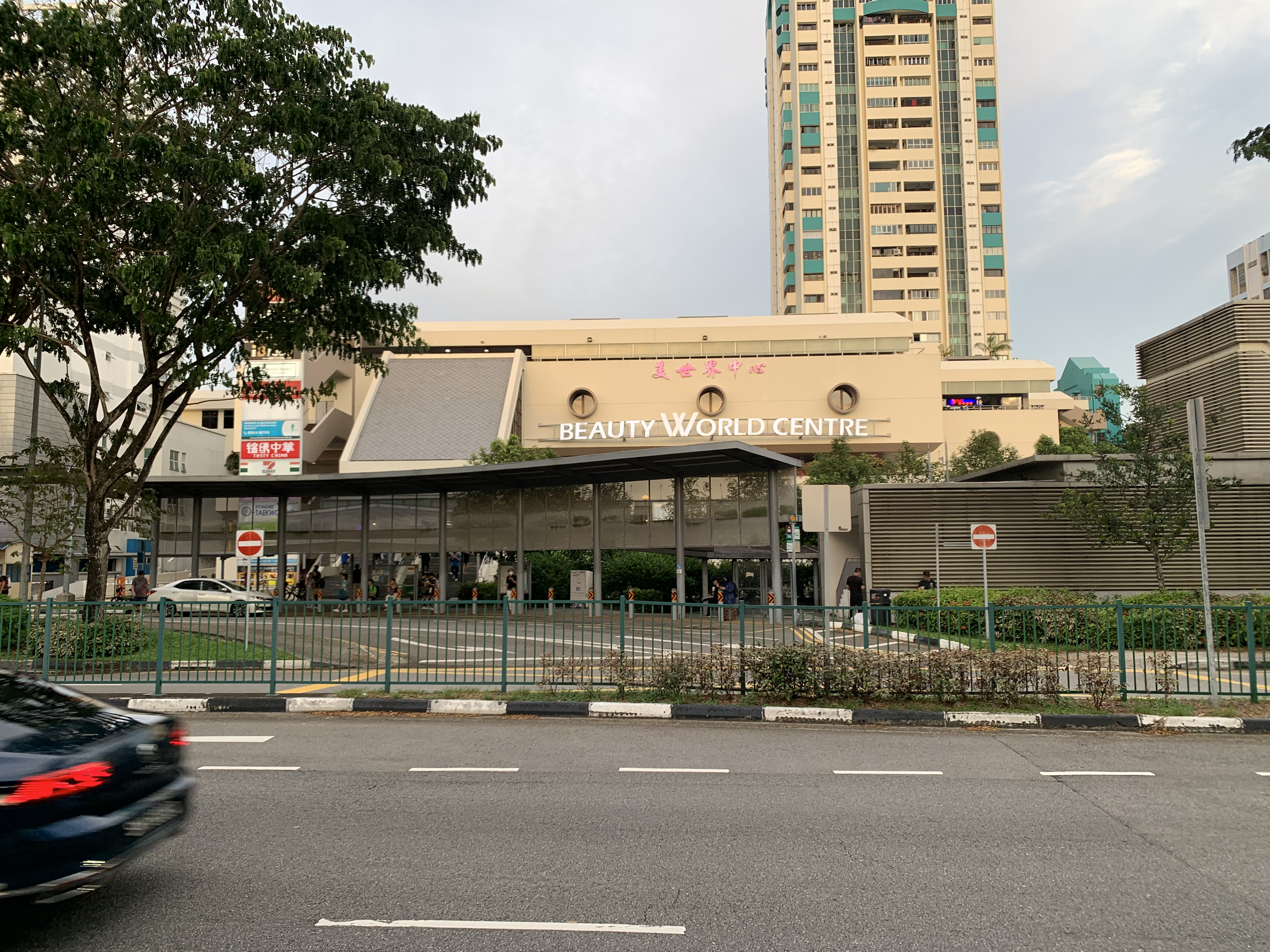
- Location: Singapore
- Coordinates: 1.3420°N 103.7737°E
- Opened: 2 January 1984

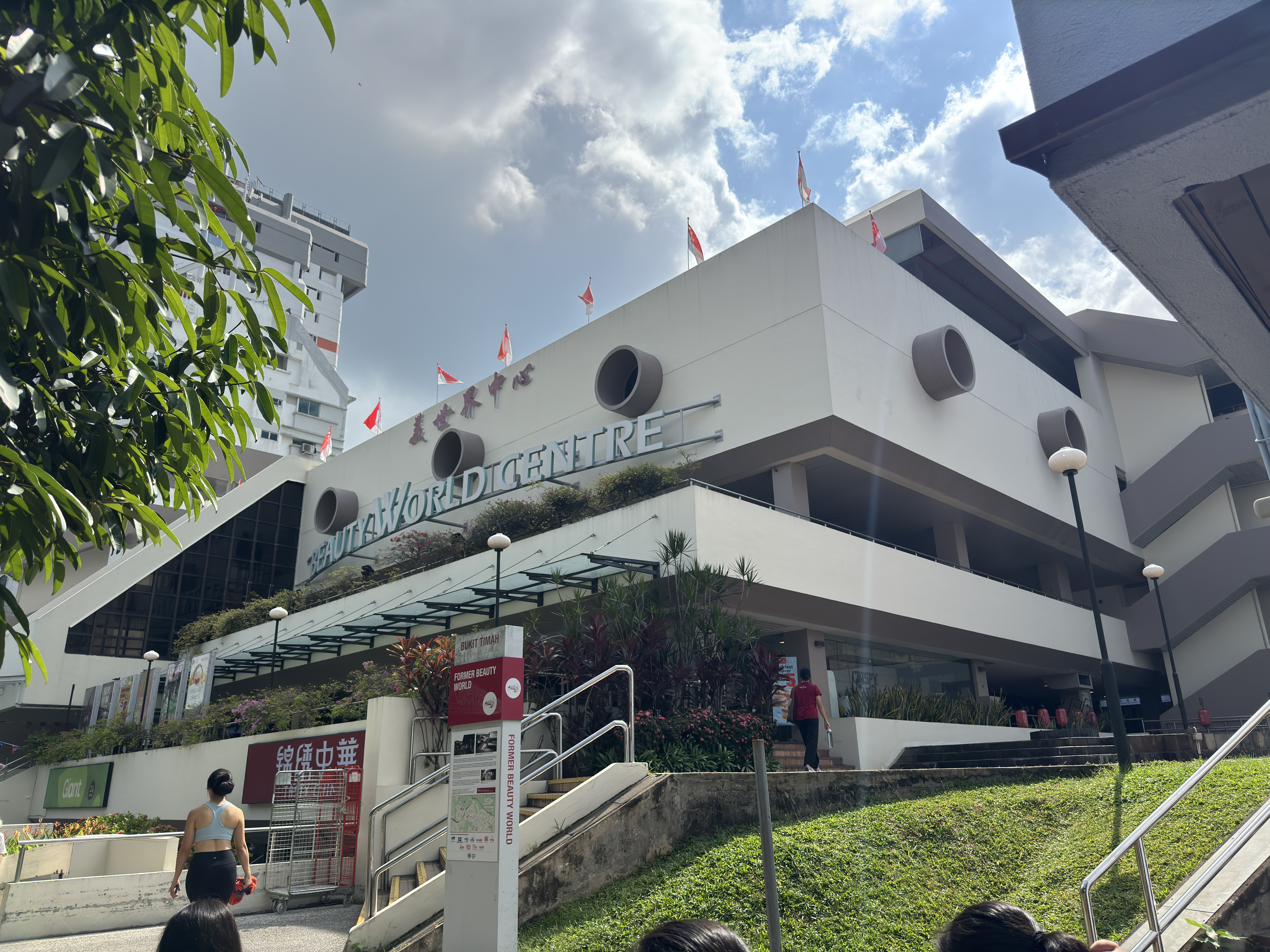
Beauty World Centre's retail podium in 2006.

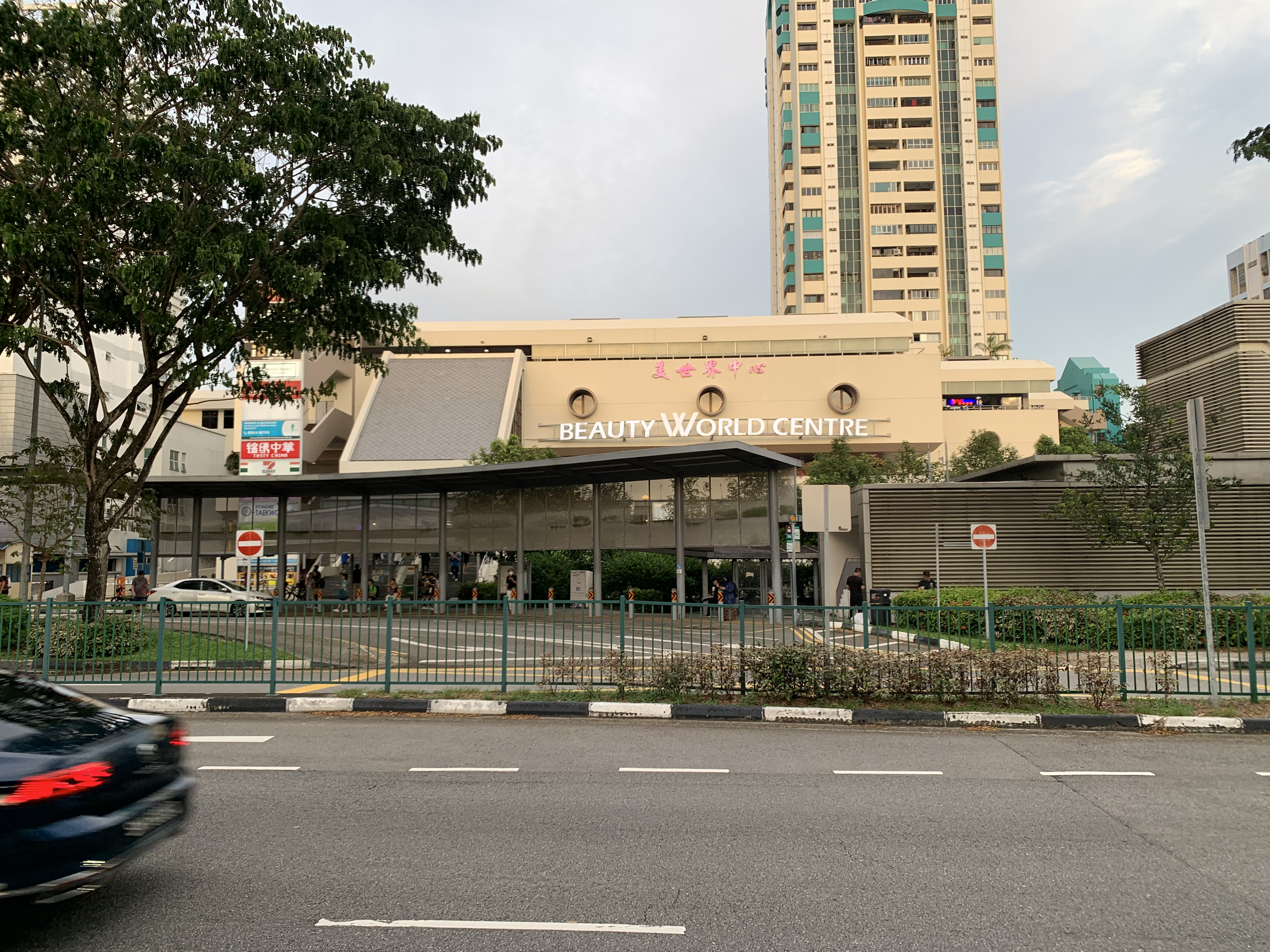
The complex with its residential tower in 2025.

Beauty World Centre is a housing and shopping complex in between Upper Bukit Timah Road and Jalan Anak Bukit in Bukit Timah, Singapore. Announced in 1979 as the Anak Bukit Resettlement Centre, it was built by the Urban Redevelopment Authority (URA) to relocate the tenants of the soon-to-be-demolished Beauty World Town. The complex, comprising a retail podium, a carpark and a residential tower, was completed as the Beauty World Centre in 1983 and officially opened in January 1984. The retail podium included an open-air hawker centre, the Beauty World Food Centre, which become popular in of itself. In the years following its completion, it was considered the most successful complex of its kind built by the authority.

In 1989, the authority transferred ownership of the building to a newly-established subsidiary, Pidemco, which carried out major renovations for the retail podium in 1993 and renamed the residential tower Bukit Timah View before selling it off in the mid-1990s. Pidemco sold off the mall to its tenants in 1998. In the years that followed, the mall suffered from increasing competition from newer malls and ageing tenants, and has since become "cobwebbed", though the Beauty World Food Centre has remained popular.

== History ==
=== Background and construction ===
The complex was built to rehouse the stallholders of Beauty World Town, which had been slated for demolition after three separate major fires in the last decade. The Singapore Monitor reported that these tenants were concerned with the fact that rent at the new complex would be significantly higher than what they had previously paid. In January 1983, they started a five-month-long clearance sale in preparation for the move. In May 1983, Ang Peng Hwa reported that all of the 170 shopkeepers of Beauty World Town, as well as half of its 60 hawkers, would be relocated to the centre upon its opening. He wrote that despite the higher rent, they "generally welcome[d] the rehousing due to the fire threat, particularly due to the fact that most of them were not insured.

The complex, comprising a five-storey retail podium and a 20-storey residential tower resting on a carpark, was first announced by the URA as the Anak Bukit Resettlement Centre in July 1979. The residential tower was to comprise 80 three-bedroom apartment units, and the retail podium was to have a department store, in addition to regular shops and service stores. The tower and the podium were to have separate entrances. There was initially to be a landscaped roof deck with food stalls and a "gourmet centre", as well as pet shops. It was to be air-conditioned, serviced by lifts and escalators, and have an "attractive" architectural finish and layout. It was one of several "better quality" complexes announced in that period by the URA and it was intended to be "comparable to that of a private-sector shopping complex." Previous resettlement developments had "cheaper finishes" and were largely unsuccessful as a result. The complex was then scheduled for completion in late 1982. The cost of construction was then estimated to be around $26 million. This was reportedly the first resettlement centre by the URA to include apartments. Construction began in March 1981. In January 1982, the retail podium was scheduled for completion that August, while the residential tower was to be completed toward the end of 1983.

In January 1983, the podium had been scheduled for completion sometime later in the year, while the residential tower was slated for opening by November. By then, the project had been renamed Beauty World Centre. The Singapore Monitor reported in March that the complex as a whole "fast taking shape", and that it was set to be complete by the end of the year. The building was "ready for occupation" by early December, with the remaining tenants at Beauty World being required to move out by the very end of the year. Those who could not afford to set up shop in Beauty World Centre instead moved to Clementi. At its opening, the retail podium had more than 160 shops built around a naturally-lit atrium, as well as seven kiosks, seven eating houses, 30 hawker stalls and an open-air hawker centre, the Beauty World Food Centre, occupying the fourth floor, with all other floors being air-conditioned. The first three floors of the podium were reserved for the former tenants of Beauty World Town. The hawker centre was made open-air in an attempt to "recreate the charming open-air makan-stall atmosphere of the old place", as part of a recently introduced URA policy which required that every new commercial centre built by the authority have "a character of its own." The six-and-a-half-storey carpark had a capacity for 261 vehicles. Each of the residential tower's apartments featured a similar layout, with three bedrooms and balcony access. Construction cost an estimated 45$ million. The complex featured glass canopies and coloured roof tiles. The URA declared that the architectural finish was of "high quality." The shopping centre also featured wide walkways.

=== Opening and initial years ===
The complex was officially opened on 2 January 1984 by Chor Yeok Eng, the Member of Parliament for the Bukit Timah Single Member Constituency. To coincide with the ceremony, the complex held a "big eat-out". By then, most of the last shopkeepers of Beauty World Town had moved in, along with the Beauty World Town Shop Association, which then renamed itself the Beauty World Centre Merchants' Association. The hawkers were to move in in March or April. However, the Singapore Monitor reported in February that business at the centre had been "stagnant" since the tenants first moved in despite the much higher rent, and that the tenants blamed this on the URA, claiming that it was "only concerned" with relocating them and had failed to ensure the success of the complex, which then lacked any major draw. In April, it was announced that the apartments would be put up for rent, becoming the first URA-built flats to be rented out. The apartments were then still "undergoing final touch-ups" and were scheduled for completion by the following month. Ang Peng Hwa opined that a significant portion of the renters would likely be Japanese expatriates as the complex was located near the Japanese School Singapore and the rent in the complex's district was lower than in surrounding districts. The apartments were to be rented on two-year leases, though renters would be able to renew the lease for another year. The decision to rent the apartments was attributed to the "still depressed" property market.

By the demolition of Beauty World in May 1984, around 275 of its shopkeepers had moved into Beauty World Centre in total. In the same month, it was reported that the reception to putting the apartments up for rent had been "good". On 16 May, the URA held its 10th anniversary exhibition at the complex in an attempt to promote the complex. This was the first URA exhibition to be held outside of its offices. David Tan of The Straits Times reported in October that haggling was still practised at the complex. By then, the complex had 50 food stalls in total. Businesses at the shopping centre then included "many" goldsmiths, barbers, a surgery and clinic, a dentist, as well as shops selling shoes, clothing, toys, furniture, electronics, lights, medicine and flowers. Tan opined that the products and services offered at the centre were "high quality" and "inexpensive" and recommended the hawker centre.

In May 1985, The Straits Times reported that the complex had been "voted the most successful URA centre." From February 1985 to February 1986, the occupancy rate for the residential tower "plunged" from 75% to 34%. This was attributed to the high rental rate, which had been set "at the height of the property market", and was now reportedly 50% higher than the rent in surrounding residential developments. As such, rent was cut by about 30% in March 1986. The URA announced in August that they would be replacing the carpark's coupon parking system with a flat-rate entry fee. This was in response to complaints from the complex's tenants, who argued that the previous system "[put] them at a disadvantage" as shoppers preferred shopping at malls with carparks with the latter system. The complex's carpark was one of four selected for a pilot project testing the barrier parking system. The project started in early 1987, and the URA announced in July 1988 that the project had been successful.

The mall had its heyday in the 1980s and the early 1990s, during which Malaysians formed a significant portion of its clientele, in addition to the residents of Bukit Timah, Jurong, Woodlands and Boon Lay.

=== Pidemco ownership ===
In January 1989, the URA announced that all of its properties, including Beauty World Centre, would be transferred over to a newly-created subsidiary called Pidemco Holdings. Genevieve Kwek of The New Paper reported in April that prices at the mall were "comparable" to suburban shopping complexes and that the complex was "highly accessible" due to its proximity to the Bukit Timah Expressway and the Pan Island Expressway. She felt that the shopping centre was a "living memory" and that the variety of products sold matched that of Beauty World. She noted that, like the market, the mall "[drew] the bargain-hunters", though it lacked "the fires, the gambling and the gangsters" that the market was also known for. From September to October, the Beauty World Centre Merchants' Association held the 24-day-long 1989 China Beijing Kites Exhibition Fair at the complex.

In November 1990, John Tan of The Business Times reported that business at the complex had been "sluggish" due to the completion of the Pan-Island Expressway, as well as the depreciation of the Malaysian ringgit, though the complex remained "successful". There were then rumours spreading amongst the centre's tenants that Pidemco planned to "[extensively retrofit]" the complex "to the status of Parkway Parade", which would lead to evictions and higher rentals. In response, Pidemco claimed that there were "no plans at present to retrofit Beauty World Centre or evict any tenants." Tan noted that while Pidemco was then "conducting a market survey of the area." However, he wrote that it was possible that the renovation works, if they were to occur, would be minor, as the surrounding area was "too small" to support an "upmarket" complex like Parkway Parade and the higher rentals would force tenants out. Pidemco Holdings announced in March 1991 that they would be putting the complex, then valued at over $80 million, up for sale. The World Champion Table Training Centre was established on the third floor in 1992 with three tables and Jiang Jialiang as its coach. It officially opened on 12 December, though classes had already started the month before. Early response was reportedly "very good".

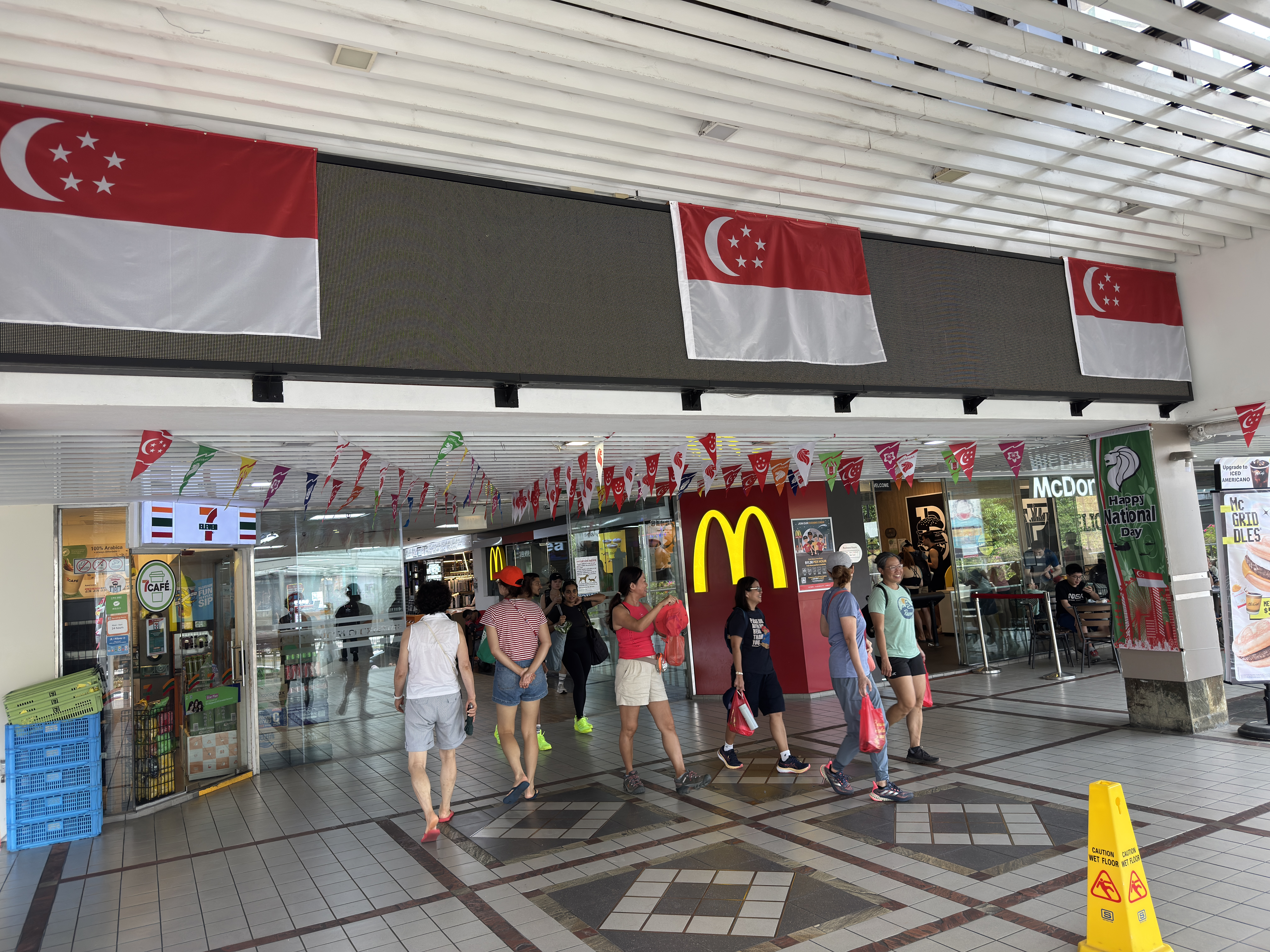
The mall's McDonald's outlet in 2025.

In 1993, Pidemco initiated major renovation works at the mall, which were to "improve the trade mix" of its tenants and to take place in three phases. The first two saw the upgrading and expansion of the shops on the basement to second floors, which had their layout reconfigured, and the hawker centre, while the third involved further renovations on the hawker centre as well as more general renovations for the complex as a whole. The first two phases were completed by November, after which the hawker centre's capacity increased to around 50 stalls, though work on the final phase had yet to start then. Alongside the renovations, outlets of NTUC Fairprice, Watsons, McDonald's, Pertama and the Funworld Family Entertainment Centre opened at the complex. The Business Times reported that the mall, which had an occupancy rate of around 98%, was then "popular".

Pidemco announced in October 1994 that it sought to sell all apartment units in the residential tower to sitting tenants. In January, it was reported that most of the units in the tower, which had since been renamed Bukit Timah View, had been vacated, and that Pidemco would be selling them later that year after renovations works, which were to involve the installation of a clubhouse and swimming pool. By then, Pidemco was no longer under the URA and had become one the largest corporations in the country. The residential tower was sold sometime in this period. In August 1998, it was announced that Pidemco had sold Beauty World Centre to 194 tenants through the Beauty World Centre Merchants Association after six to nine months of negotiations. This was part of Pidemco's attempt to "rationalise [its] property portfolio" and "focus mainly on prime projects."

=== Decline and MRT station ===
Around the mid-1990s, the gap between the value of the Singapore dollar and the Malaysian ringgit continued to widen, and fewer Malaysians came to the country to shop, leading to the mall's loss of its Malaysian patrons. In 1998, Elizabeth Gwee of The Straits Times named the "once-popular" complex as an example of the "shopping centres that time has forgotten", noting that it was mainly surviving off of regulars and those looking to bargain. Business had declined by at least 20% in the past five years and "look set to go down even more." After the 1990s, newer malls in the Clementi and Jurong East began to eat away at the complex's clientele. By April 2002, the retail podium was reportedly "dead" outside of the lunch rush. Businesses such as maid agencies, dentists, clinics and beauty salons had begun to pop up at the complex, as well as in surrounding shopping centres such as the neighbouring Beauty World Plaza and Bukit Timah Shopping Centre. This was partially attributed to the complex's age, as well as the rerouting of nearby bus routes. The URA announced that it planned to rejuvenate the area. The authority claimed that it sought to make the district, known as Anak Bukit, "the next mini-Orchard Road or Holland Village." However, it was announced in March 2004 that the URA had scrapped the plan. In August 2011, Melissa Kok of The Business Times reported that there had a "Korea Town" had sprung up in the area, including at the complex, as a result of several South Koreans moving into the area, as well as the Singapore Korean International School moving into the neighbourhood.

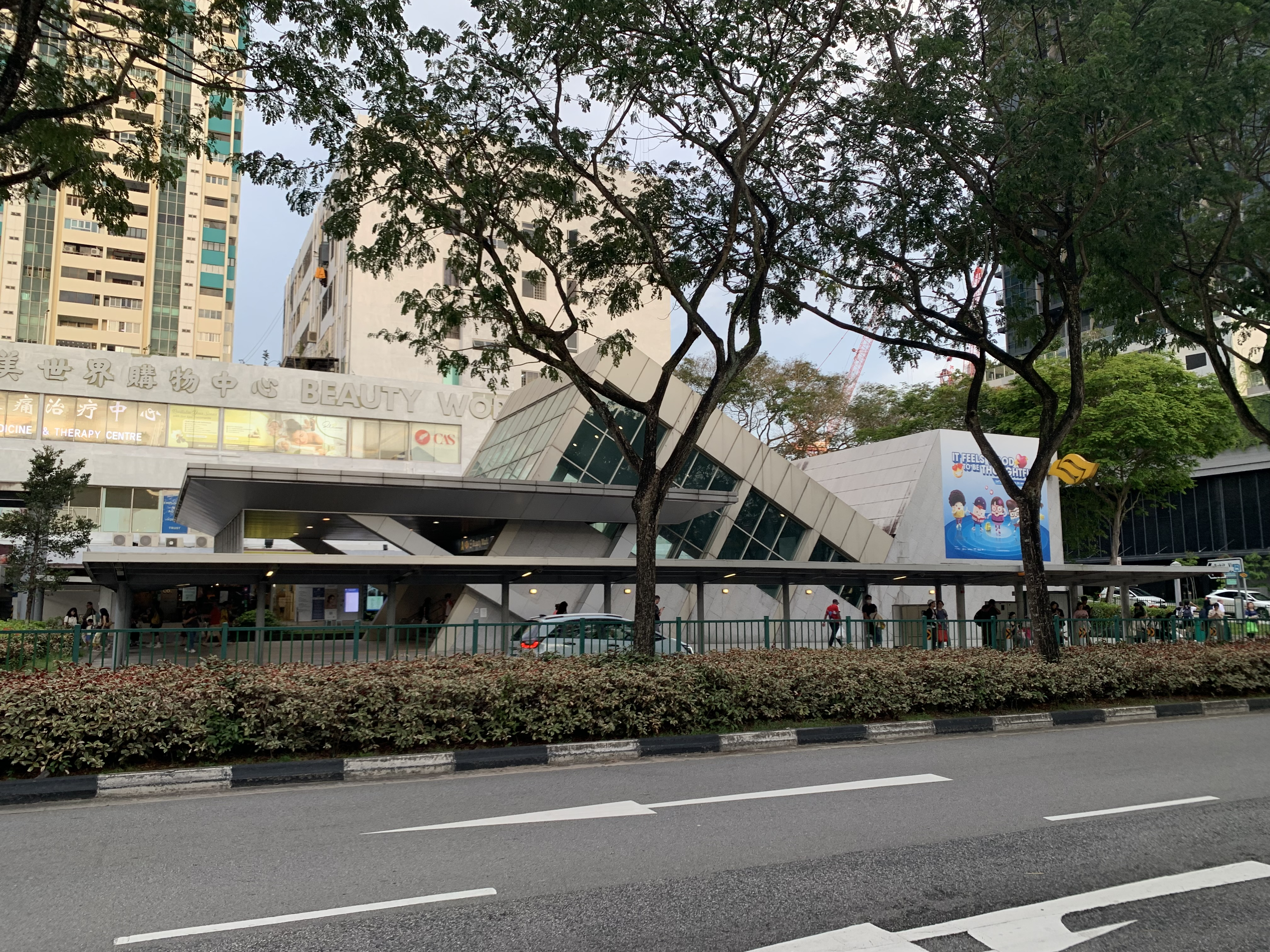
The Beauty World MRT station entrance in front of the mall.

In December 2015, the Beauty World MRT station opened in front of Beauty World Centre and Beauty World Plaza. It was initially expected that the station would "breathe new life" into the mall, particularly due to one of the station's entrances being located directly in front of the mall. Rent at the mall increased by 50% shortly after the station was announced, and several new stores opened in anticipation. Mo Meiyan of the Lianhe Zaobao reported in October 2012 that the mall was still bustling on the weekends despite being "quiet" on weekdays, with the mall now also having numerous children's education centres and stores serving the local Korean community. However, he also noted that many of the older shopkeepers had already shut down their stores and rented out their units, and many of the remaining shopkeepers were hoping for an en-bloc sale. He argued that even with the MRT station, the mall's tenants needed to further promote the mall for it to be revitalised. The new MRT station was seen as an opportunity for the mall to "rejuvenate itself", either through a facelift or through "[capitalising] on its retro look", having "retained an old-school charm, devoid of the crowds and fast-food outlets seen at most mega-malls." Knight Frank, the estate agency managing the shopping centre, stated that they were looking into a potential facelift. The opening did increase footfall, particularly for the hawker centre, which had 40% more customers on the weekends by January 2016. However, the station's opening did not ultimately have a lasting, significant effect on the mall.

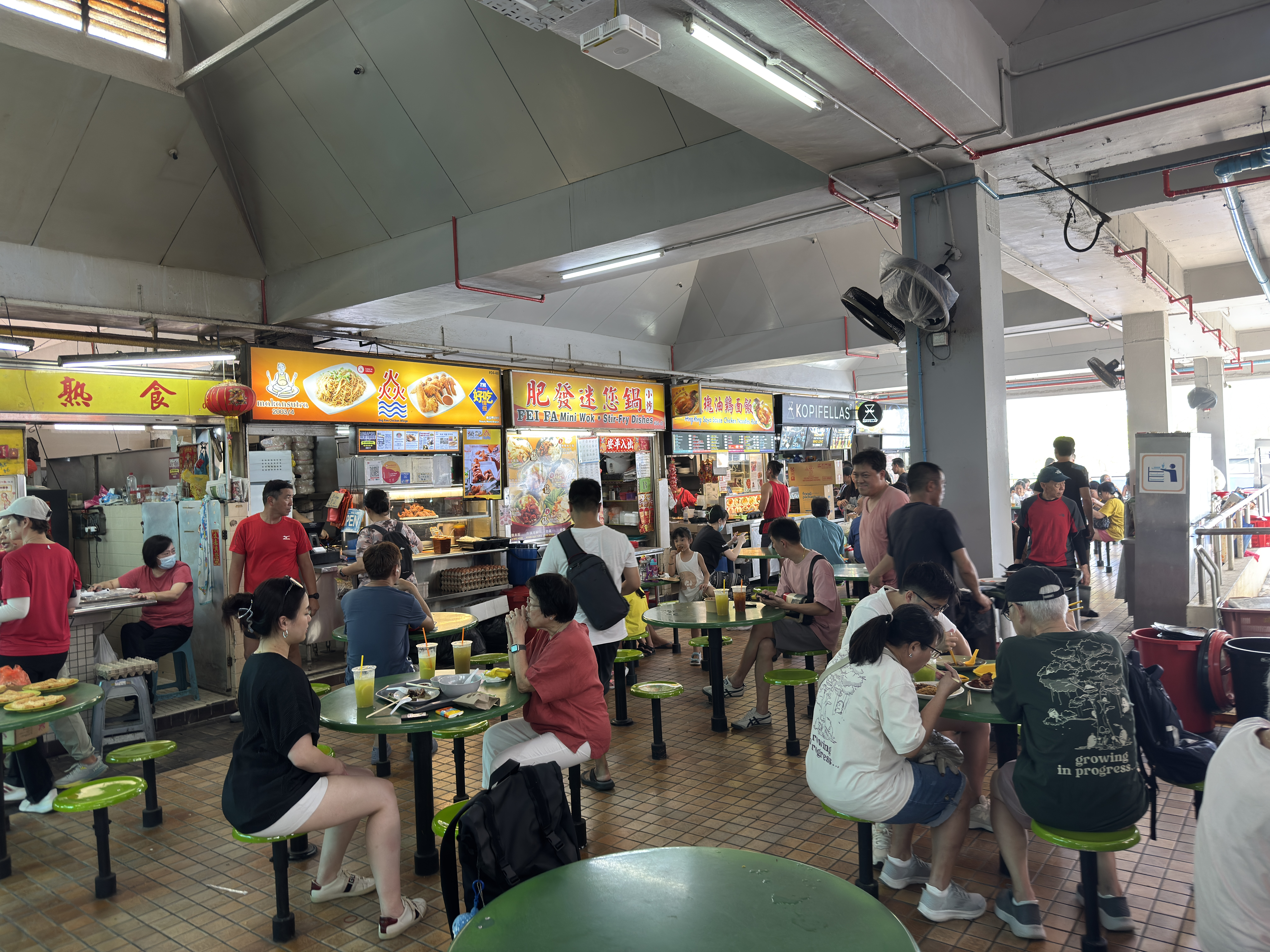
The open-air hawker centre in 2025.

In April 2016, it was announced that a "mystery buyer" had offered $17.5 million through Propnex Realty for the Beauty World Food Centre, which then had 41 stalls, though the deal had yet to be finalised. It was reported that the buyer might have been interested in converting the centre into an air-conditioned food court, and that most of the ageing stallholders had agreed to the deal as they lacked successors. Several major coffee shop chains in the country had previously stated that they were looking into acquiring the hawker centre, though a deal never materialised. However, the hawker centre was strata-titled, and seven stallholders opposed the sale. In response, the centre's trustees sent an application to the High Court of Singapore, seeking the ability to go ahead with the deal. The High Court ruled against the trustees in February 2018, finding that they had "fallen short of their duty to obtain the best price for the stall holders", and ordered them to pay $7,000 to the seven stallholders. With the deal having fallen through, several of the centre's hawkers announced that they would be looking into selling their recipes. It was reported that the hawker centre then "[drew] a strong crowd at lunchtime of office workers, students, retirees and even tourists."

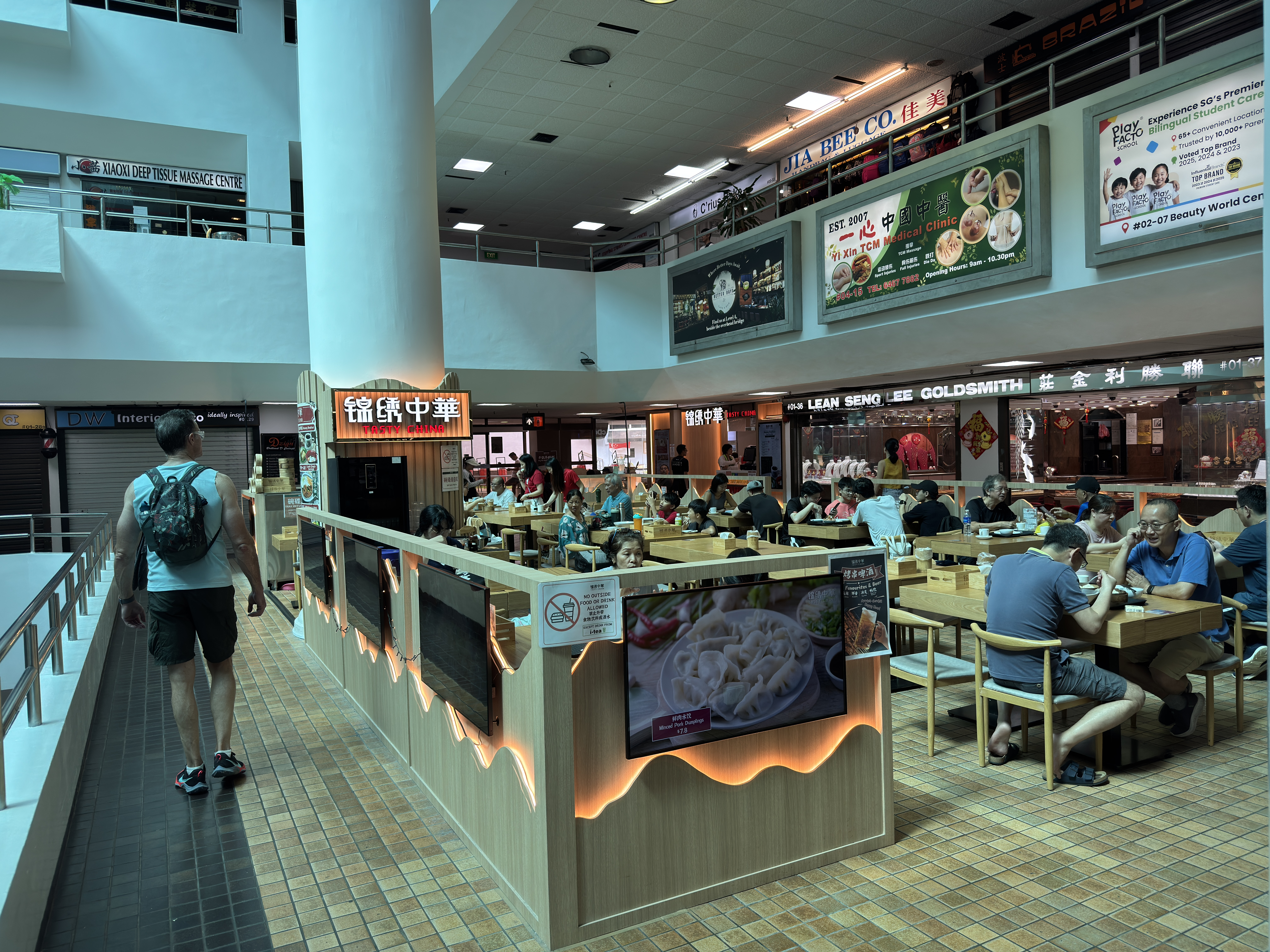
The interior of the mall in 2025.

By 2019, the mall was still "grappling with declining foot traffic". While the complex's eateries and food stalls continued to be patronised by office workers and the elderly, most of these customers did not actively support many of the other businesses in the mall. Desmond Ng and Poh Kok Ing of Channel NewsAsia reported then that many of the original shopkeepers, who had remained with the complex, were now elderly themselves and with children who did not wish to continue the family business, and who had either already shut down their businesses or were looking to do so soon and retire. However, Ng and Ing noted that while the complex was "stuck in a 1980s rut", it remained "clean and well-maintained" and that there were "even a couple of hipster cafes" which had opened in the mall. Tan Yingzhen of the Lianhe Zaobao instead reported in November 2020 that new shops were continuing to open at the mall, such as a dine-in bubble tea store, a Thai noodle restaurant and the "trendy" cafe September. She noted that there was then a Giant and a 7-eleven at the mall, in addition to the McDonald's, though the complex also had many cheap massage and beauty salons. Around 2021, a 'fundraising gang' began targeting the mall's patrons, harassing them for money in groups of four to five. This contributed to the mall's struggles with declining footfall.

By 2022, the mall was "cluttered with tuition centres and maid agencies." Ong Sor Fern of The Straits Times noted then that the "famed" hawker centre was popular with foodies. In April, a large vacant space on the retail podium's fourth floor rooftop was converted into a rooftop farm. The Rifle Range Nature Park opened nearby in October, leading to increased patronage for the Beauty World Food Centre, as well as for the mall in general, which was reportedly "packed with people" in the months that followed. However, it was reported in June that the 'fundraising gangs' were still active in the complex, and had become more active with the nature park's opening. In October 2023, the hawker centre underwent renovation works, which the tenants hoped would lead to more customers.

In February 2025, Time Out magazine called the complex "admittedly cobwebbed" and a "hodge-podge of reflexology spas, interior design firms, provision shops and, yup, a 24-hour McDonald's." The same month, Charmaine Jacobs of Channel NewsAsia reported that there had been numerous sightings of rats at the hawker centre, which was "dirty with rubbish often scattered on the floor, and food spills attracting rats, pigeons and cockroaches." This was in spite of several stallholders having made efforts to quell the issue through calling pest control regularly. The sightings resulted in "reduced" patronage at the hawker centre, though some regulars were reportedly "unfazed". The Singapore Food Agency and the National Environment Agency, which had conducted a joint investigation on the hawker centre, verified the rat sightings.
