= Beauty World Plaza =

Mixed-use building in Singapore

- Location: 140 Upper Bukit Timah Road, Bukit Timah, Singapore 588176
- Coordinates: 1.3420°N 103.7736°E
- Opened: 1982; 44 years ago
- Developer: Far East Organization

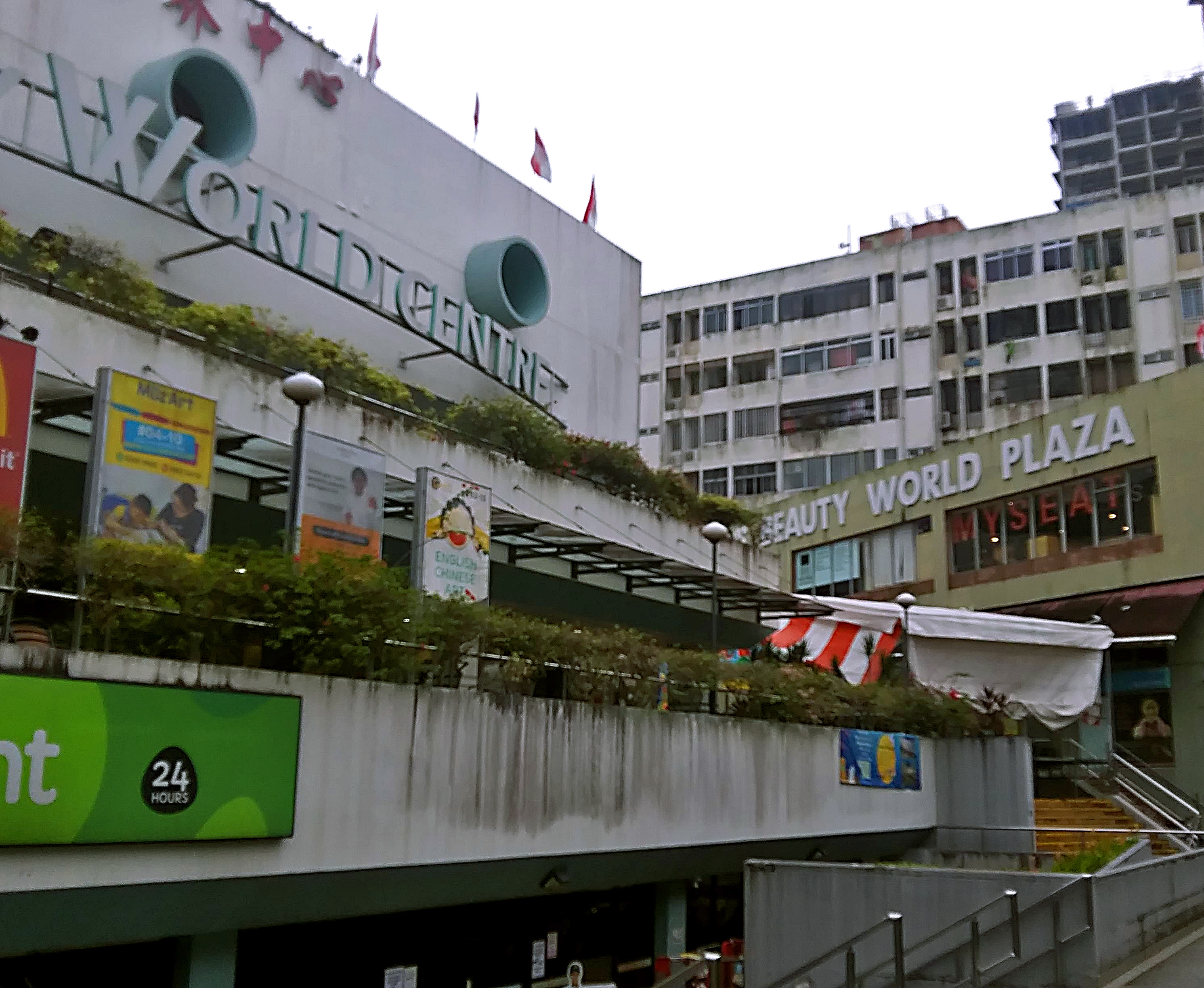
Beauty World Plaza (right) from Exit A of Beauty World MRT station in 2023.

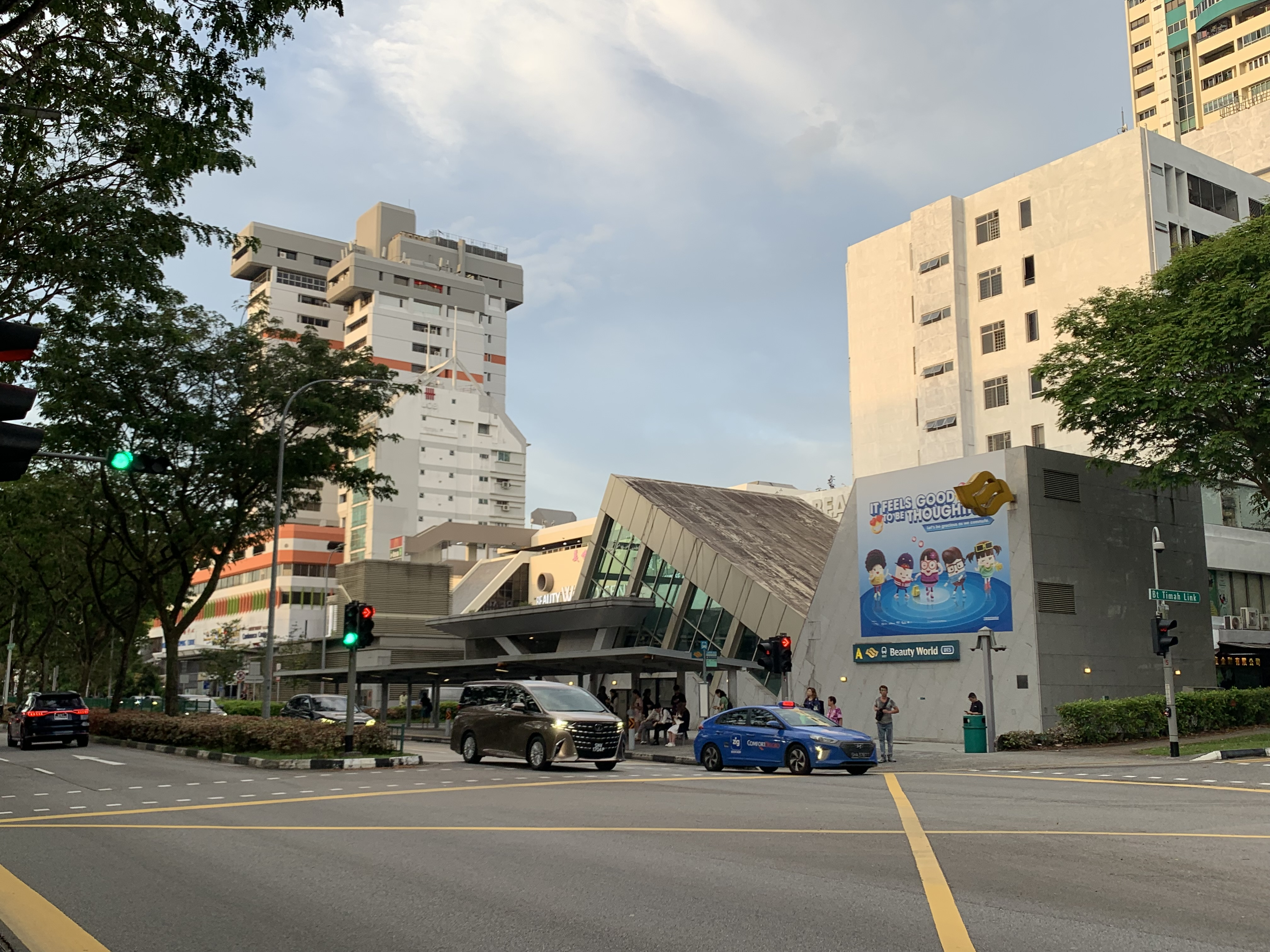
The complex's residential tower (right) behind Exit A of Beauty World MRT station in 2025.

Beauty World Plaza is a housing and shopping complex at the junction of Upper Bukit Timah Road and Bukit Timah Link in Bukit Timah, Singapore. Built in the 1980s, the mall had its heyday in the 1990s, though its popularity declined significantly after. In the late 2010s, there were two unsuccessful attempts to sell the complex.

== History ==
The housing and shopping complex was announced by the Far East Organization in 1980. Located next to the Beauty World Centre and near the Bukit Timah Shopping Centre, it was to comprise a residential tower resting on top of a three-storey retail podium. To make way for the complex, a "maze" of shophouses were demolished. The residential tower was initially planned to be eight-storeys-tall though it was eventually shortened to five storeys, leaving the complex as a whole eight-storeys-tall. The residential tower had 30 units.

By December, work on the podium had begun, while work on the residential tower was to begin after the podium was finished. The complex as a whole was then scheduled for completion toward the end of the following year, though the podium's units had already been put up for sale, with prices ranging from $170,000 to $1,000,000. The residential tower and retail podium were occupied by July and December 1983 respectively. Designed to "avoid congestion of incoming shoppers", the podium had 60 units and was air-conditioned, serviced by lifts, escalators and a public paging system. It was accompanied by a carpark with a capacity for 70 vehicles. In its early years, the complex could "hold its own" against Beauty World Centre and Bukit Timah Shopping Centre, which were "more commercially active". The mall had its heyday in the 1990s, particularly from 1993 to 1997, when it was a "thriving shopping hub". Despite the high rent in this period, many of its tenants bought multiple units.

However, shortly after its peak, the mall's popularity quickly began to wane. Elizabeth Gwee of The Straits Times wrote in September 2000 that there was "zero shopping to be done at Beauty World Plaza, unless you are in the market for a renovation contractor or want to have your eyebrows tattooed." By April 2002, the retail podium was reportedly "dead" outside of the lunch rush. Businesses such as maid agencies, dentists, clinics and beauty salons had begun to pop up at the complex, as well as in surrounding shopping centres such as Beauty World Centre and Bukit Timah Shopping Centre. This was partially attributed to the complex's age, as well as the rerouting of nearby bus routes. The URA announced that it planned to rejuvenate the area. The authority claimed that it sought to make the district, known as Anak Bukit, "the next mini-Orchard Road or Holland Village." However, it was announced in March 2004 that the URA had scrapped the plan.

By July 2006, the mall had become a "shadow of its former self", suffering from heavily declined footfall with many of its shops having shuttered, then being "mostly vacant". The low patronage was attributed in part to the mall's "deserted" appearance. Jane Chiapoco of today wrote that most of the people she saw entering the building were residents of the tower. Most of the tenants who had acquired multiple units sold off most of them. One draw of the building then was the rent, which had also declined significantly. Other tenants remained there only out of convenience or for the lack of competition. The "few" businesses on the ground floor then included a tailor, a movie rental store, a store selling Chinese handicrafts and a Hong Leong Finance branch. Only under 10 of the units were then owned by the Far East Organization. There were then rumours about a potential en-bloc sale for the complex, driven by the acquisition of several units by "a certain well-known developer" and the appointment of Knight Frank as the manager of the mall's management committee.

In December 2015, the Beauty World MRT station opened in front of Beauty World Centre and Beauty World Plaza. It was initially expected that the station would "breathe new life" into the mall, particularly due to one of the station's entrances being located directly in front of the mall. However, the construction work for the station further worsened the shopping centre's footfall as it obscured the complex from the road and the blasting from the construction site had caused patrons' "confidence in the building's structure" to be "rocked". In November 2018, the complex was put up for sale with a reserve price of $165 million. At the same time, an application was submitted to the URA to change the site's part "residential" zoning to serviced apartments. The application was accepted, though the tender was unsuccessful. The complex was again put up for sale for $165 million.
