= Beauty World MRT station =

Mass Rapid Transit station in Singapore

Beauty World DT5 美世界 பியூட்டி வோர்ல்ட்
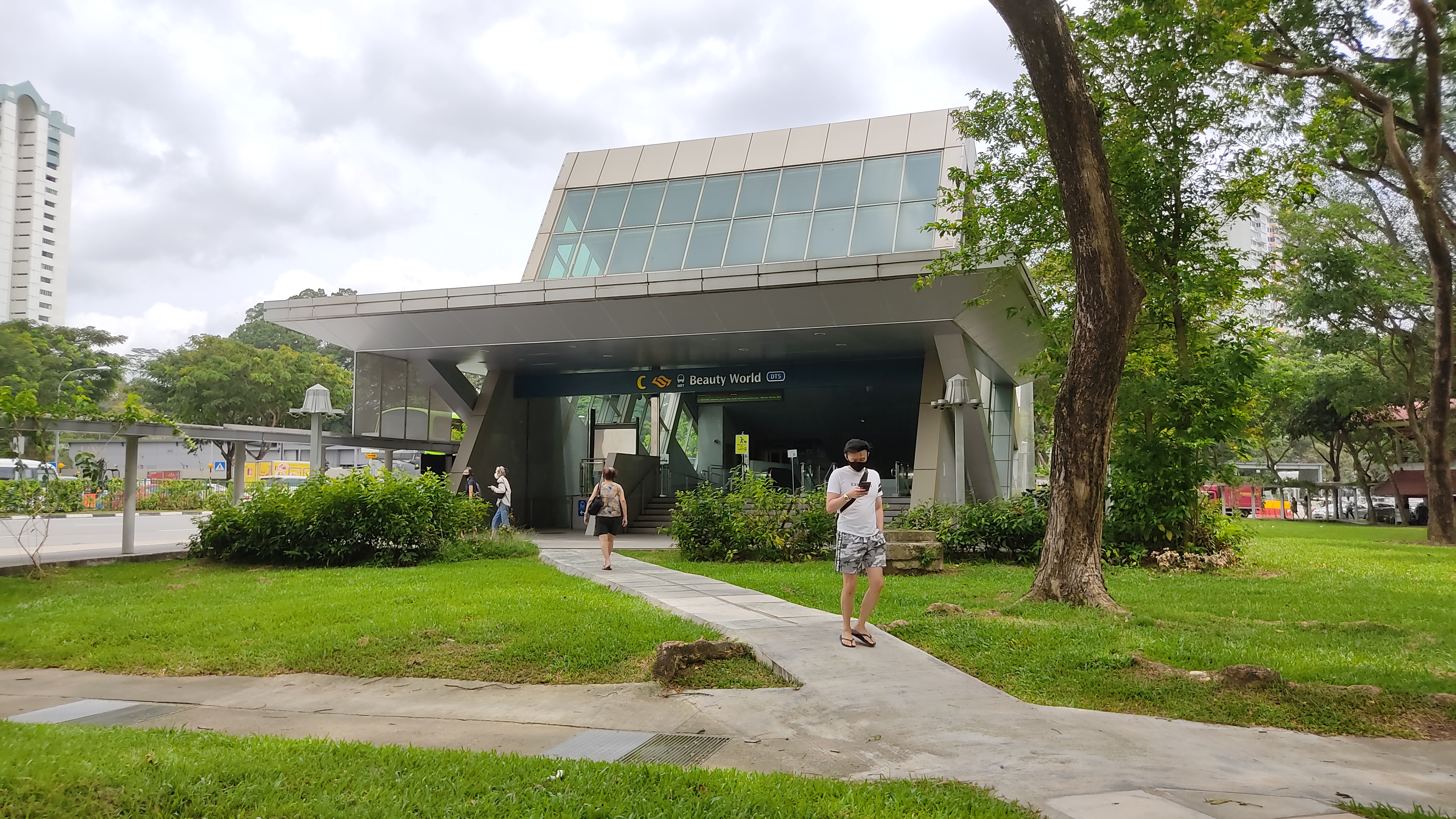
- Exit C of Beauty World station

General information
- Location: 101 Upper Bukit Timah Road, Singapore 588216
- Coordinates: 01°20′28″N 103°46′33″E
- System: Mass Rapid Transit (MRT) station
- Owner: Land Transport Authority
- Operator: SBS Transit
- Line: Downtown Line
- Platforms: 2 (1 island platform)
- Tracks: 2
- Connections: Bus, Taxi

Construction
- Structure type: Underground
- Platform levels: 1
- Accessible: Yes

Other information
- Station code: BTW

History
- Opened: 27 December 2015; 10 years ago
- Former names: Anak Bukit, Seventh Mile

Passengers
- June 2024: 13,081 per day

Services
Preceding station	Mass Rapid Transit	Following station
Hume towards Bukit Panjang	Downtown Line	King Albert Park towards Expo
Track layout
Location
- Location within Singapore Rail

Beauty World MRT station is an underground Mass Rapid Transit (MRT) station on the Downtown Line (DTL) in Bukit Timah, Singapore. Located along Upper Bukit Timah Road, this station took its name from the historic Beauty World Market, a former amusement park and market that once stood in the vicinity. Beauty World station primarily serves the residential estates along Jalan Jurong Kechil and Toh Yi Drive, as well as Beauty World Centre, Beauty World Plaza, and Bukit Timah Shopping Centre. It is also within walking distances to Ngee Ann Polytechnic, Pei Hwa Presbyterian Primary School, Bukit Timah Market & Food Centre, Bukit Timah Community Club, Bukit Timah Tua Pek Kong Temple, and Bee Low See Temple.

Until 2025, the section of tracks between this station and Hillview MRT station was the longest between any two MRT stations on the Downtown Line. There used to be basic structural provisions for a future station (also known as a "box station") along this section of tracks near Hume Avenue. Hume MRT station was confirmed on 7 March 2019 and was opened for public commuters on 28 February 2025.

== History ==
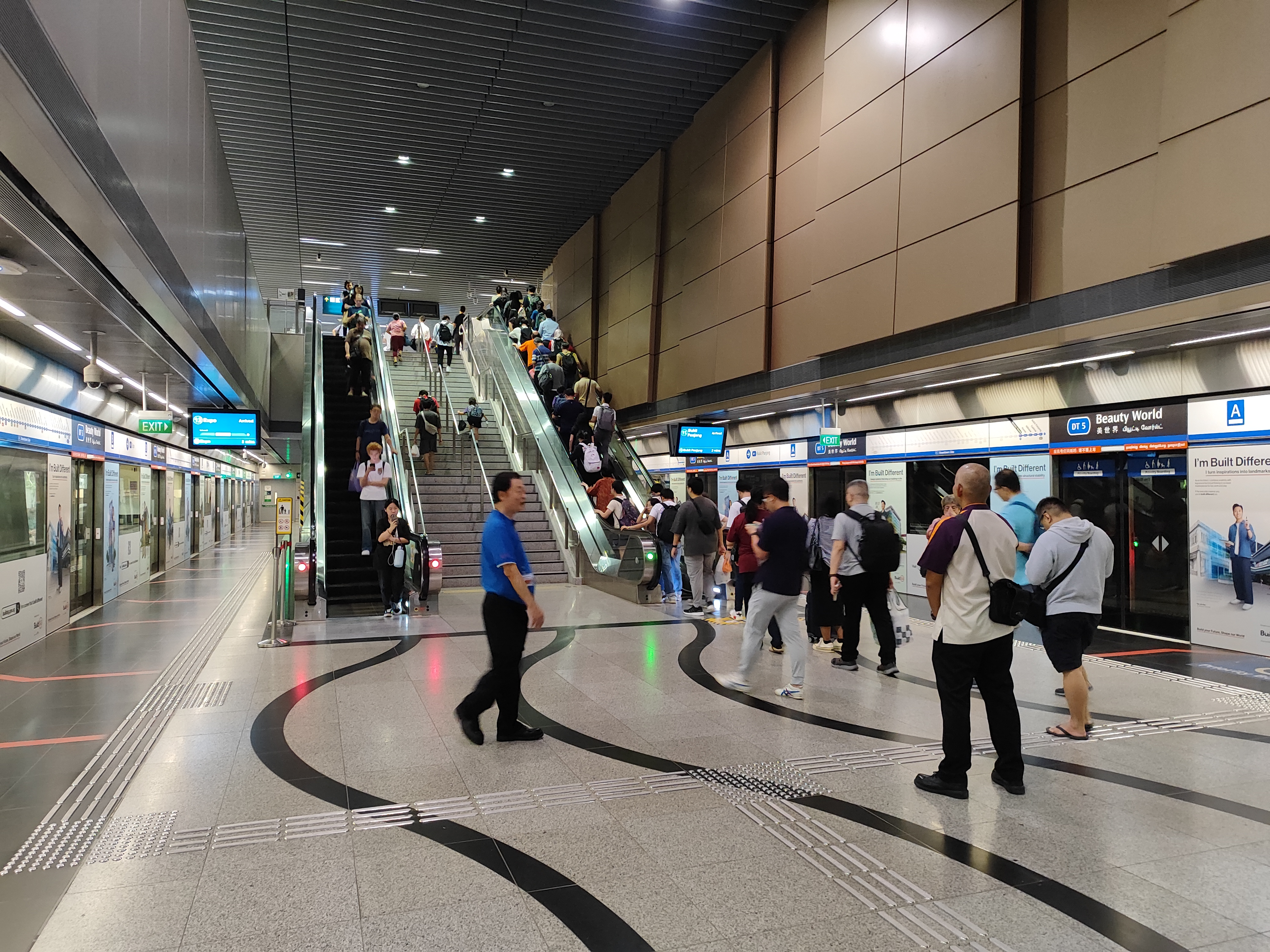
Platform level of the station

The station was first announced in July 2008 when the stations on stage two of the DTL (DTL2) were announced. Contract 916 for the design and construction of Beauty World station and associated tunnels was awarded to McConnell Dowell S.E.A. Pte Ltd on 25 March 2009 at a contract sum of S$339.88 million (US$233.67 million).

Tunnelling works began on 8 June 2011. Two tunnel boring machines — which were named Athena and Artemis, after the Greek goddesses by students of the nearby Pei Hwa Presbyterian Primary School — tunnelled the 1 kilometre (0.62 miles) stretch from Beauty World to King Albert Park.

During construction, nearby restaurant owners were upset over the hoardings and noise barriers set up. This prompted the Land Transport Authority (LTA) to banners and signs that helped with navigation around diversions, directing them to places of interest such as these restaurants. Then-Principal Engineering Officer of the DTL2, Teo Meng Sai, helped removed any potential hazards around the site of the station and provided earplugs to residents in the nearby condominium.

== Station details ==
Beauty World Station is located between Hume and King Albert Park stations on the Downtown Line. The official station code is DT5. Being part of the Downtown Line, Beauty World station is operated by SBS Transit. Beauty World Station is also a designated Civil Defence (CD) shelter.

=== Etymology ===
The original name for "Beauty World" referred to an amusement park in the area. At that time, amusement parks were called "worlds": the others included Gay World, Great World (which Great World City now occupies), and New World. The amusement park was subsequently converted to a market after the end of World War II, and called Beauty World Market. However, fire hazards led to the subsequent demolition of the park in the 1980s.

The station was also named after the Beauty World Centre. Other names such as Anak Bukit and Seventh Mile were considered before the name Beauty World was selected.

=== Art-in-Transit ===
"Asemic Lines" by Boedi Widjaja is an artwork that presents the multi-cultural mix of language and invites viewers' aesthetic intuition to 'hover' between reading and looking.
