= Singapore Korean International School =

- 싱가포르한국국제학교

Location
- 71 Bukit Tinggi Road; Singapore 289759; Singapore
- Coordinates: 1.345654°N 103.79054730000007°E

Information
- Type: Korean international school
- Established: March 1993; 33 years ago
- Website: https://skis.kr/default/

Singapore Korean International School (SKIS, Korean: 싱가포르한국국제학교) is a South Korean international school in Bukit Timah, Singapore. Founded in March 1993, It covers kindergarten through senior high school. The first students graduated in February 1995 and the school held a relocation ceremony in November 2010.

As of 2018, it had 450 students at the pre-school, primary, middle and high school levels.
