= Golden Landmark Shopping Complex =

Coordinates: 1.3019452°N 103.8573643°E

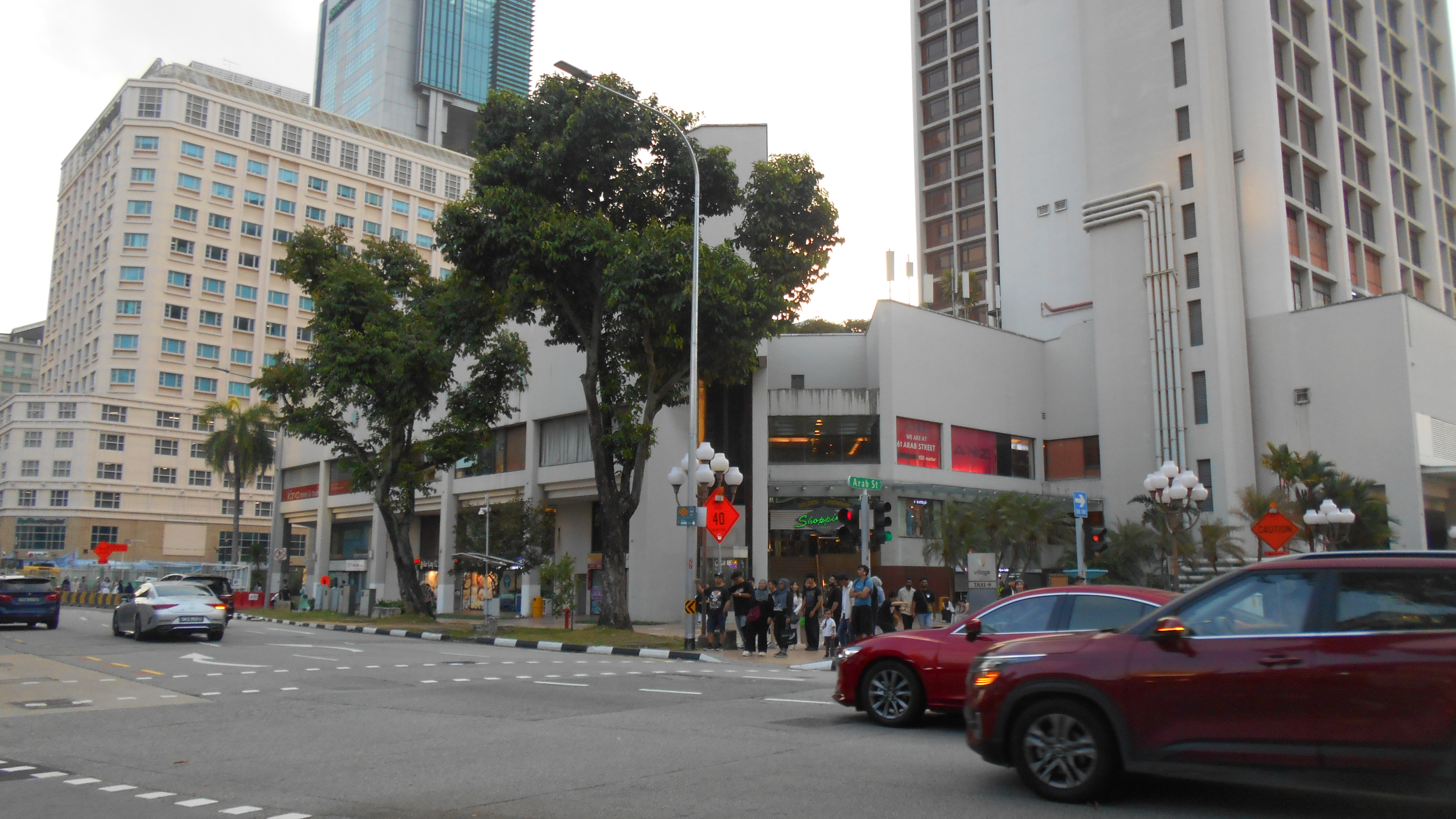
- The Golden Landmark Shopping Complex in 2024.
- Interactive map of the Golden Landmark Shopping Complex area

General information
- Status: Active
- Type: Commercial
- Architectural style: Modern
- Location: 390 Victoria Street, Singapore 188061
- Coordinates: 1.3019452, 103.8573643
- Completed: 1983; 43 years ago
- Owner: Far East Organization

Other information
- Facilities: Village Hotel Bugis

The Golden Landmark Shopping Complex is a commercial building located along Victoria Street in the Kampong Glam district of Rochor, Singapore. It is one of Singapore's "older generation" shopping centres.

== History ==
Originally, a complex of terraced shophouses as well as a Muslim burial ground were originally located at the space between North Bridge Road and Victoria Street. The burial ground was centred around the keramat of a Muslim scholar named Fakeh Haji Abdul Jalil, who was the first Imam of the nearby Sultan Mosque. The shophouses were demolished and the burial ground was cleared in the 1980s to make way for the construction of a new shopping centre. The shopping centre was eventually given the name Golden Landmark and was completed in 1983. A hotel was then planned to be built within the new shopping centre, but its construction was delayed due to financial issues and certain unspecified unforeseen circumstances. This hotel was completed in 1988 and named Village Hotel Bugis in reference to its location, which was adjacent to the nearby Bugis Street.

== Significance ==
The Golden Landmark Shopping Complex is well known for being a hub of traditional Malay fashion, with classic Malay clothes such as baju kurung being sold there. It is also home to Islamic bookstores. A musollah (prayer room) can also be found in the second level of the shopping mall. The shopping mall is also a popular destination for younger generation shoppers, who prefer to check out the many thrift stores and designer fashion stores within the mall. Bridal stores are also a common sight within the mall, with most of such stores having a Malay or Muslim wedding theme. The mall is also known for having hair salons and a wide range of jewellery.

== Transportation ==
The Golden Landmark Shopping Complex has a bus stop directly outside it. The Bugis MRT station on both the Downtown and East–West MRT lines is also within walking distance.

== See also ==
- Golden Mile Complex
