= Bukit Batok (disambiguation) =

Bukit Batok may refer to:

- Bukit Batok, Planning area and matured residential town in West Region of Singapore.
  - Bukit Batok Central, subzone of Bukit Batok.
- Bukit Batok Bus Interchange, interchange bus station located at Block 631 Bukit Batok Central, Singapore.
- Bukit Batok Library, library in Bukit Batok, Singapore.
- Bukit Batok Memorial, on top of the tranquil Bukit Batok Hill.
- Bukit Batok MRT station, MRT station in Singapore.
- Bukit Batok Nature Park, urban park in Bukit Batok, Singapore
- Bukit Batok Secondary School, co-educational government secondary school in Bukit Batok, Singapore.
- Bukit Batok Single Member Constituency, single member constituency in Bukit Batok of Singapore.
- Bukit Batok Town Park, nature park in Bukit Batok, Singapore.
- Bukit Batok West MRT station, future elevated Mass Rapid Transit (MRT) station on the Jurong Region Line.
