= Bukit Batok Library =

Public library in Singapore

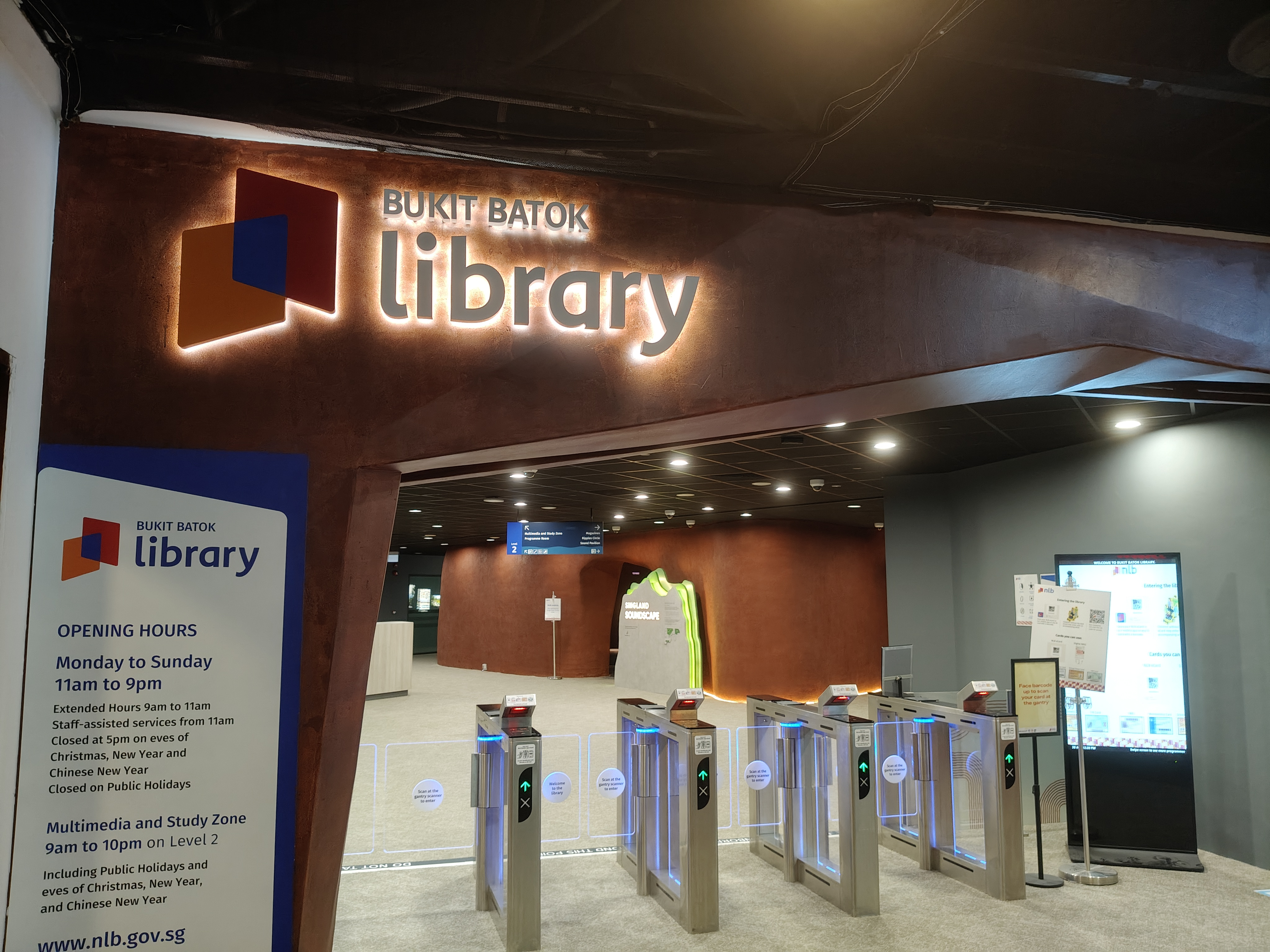
- Bukit Batok Library in 2026
- 1.349847°N 103.749239°E
- Location: 1 Bukit Batok Central Link, #03-01, West Mall, Singapore 658713, Singapore
- Type: Public library
- Established: 21 November 1998; 27 years ago
- Branch of: National Library Board

Collection
- Size: 150,000

Other information
- Public transit access: NS2 Bukit Batok, Bukit Batok Bus Interchange
- Website: National Library Board

Bukit Batok Library is located in Bukit Batok, Singapore, occupying three floors in the West Mall shopping mall. It was the fifth library of the National Library Board to be located inside a shopping mall. The library was officially opened on 21 November 1998 by Deputy Prime Minister, BG (NS) Lee Hsien Loong.

== History ==
The library began operating as Bukit Batok Community Library soon after West Mall was opened in 1998. It was the first library in the world to implement the Radio Frequency Identification (RFID) Electronic Library Management System (ELiMS).

In 2008, the library was renamed to Bukit Batok Public Library.

In 2011, the library underwent its first renovation. The customer service counter was relocated closer to the entrance, with the former counter area converted into a digital services zone. The newspaper reading area was also expanded, alongside other refurbishment works such as recarpeting, repainting, and lighting improvements.

In December 2023, the library underwent a major renovation and reopened in March 2026. The library was doubled in size. Additional features such as soundscape installations and exhibitions about Bukit Batok's history were introduced, together with new digital services to enhance visitor experience. It was the first library in Singapore to incorporate sound as part of the visitor experience.

== Facilities ==
Bukit Batok Library occupies a total floor area of 2,700 square metres (29,000 sq ft), spanning three floors within West Mall. Its design draws inspiration from the nearby Little Guilin in Bukit Batok Town Park.

The library is wheelchair accessible and includes a customer service counter, an adults’, teens’ and children's section, a storytelling/activity area, a multimedia/study zone, a programme room and exhibition spaces.

The library also serves as a pilot site for new NLB's new digital initiatives, Scan-n-Discover and Infinite Shelves.

=== Singland Soundscape ===
Located on Levels 1 and 2 of the library, the Singland Soundscape was developed in collaboration with Singapore Land Group, featuring soundtracks incorporating field recordings captured around Bukit Batok by local sound artist Mervin Wong. Featuring four key spaces, namely the Sound Cave, Time Caverns, Sound Library and Sound Pavilion, the space aims to engage the senses and inspire mindfulness among visitors.

== See also ==
- Bukit Batok
- List of libraries in Singapore
