= Bukit Batok =

- Planning Area and HDB Town

Other transcription(s)
  - Malay: Bukit Batok (Rumi) بوکيت باتوق (Jawi)
  - Chinese: 武吉巴督; Wǔjí Bādū (Pinyin); Bú-kit Pa-tok (Hokkien POJ)
  - Tamil: புக்கிட் பாத்தோக் Pukkiṭ Pāttōk (Transliteration)
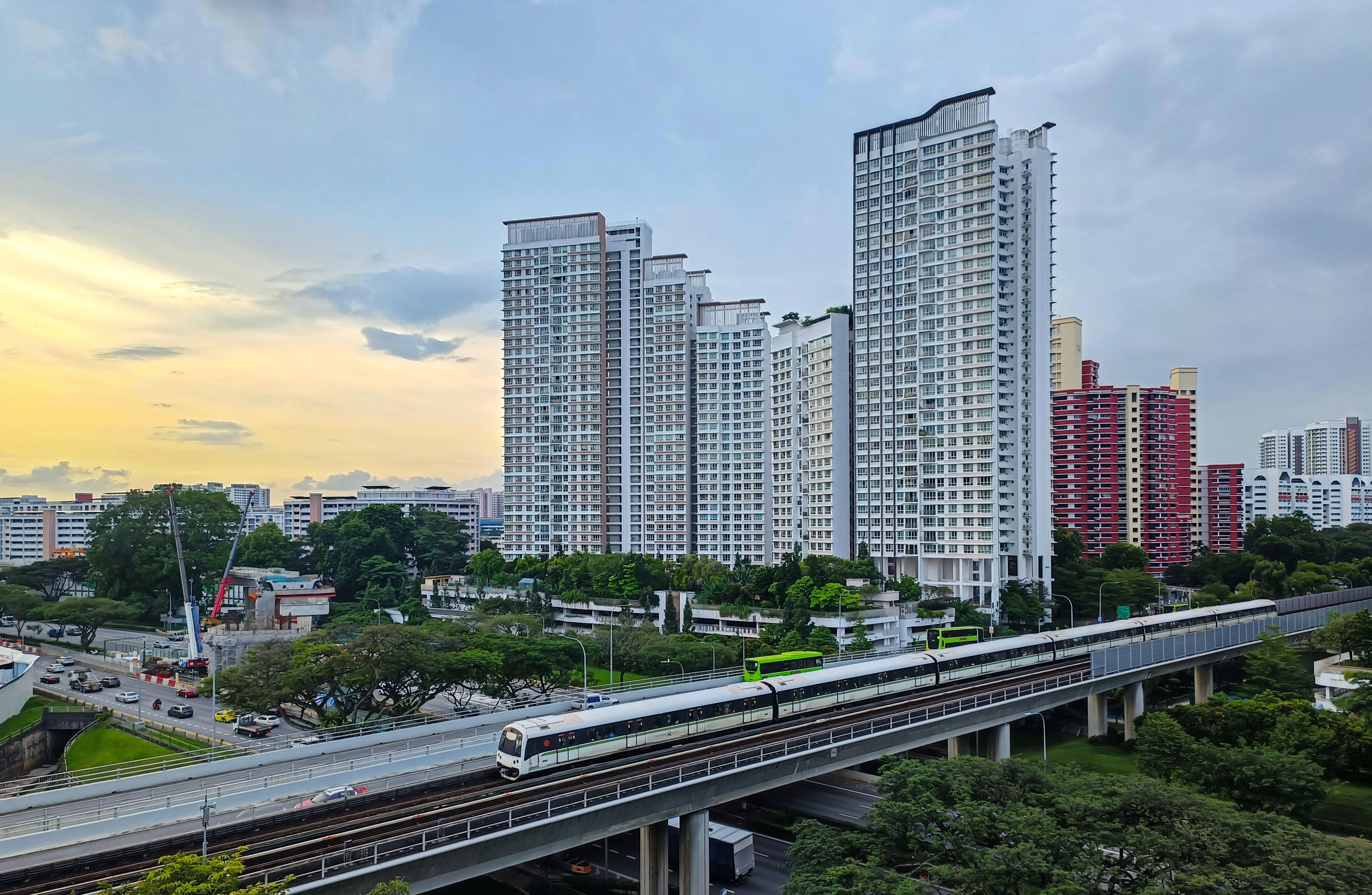
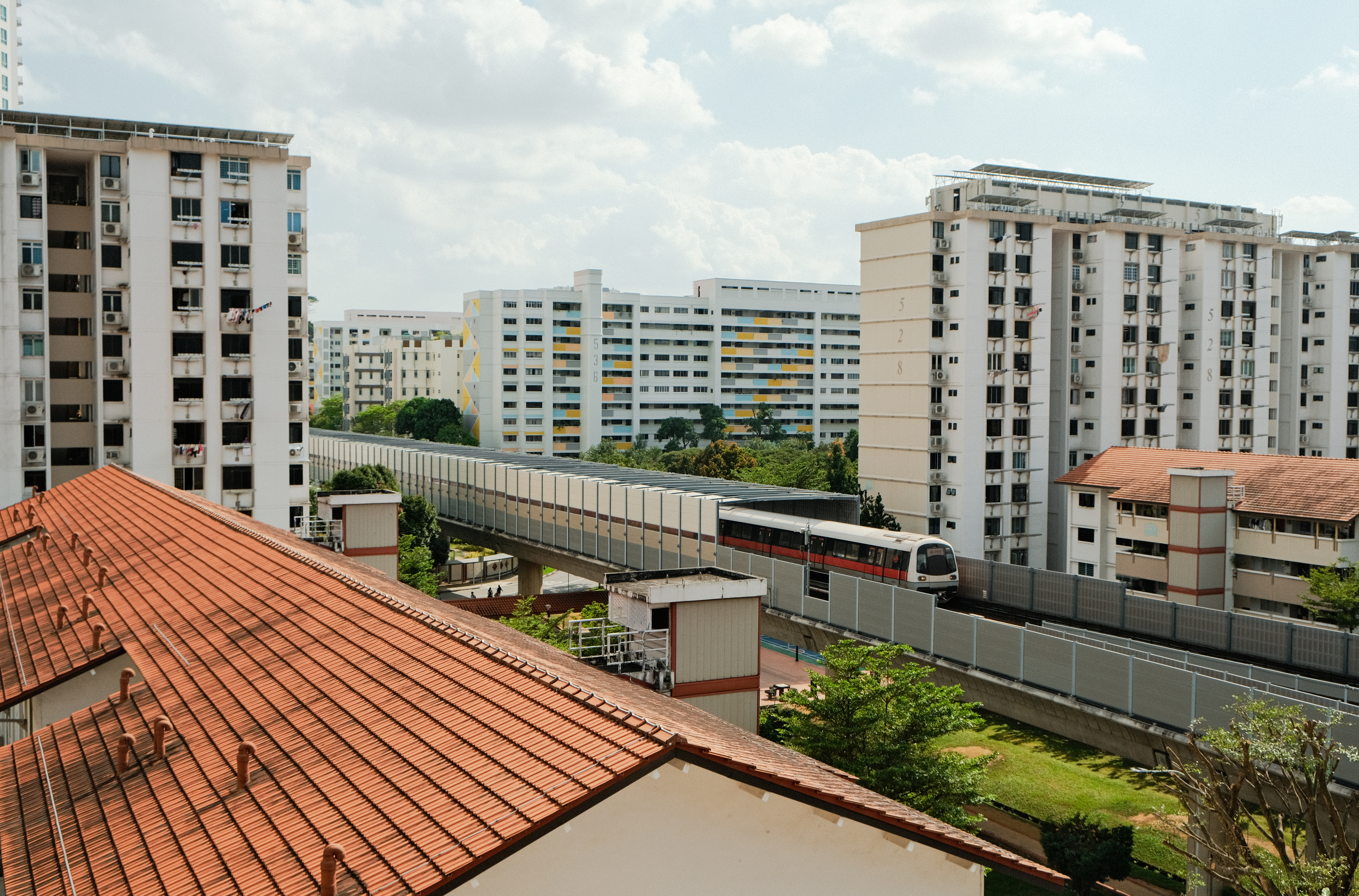
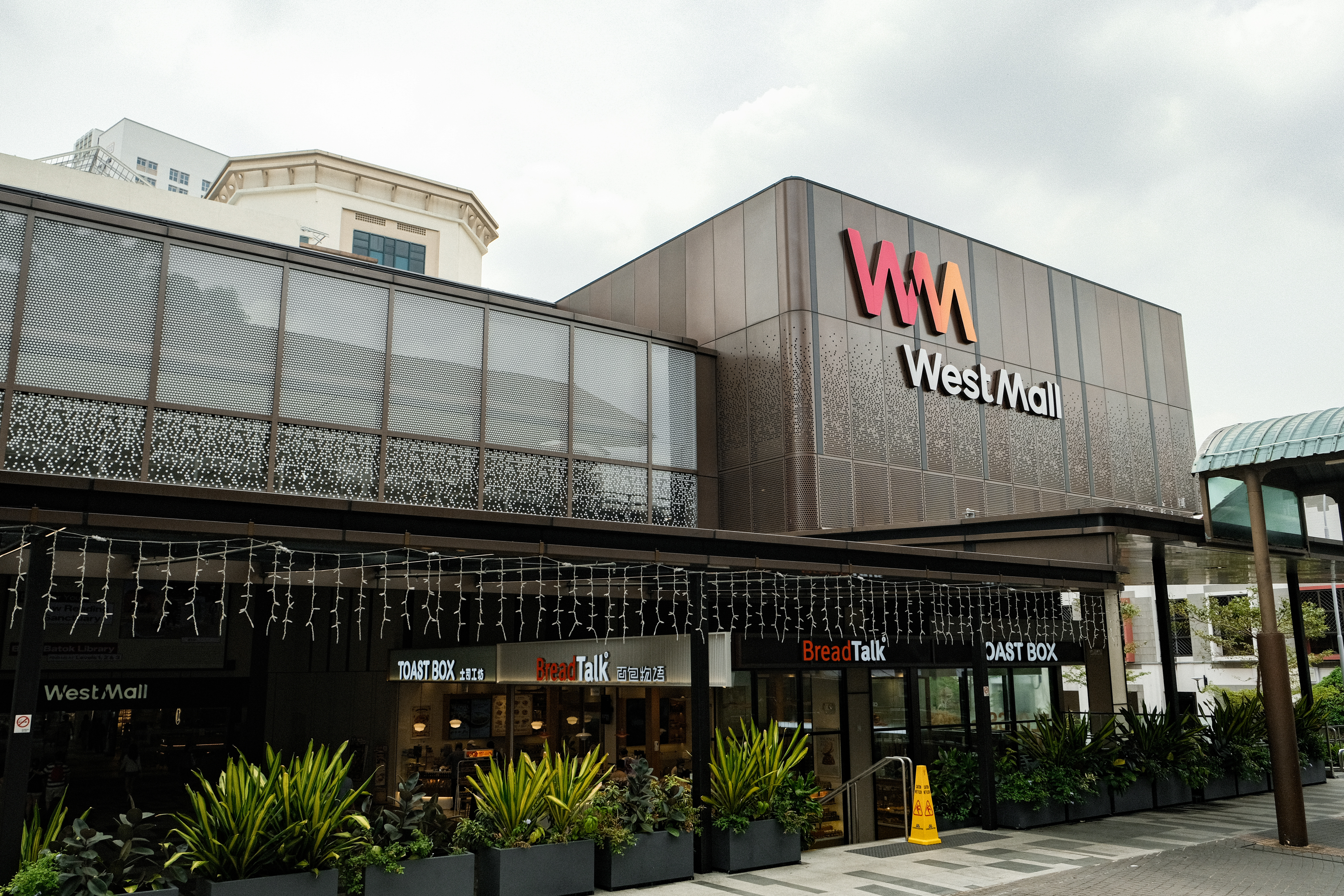
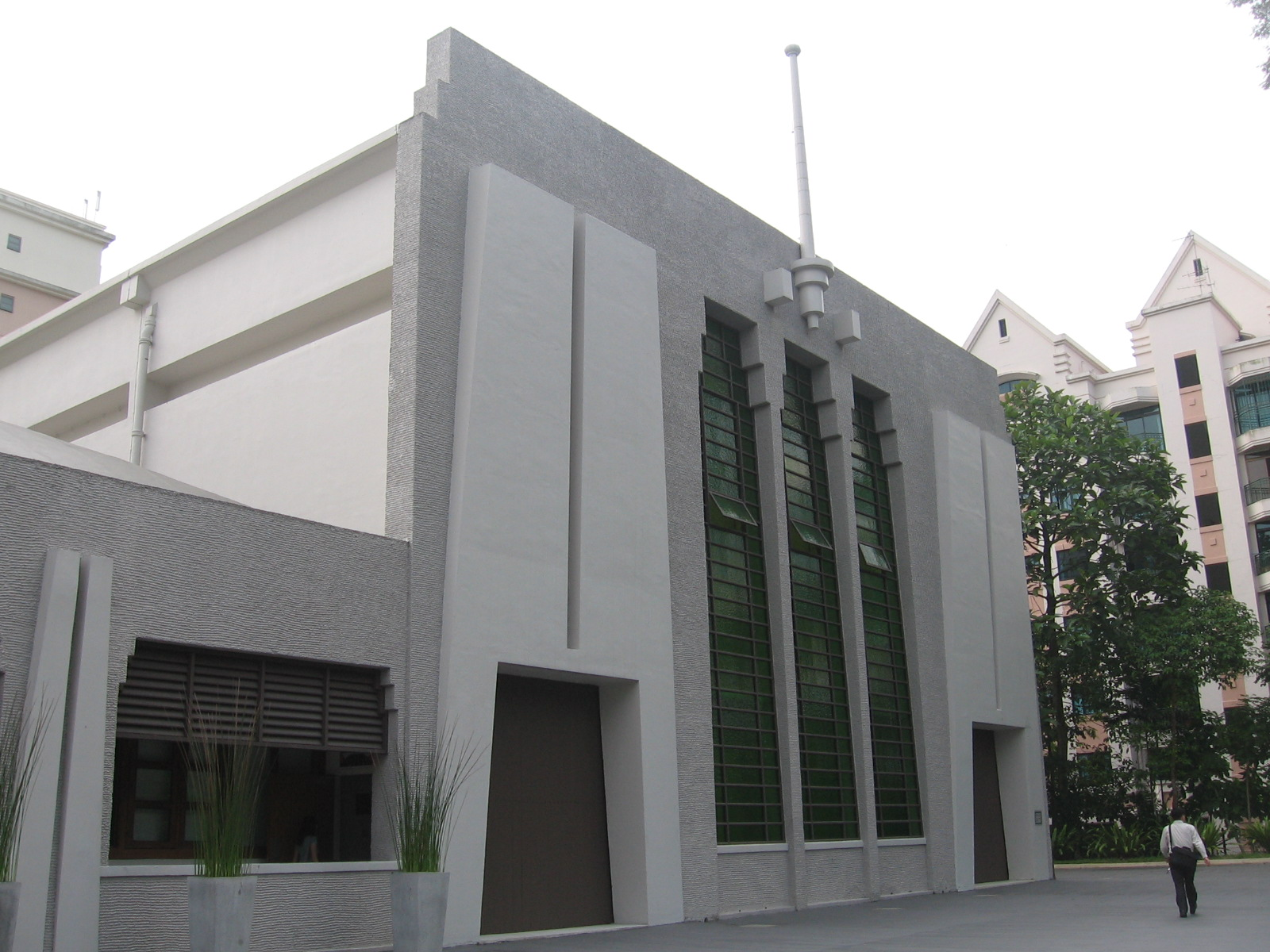
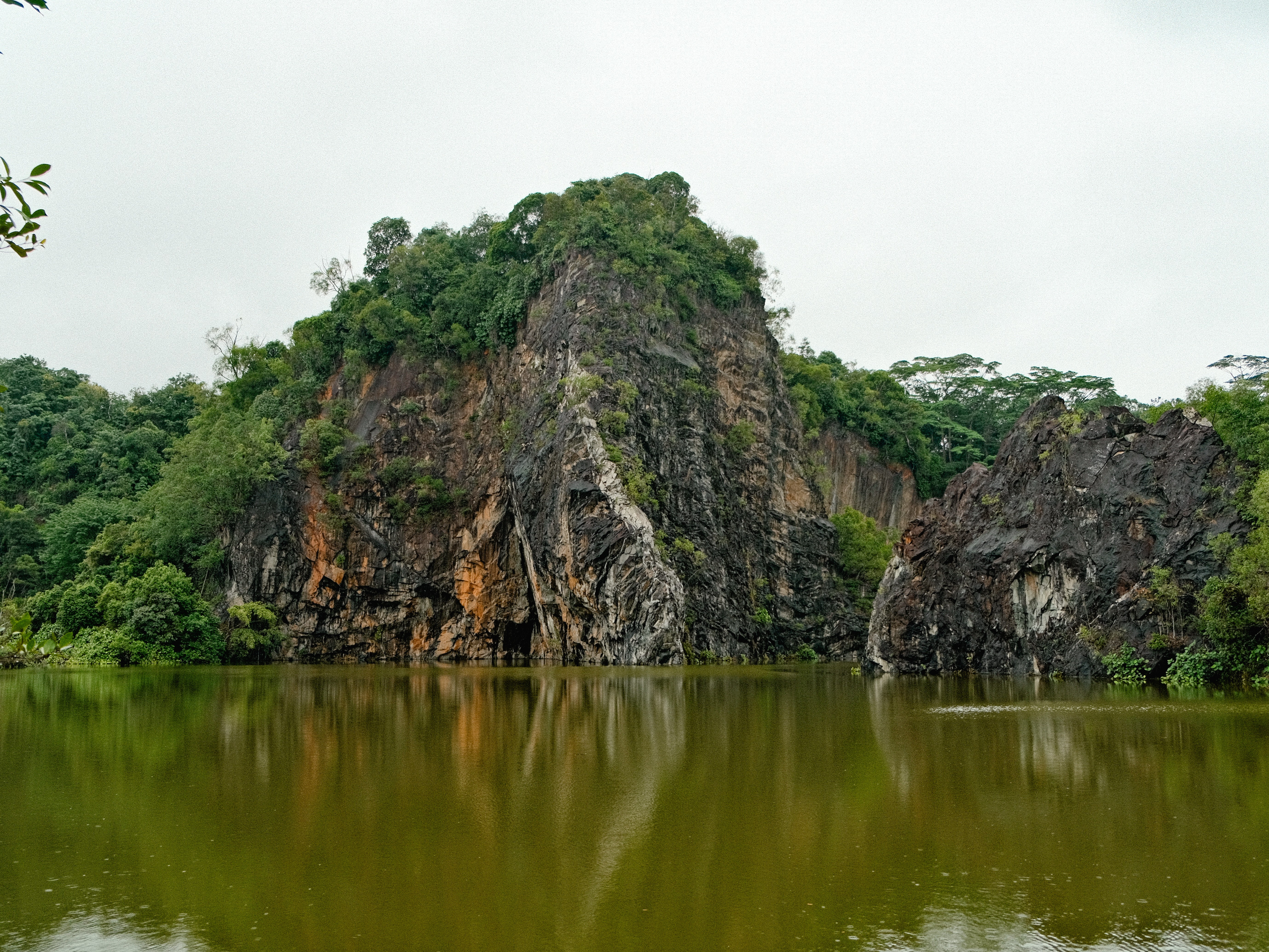
- From top left to right: Aerial view of Bukit Batok West, aerial view of Bukit Gombak, West Mall, Old Ford Motor Factory, Bukit Batok Town Park

- Location of Bukit Batok in Singapore

- Location of Bukit Batok within Singapore
- Coordinates: 1°21′32.51″N 103°45′49.25″E
- Country: Singapore
- Region: West Region
- CDC: South West CDC
- Town councils: Chua Chu Kang Town Council; Jurong-Clementi Town Council
- Constituencies: Bukit Gombak SMC; Chua Chu Kang GRC; Jurong East–Bukit Batok GRC
- Town announced: 21 November 1975
- DGP exhibited: 1996
- PA incorporated: 22 January 1999

Government
  - Mayor: South West CDC: Low Yen Ling
  - Members of Parliament: Bukit Gombak SMC: Low Yen Ling; Chua Chu Kang GRC: Tan See Leng; Jurong East–Bukit Batok GRC: Lee Hong Chuang; Murali Pillai; Rahayu Mahzam

Area
  - Total: 11.14 km^{2} (4.30 sq mi)
  - Rank: 25th
  - Residential: 2.91 km^{2} (1.12 sq mi)
- Elevation: 52 m (170 ft)

Population (2026)
  - Total: 165,680
  - Rank: 10th
  - Density: 14,870/km^{2} (38,520/sq mi)
  - Rank: 9th

Ethnic groups (2020)
  - Chinese: 113,460
  - Malays: 25,240
  - Indians: 14,950
  - Others: 4,380
- Postal districts: 21, 23
- Postal sectors: 58, 59, 65, 66, 67
- Dwelling units: 32,275
- Projected ultimate: 53,000

Bukit Batok
- Simplified Chinese: 武吉巴督
Transcriptions
Standard Mandarin
- Hanyu Pinyin: Wǔjí Bādū
- IPA: [ù.tɕǐ.pá.tú]

Bukit Batok (IPA: /ˈbʊkɪtbəˈtɒk/ BUU-kit-buh-TOK) is a planning area and new town in the West Region of Singapore. It is bordered by Choa Chu Kang to the north, Clementi to the south, Bukit Panjang and Bukit Timah to the east, and Tengah and Jurong East to the west.

Bukit Batok developed from a former quarrying area into a residential town. The planning area is largely underlain by Gombak norite, an igneous rock formation that supported commercial quarrying in the area during the mid-20th century.

Bukit Batok is among the more densely populated planning areas in Singapore. It comprises public and private residential estates, neighbourhood centres, schools, parks and transport links serving residents in the western part of the country.

== Etymology ==
The name Bukit Batok combines bukit, the Malay word for "hill", with batok, a term subject to several competing linguistic and historical interpretations.

According to research on local toponyms by Savage and Yeoh, one theory suggests a botanical origin recorded by a Javanese village chief in Kampung Gassing, who noted that the area was covered in coconut palms; in Javanese, batok refers to a coconut shell, suggesting the name meant "Coconut Hill".

Another perspective links the name to phonetic shifts or folk etymology among non-Malay settlers. Accounts documented by the National Library Board note that Chinese migrants used the Malay word for stone, batu, to describe the area's granite formations, which gradually morphed from batu to bato and finally batok. Community accounts also suggest early residents likened the rounded shape of the local hills to a human skull top, using an expression phonetically similar to batok.

A third explanation connects the name to the Malay word for cough, batuk (often rendered as batok). Scholars and historians attribute this link either to the loud, echoing dynamite blasts at mid-20th-century granite quarries like Poh Hin Quarry and present-day Little Guilin, or to the area's cool, damp climate that caused early inhabitants to frequently suffer from respiratory illnesses.

== History ==
Before the 1940s, Bukit Batok was largely a rural, agricultural area characterized by rolling hills, rubber plantations, and pineapple estates, with minimal industrialization taking place. As early manufacturing activity began moving westward, prominent industrial developments were established, most notably the Ford Motor Factory, which opened in 1941 as Ford's first motor vehicle assembly plant in Southeast Asia.

=== World War II and the Japanese Occupation ===
During World War II, Bukit Batok and its high ground held tactical significance during the Battle of Singapore in February 1942. Following the defense failure by British Commonwealth forces during the Battle of Bukit Timah, British forces surrendered unconditionally to the Imperial Japanese Army on 15 February 1942 at the Ford Motor Factory, an event Winston Churchill termed the "largest capitulation" in British military history. During the occupation, Japanese forces utilized Allied prisoners of war (POWs) to construct a Shinto shrine called Syonan Chureito atop Bukit Batok Hill, alongside a smaller wooden memorial dedicated to fallen Allied soldiers built directly behind it.

=== Post-War quarrying ===
Following the war, the area experienced extensive industrial quarrying of Gombak norite, an igneous rock formation unique to the region, at prominent mining sites including Poh Kim Quarry.

=== Urban development into a new town ===
In late 1975, government plans were announced to redevelop the rural plantation and quarry terrain into a self-contained satellite town, which was rapidly urbanized by the Housing and Development Board (HDB) throughout the late 1970s and 1980s while preserving geological features like Little Guilin.

== Geography ==
=== Location ===
Bukit Batok is situated within the eastern enclave of the West Region of Singapore, occupying a total land area of approximately 11.14 km^{2} (4.30 sq mi). It shares administrative and geographic boundaries with six adjacent planning areas: Choa Chu Kang to the north and north-west, Bukit Panjang to the north-east and east, Clementi to the south, Bukit Timah to the south-east, Jurong East to the south-west, and Tengah to the west.

=== Geology and topography ===
The geological profile of Bukit Batok is predominantly defined by Gombak norite, a dense, coarse-grained plutonic igneous rock formation that extends into the neighbouring Cashew area. Due to the high concentration of this durable material, the region served as a major centre for commercial granite quarrying throughout the mid-20th century. Following the cessation of extractive operations, several disused quarry sites were ecologically integrated into the urban landscape as protected public amenities, most notably the prominent granite cliff face at Bukit Batok Town Park (popularly known as Little Guilin).

=== Subzones ===
For urban planning, demographic tracking, and statistical assessment, the Urban Redevelopment Authority (URA) delineates Bukit Batok into nine distinct subzones.

Estate	Location	Notable places	Accessibility
Brickworks	Areas bounded by Bukit Batok Road, Bukit Batok West Avenue 2 and Bukit Batok West Avenue 3	Millennia Institute, Dulwich College Singapore and Bukit Batok Hillside Park	Buses and Tengah Park MRT station (future)
Bukit Batok Central	Areas bounded by Bukit Batok West Avenue 6, Bukit Batok West Avenue 3, Bukit Batok Central, Bukit Batok East Avenue 3 and Bukit Batok East Avenue 6	Bukit Batok MRT station, Bukit Batok Bus Interchange, Bukit Batok Community Club, Bukit Batok Library, West Mall, Bukit Batok Polyclinic, Bukit View Secondary School, Keming Primary School, Ling Hong Tong and Bukit Batok Joint Temple	Bukit Batok MRT station and buses
Bukit Batok East	Areas bounded by Bukit Batok East Avenue 2, Bukit Batok East Avenue 3, Bukit Batok East Avenue 4, Bukit Batok East Avenue 5 and Bukit Batok East Avenue 6	Bukit Batok East Community Club and Bukit Batok Neighbourhood Police Centre, Hock Thong Temple, See Thian Foh Temple and Masjid Ar-Raudhah Mosque	Buses
Bukit Batok South	Areas bounded by Bukit Batok East Avenue 1, 3 and 6; the Pan-Island Expressway, Toh Tuck Road and the western side of the landed houses along Jalan Jurong Kechil	Bukit Batok Swimming Complex and Bukit Batok Bus Depot	Buses
Bukit Batok West	Areas bounded by Bukit Batok Road, Bukit Batok West Avenue 3, Bukit Batok West Avenue 6, Bukit Batok Avenue 1 and the Pan-Island Expressway.	Bukit Batok Secondary School, Princess Elizabeth Primary School, Guilin Combined Temple, Sattha Puchaniyaram Buddhist Temple and Bukit Batok Providence Presbyterian Church	Buses and Bukit Batok West MRT station (future)
Gombak	Northern Bukit Batok	Bukit Panjang MRT station, Cashew MRT station and Bukit Gombak Community Centre	Bukit Panjang MRT station, Cashew MRT station and buses
Guilin	Areas to the immediate north of Bukit Batok Central	Bukit Gombak MRT station, Bukit Batok Town Park, Bukit Gombak Stadium, Hillgrove Secondary School and Lianhua Primary School	Bukit Gombak MRT station and buses
Hillview	Eastern Bukit Batok	Hillview MRT station, Old Ford Motor Factory and Bukit Batok Nature Park	Hillview MRT station, Hume MRT station and buses
Hong Kah North	Areas bounded by Bukit Batok Road, Bukit Batok West Avenue 2 and Bukit Batok West Avenue 5	Bukit Batok Driving Centre, Hong Kah North Community Club, Swiss Cottage Secondary School, Dunearn Secondary School, Saint Anthony's Primary School, Zu-Lin Temple and Dazhong Primary School	Bukit Gombak MRT station and buses

== Demographics ==
=== Introduction and overall population growth ===
Bukit Batok’s demographic profile reflects rapid suburban expansion and densification driven by public housing development. Between 2000 and 2026, the resident population grew from 126,640 to 165,680, peaking at 165,830 in 2025. This rapid population growth highlights the impact of urban planning policies in decentralising Singapore's population toward the West Region. Within the planning area, subzones like Brickworks exhibit the highest population density, housing 31,900 residents.

Resident population history
Year	Pop.	±% p.a.
2000	126,640	—
2005	135,420	+1.35%
2010	144,200	+1.26%
2015	139,270	−0.69%
2020	158,030	+2.56%
2025	165,830	+0.97%
2026	165,680	−0.09%

=== Age structure and socio-economic implications ===
Population pyramid of Bukit Batok in 2026

The age composition of Bukit Batok reveals an aging population structure:

- Dependants (0–14 years): Account for 13.4% of the population.
- Economically Active (15–64 years): Form the largest share at 67.3%, peaking in the 35–39 age cohort (8.62%).
- Elderly Dependants (65+ years): Comprise 19.4% of residents.

This distribution presents clear socio-economic impacts. The sizable working population supports economic productivity and generates high demand for family housing and primary education. Conversely, the high proportion of elderly residents increases the old-age dependency ratio, placing greater demand on local healthcare infrastructure, eldercare facilities, and accessible public amenities.

Age Group (years)	Males	Females	Total Population	% of Total Population
0–4	3,210	3,110	6,320	3.81
5–9	4,160	3,880	8,040	4.85
10–14	3,930	3,820	7,750	4.68
15–19	3,990	4,020	8,010	4.83
20–24	4,380	4,230	8,610	5.20
25–29	5,170	5,080	10,250	6.19
30–34	5,510	6,100	11,610	7.01
35–39	6,810	7,480	14,290	8.62
40–44	5,550	6,200	11,750	7.09
45–49	5,280	5,950	11,230	6.78
50–54	5,670	6,190	11,860	7.16
55–59	5,720	5,990	11,710	7.07
60–64	6,050	6,080	12,130	7.32
65–69	5,670	6,020	11,690	7.06
70–74	4,600	4,820	9,420	5.69
75–79	2,910	3,140	6,050	3.65
80–84	1,080	1,430	2,510	1.51
85–89	670	930	1,600	0.97
90+	270	610	880	0.53
0–14	11,300	10,810	22,110	13.4
15–64	54,130	57,320	111,450	67.3
65+	15,200	16,950	32,150	19.4

=== Housing composition and urban land use ===
Land use in Bukit Batok is heavily dominated by public residential developments:

- HDB Flats: House 77.4% of residents, with 4-room flats being the modal housing type (33.9%).
- Private Housing: Condominiums (18.6%) and landed properties (3.3%) make up the remainder.

The high rate of home ownership (92.9%) and an average household size of 3.03 persons reflect a stable, family-oriented suburban community.

Resident population by dwelling type in Bukit Batok (2000−2026)
Year	HDB flats		Condominiums and other apartments		Landed properties	
Year	Pop.	Percentage	Pop.	Percentage	Pop.	Percentage
2000	111,450	88%	10,660	8.4%	3,780	3%
2005	108,710	80.3%	21,960	16.2%	4,150	3.1%
2010	114,360	79.3%	24,630	17.1%	4,480	3.1%
2015	108,240	77.7%	24,570	17.6%	5,620	4%
2020	124,750	78.9%	26,500	16.8%	5,760	3.6%
2025	129,890	78.3%	29,390	17.7%	5,480	3.3%
2026	128,300	77.4%	30,840	18.6%	5,400	3.3%

=== Cultural diversity and economic profile ===
Bukit Batok demonstrates significant socio-cultural diversity and economic stability:

- Ethnicity & Language: The population is predominantly Chinese (70.7%), followed by Malays (16.3%), Indians (9.9%), and Others (3.1%). English (54.7%) and Mandarin (27.7%) are the primary household languages.
- Religious Pluralism: Buddhism is the primary religion (30.6%), followed by no religious affiliation (19.2%), Islam (18.2%), and Christianity (15.9%).
- Socio-Economic Indicators: Educational attainment and employment rates are high, with 37.3% holding university qualifications and an active workforce employment rate of 97.1%. Household income distribution is concentrated in the middle-to-upper brackets, with 22.4% earning between S$15,000 and S$24,999 monthly.

Ethnic groups in Bukit Batok (2000−2025)
Year	Chinese		Malays		Indians		Others	
Year	Pop.	Percentage	Pop.	Percentage	Pop.	Percentage	Pop.	Percentage
2000	93,502	73.8%	21,564	17%	10,546	8.3%	1,031	0.8%
2010	104,266	72.3%	20,482	14.2%	15,257	10.6%	4,193	2.9%
2015	102,080	73.3%	19,570	14.1%	13,730	9.9%	3,900	2.8%
2020	113,460	71.8%	25,240	16%	14,950	9.5%	4,380	2.8%
2025	117,210	70.7%	26,990	16.3%	16,430	9.9%	5,210	3.1%

Religious affiliation in Bukit Batok (2025 est.)
1. Buddhism (30.6%)
2. No religion (19.2%)
3. Islam (18.2%)
4. Christianity (15.9%)
5. Taoism (10.0%)
6. Hinduism (5.90%)
7. Sikhism (0.10%)

Highest qualification attained of non-student resident population aged 15 years and over (2025 est.)
Qualification	Percentage	Singapore average
Below secondary	19.5%	19.9%
Secondary	14.3%	14.6%
Post-secondary (non-tertiary)	11.3%	11.1%
Polytechnic diploma	10.2%	10.2%
Professional qualification and other diploma	7.6%	7.5%
University	37.3%	36.7%

Languages most frequently spoken at home, Bukit Batok (2025 est.)
Languages	percent
English	54.7%
Mandarin Chinese	27.7%
Malay	8.5%
Non-Mandarin varieties	3.7%
Tamil	3.25%
Others	1.15%
Other Indian languages	0.95%

Gross monthly employment income of employed residents aged 15 years and over (2025 est.)
Employment income	Percentage	Singapore average
Below S$1,000	4.4%	3.9%
S$1,000–S$1,999	8.3%	9.4%
S$2,000–S$2,999	10.1%	9.5%
S$3,000–S$3,999	11.1%	10.3%
S$4,000–S$4,999	9.8%	8.8%
S$5,000–S$5,999	8.3%	8.2%
S$6,000–S$6,999	7.0%	6.9%
S$7,000–S$7,999	5.5%	5.9%
S$8,000–S$8,999	5.4%	5.2%
S$9,000–S$9,999	4.9%	4.5%
S$10,000–S$10,999	4.7%	4.3%
S$11,000–S$11,999	3.4%	3.5%
S$12,000–S$14,999	7.1%	7.3%
S$15,000–S$19,999	5.6%	5.8%
S$20,000 and over	4.4%	6.7%

Monthly household employment income (2025 est.)
Household employment income	Percentage	Singapore average
No employed person	11.7%	14.2%
Below S$1,000	1.4%	1.2%
S$1,000–S$1,999	2.4%	3.4%
S$2,000–S$2,999	4.3%	3.7%
S$3,000–S$3,999	4.7%	4.2%
S$4,000–S$4,999	3.9%	3.7%
S$5,000–S$5,999	4.7%	4.1%
S$6,000–S$6,999	4.4%	4.0%
S$7,000–S$7,999	4.7%	3.6%
S$8,000–S$8,999	4.9%	3.8%
S$9,000–S$9,999	4.1%	3.7%
S$10,000–S$10,999	3.8%	3.8%
S$11,000–S$11,999	3.5%	3.7%
S$12,000–S$12,999	4.1%	3.5%
S$13,000–S$13,999	3.6%	3.2%
S$14,000–S$14,999	2.5%	2.8%
S$15,000–S$17,499	6.0%	6.2%
S$17,500–S$19,999	6.9%	5.5%
S$20,000–S$24,999	7.9%	8.0%
S$25,000–S$29,999	4.6%	5.0%
S$30,000–S$34,999	3.2%	3.3%
S$35,000 and over	3.0%	5.5%

== Commercial activities ==
Commercial activities in Bukit Batok demonstrate a hierarchical distribution of urban land use, comprising regional commercial nodes, neighbourhood centres, and designated industrial zones.

At the regional level, West Mall and the adjacent Bukit Batok Town Centre serve as the primary commercial hub. Strategically co-located with major transport nodes—namely Bukit Batok MRT station and the Bukit Batok Bus Interchange—this central business node maximizes accessibility for the wider population, providing high-order goods, dining, and civic services like the Bukit Batok Public Library.

At the local scale, lower-order neighbourhood commercial centres, such as Bukit Batok West Shopping Centre, are decentralized across residential estates. These centres minimize friction of distance for residents by offering convenient access to threshold goods and everyday conveniences.

Additionally, industrial land use is segregated into dedicated zones along Bukit Batok Street 23 and Street 24, including Bukit Batok Industrial Estate Park A. These areas support manufacturing and warehousing, reflecting functional zonation to separate light industrial activities from residential areas while maintaining economic diversity within the town.

== Transport ==
Bukit Batok is served by an integrated transport network comprising rail services, public buses and major roads connecting residential neighbourhoods with surrounding areas like Tengah and the wider island.

=== Rail ===
The town is served by Bukit Batok MRT station and Bukit Gombak MRT station on the North–South Line. Connectivity will expand with Bukit Batok West MRT station on the Jurong Region Line and Brickland MRT station, an infill North–South Line station targeted for completion in 2034.

=== Bus ===
Opened in 1987, Bukit Batok Bus Interchange serves as the primary transit hub. Most bus services operating from the interchange are managed by Tower Transit Singapore under the Bulim bus package, alongside operations by SMRT Buses and SBS Transit.

=== Roads ===
Major thoroughfares, including Bukit Batok Road and various East and West avenues, connect local estates to regional road networks and support public bus routes, though peak-period traffic congestion remains a subject of urban planning discussions.

== Public service and utility ==
Many public agencies and municipal service providers serving Bukit Batok are concentrated around Bukit Batok Central near the town's transport hub.

=== Public administration and municipal services ===
The Housing & Development Board (HDB) branch and Jurong-Clementi-Bukit Batok Town Council office are both located at Block 630 Bukit Batok Central to manage public housing and estate administration.

=== Public safety and emergency services ===
The Singapore Police Force operates the Bukit Batok Neighbourhood Police Centre (NPC) at 21 Bukit Batok East Avenue 4 and a self-service post at Block 103 Bukit Batok Central. In late 2025, the Bukit Batok and Bukit Panjang NPCs merged to enhance operational effectiveness. Fire and rescue services are provided by Bukit Batok Fire Station at 80 Bukit Batok Road.

=== Postal services and utilities ===
Singapore Post operates Bukit Batok Central Post Office in West Mall. Water supply and drainage overseen by PUB are integrated into the national infrastructure network.

== Education ==
Bukit Batok features educational institutions spanning primary, secondary, pre-university, special, and international education, as well as vocational and driving training.

=== Primary schools ===
The town includes six primary schools: Dazhong, Keming, Lianhua, Princess Elizabeth, St. Anthony’s, and Bukit View. Princess Elizabeth Primary School, established in 1956, relocated to Bukit Batok West Avenue 3 in 1986.

=== Secondary schools ===
Five government secondary schools serve the area: Bukit Batok, Bukit View, Dunearn, Hillgrove, and Swiss Cottage. Bukit Batok Secondary School opened in 1986 and was rebuilt under the PRIME initiative in 2008.

=== Pre-university education ===
Millennia Institute at Bukit Batok West Avenue 8 is Singapore's only centralised institute offering a three-year GCE A-Level programme. Formed in 2004 via the merger of Outram and Jurong Institutes, it moved to its present campus in 2006.

=== Special education ===
Eden School operates two campuses in Bukit Batok (West Avenue 2 and 3) serving students on the autism spectrum. St. Andrew’s Mission School temporarily operates along Bukit Batok Street 25, offering national curriculum education tailored for students with autism.

=== International education ===
Dulwich College (Singapore) operates an international school campus on Bukit Batok West Avenue 8, offering early childhood through secondary education.

=== Vocational and professional education ===
Bukit Batok houses the Bukit Batok Driving Centre, while SHATEC previously operated a hospitality training campus at Bukit Batok Street 22 prior to phasing out its full qualification programmes.

== Recreation ==
Bukit Batok features a variety of public parks, sports venues, and recreational facilities.

=== Parks and nature recreation ===
Bukit Batok Town Park (Little Guilin) is a 42-hectare former granite quarry converted into a scenic lake surrounded by rock formations. Nearby, the 36-hectare Bukit Batok Nature Park offers walking trails around a quarry site, a 3.87 km hiking route, and a World War II memorial plaque. The 1.5 km Bukit Batok East Park Connector links Town Park to the broader park connector network.

=== Sports and swimming facilities ===
Sport Singapore operates Bukit Gombak Stadium, Bukit Gombak Sport Centre (including an ActiveSG Gym), and the Bukit Batok Swimming Complex, which features competition, teaching, and wading pools.

=== Family and community recreation ===
The Civil Service Club clubhouse at Bukit Batok provides public and member leisure amenities, including a water park, bowling center, and swimming pools. Community-based social and sporting activities are supported by local community clubs under the People's Association.

== Government and administration ==
The Bukit Batok planning area is served by two town councils, which are responsible for managing public housing estates and providing municipal services to residents.

- Jurong-Clementi-Bukit Batok Town Council: Oversees the Jurong East–Bukit Batok Group Representation Constituency (GRC), which includes the Bukit Batok and Bukit Batok East electoral divisions.
- Chua Chu Kang Town Council: Oversees Bukit Gombak Single Member Constituency (SMC), which borders the Bukit Batok area.
