= Guilin (disambiguation) =

Guilin may refer to:

- Guilin, a prefecture-level city in the northeast of China's Guangxi Zhuang Autonomous Region
- Guilin, Singapore, a subzone of Bukit Batok
- Guilin Laurent Bizanet (1755–1836), a Republican French Revolutionary General
- Gui Lin (born 1993), a table tennis player from Brazil
- Peadar Ó Guilín, an Irish novelist
