= Bukit Gombak =

- Subzone of Bukit Batok Planning Area & Housing Estate

Name transcription(s)
  - Chinese: 武吉甘柏; Wǔjí Gānbó (Pinyin); Bú-kit Kam-pek (Hokkien POJ)
  - Malay: Bukit Gombak (Rumi) بوکيت ڬومبق (Jawi)
  - Tamil: புக்கிட் கோம்பாக் Pukkiṭ Kōmpāk (Transliteration)
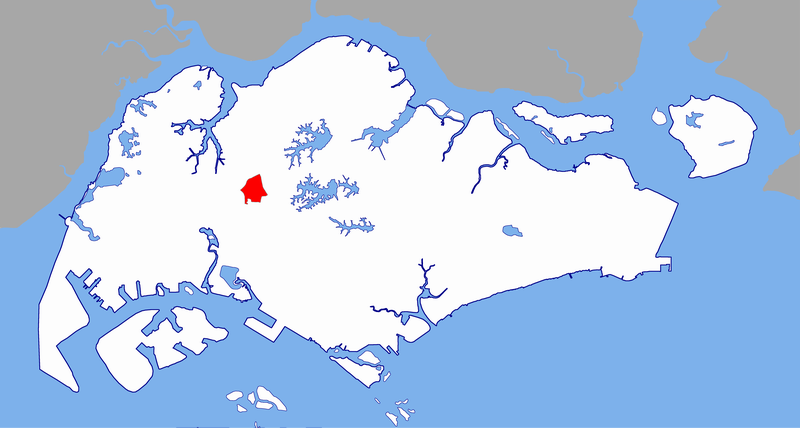
- Coordinates: 1°22′09.5″N 103°45′26.9″E
- Country: Singapore

Area
  - Total: 2.46 km^{2} (0.95 sq mi)

Population (2026)
  - Total: 9,870
  - Density: 4,010/km^{2} (10,400/sq mi)

Bukit Gombak is a subzone of Bukit Batok, Singapore. It is a hilly neighbourhood in the west-central area of the Southeast Asian city-state of Singapore. In the Malay language, bukit means hill and gombak a bunch or collection of something. The neighbourhood consists of two hills. One of them stands at 133m while the other stands at 113m. They are Singapore's second and third highest natural point after Bukit Timah Hill.

Bukit Gombak is bounded by Bukit Batok Road, West Avenue 5, the North side of Bukit Gombak Sports Complex, West and North side of Town Park, the North-West and North side of the landed housing estate along Hillview Avenue, Upper Bukit Timah Road and Choa Chu Kang Road. It is generally regarded as the area around the elevated Mass Rapid Transit (MRT) train station of the same name (NS3), including the hills to the east of the station and HDB apartment blocks along Bukit Batok West Avenue 5 and East Avenue 5. The Tower Transit feeder bus service 945 from the Bukit Batok bus interchange plies the general area.

== Places ==
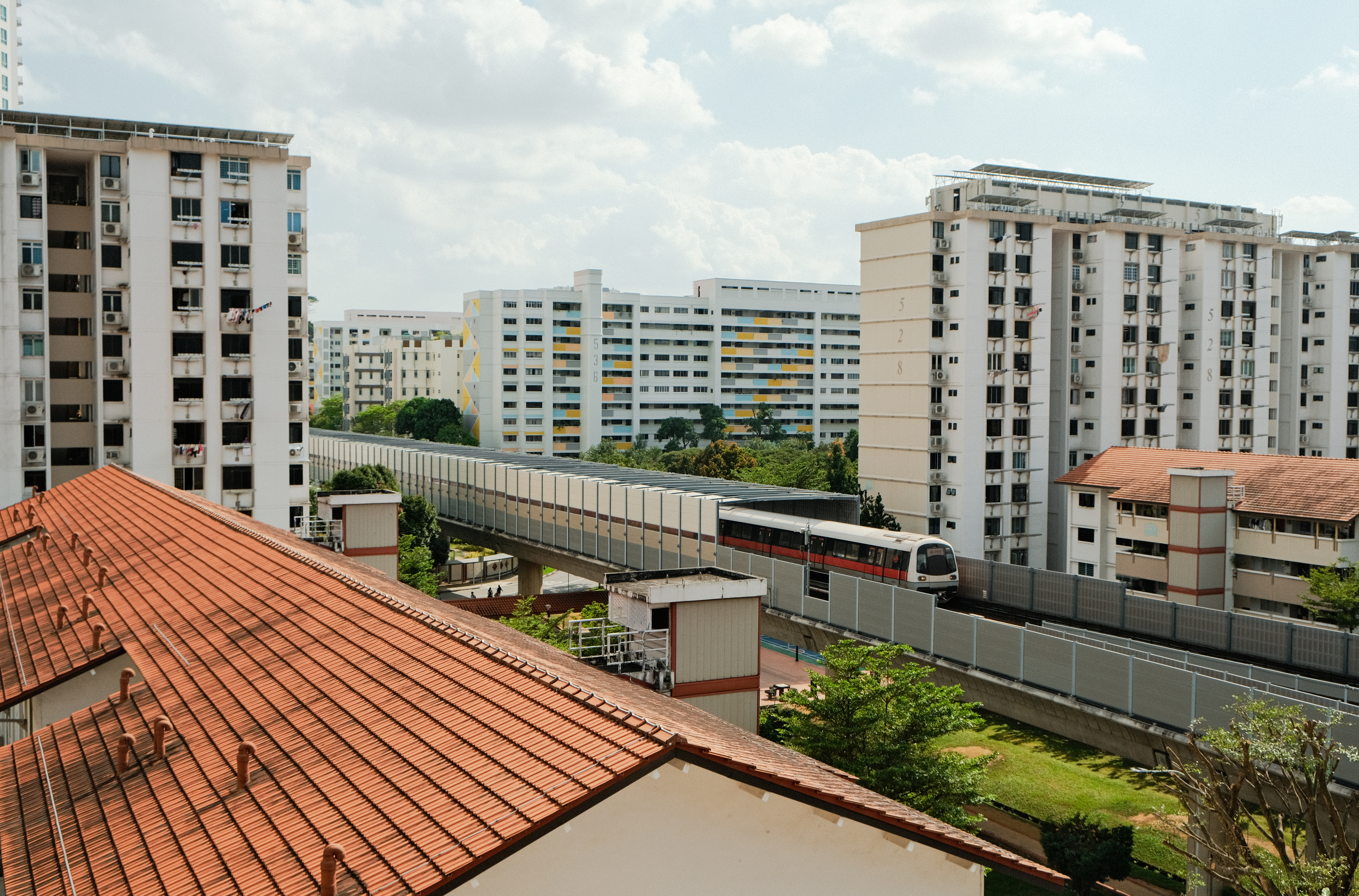
Aerial view of the town of Bukit Gombak

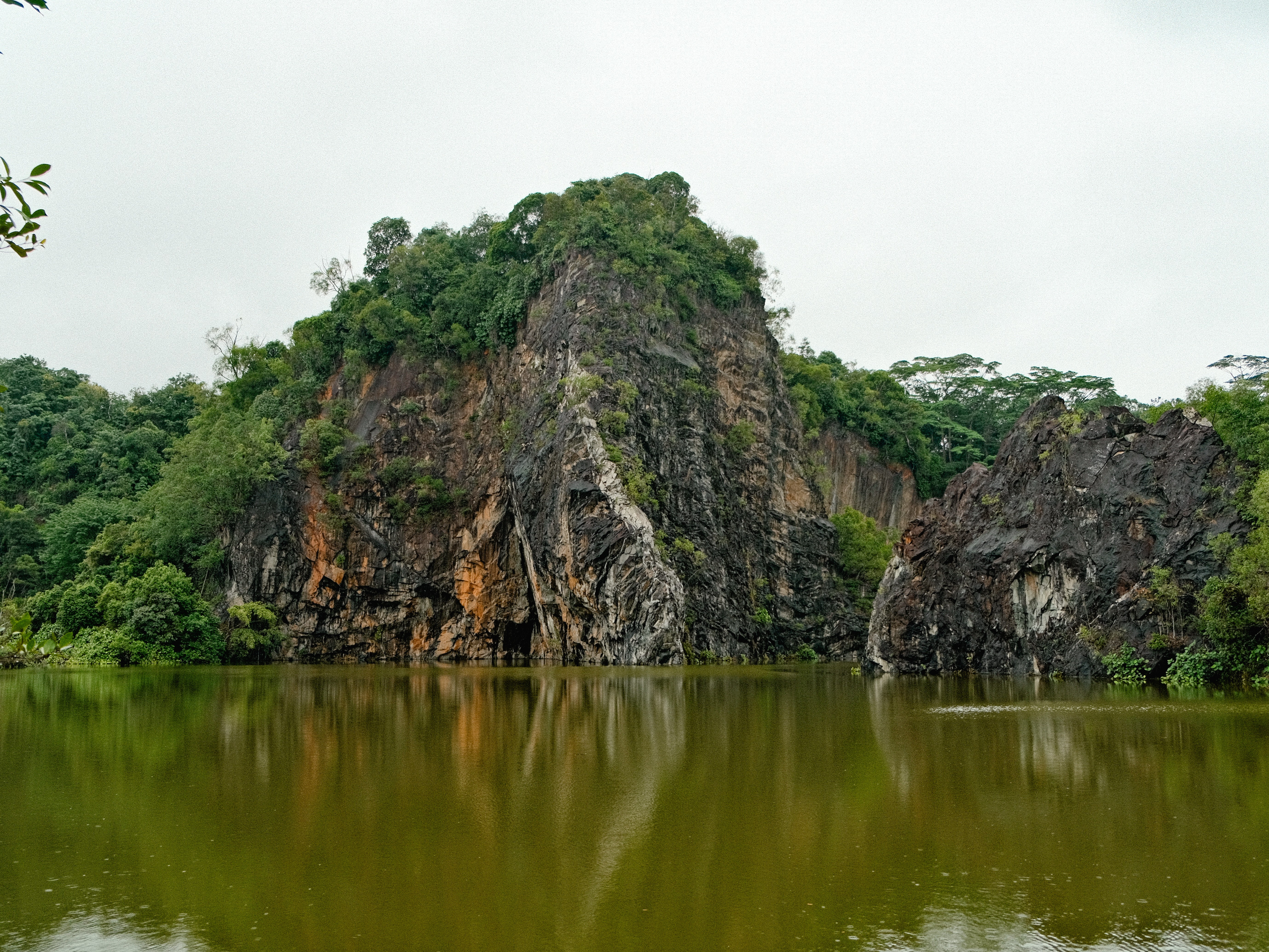
Little Guilin, a popular park amongst residents

- Singapore's Ministry of Defence headquarters
- Bukit Gombak Stadium
- Bukit Gombak Sports Hall
- Zu-Lin Temple Association
- Grace Assembly of God Church
- Bukit Batok Town Park
- Little Guilin
- Lianhua Primary School
- St. Anthony's Primary School
- Hillgrove Secondary School
- Swiss Cottage Secondary School
- Guilin View Condominium
- The Madeira Condominium

== Politics ==
Most of Bukit Gombak was in the purview of the namesake Bukit Gombak SMC, which was carved from the Chua Chu Kang GRC in 2025, which is overseen by its South West CDC mayor and Senior Minister of State Low Yen Ling. Some of Bukit Gombak also belong to the Bukit Batok East and Hong Kah North divisions of the Jurong East-Bukit Batok GRC (previously called Jurong GRC).

Bukit Gombak SMC was first created in 1988 from its Bukit Batok constituency, and existed until 2001 where it was redrawn into Hong Kah GRC, now renamed to the present-day Chua Chu Kang GRC in 2011. Similarly, Hong Kah North was also created as a SMC in 2011, until in 2025 where it was redrawn into Jurong East-Bukit Batok GRC.
