= Hillview MRT station =

Mass Rapid Transit station in Singapore

Hillview DT3 山景 ஹில்வியூ
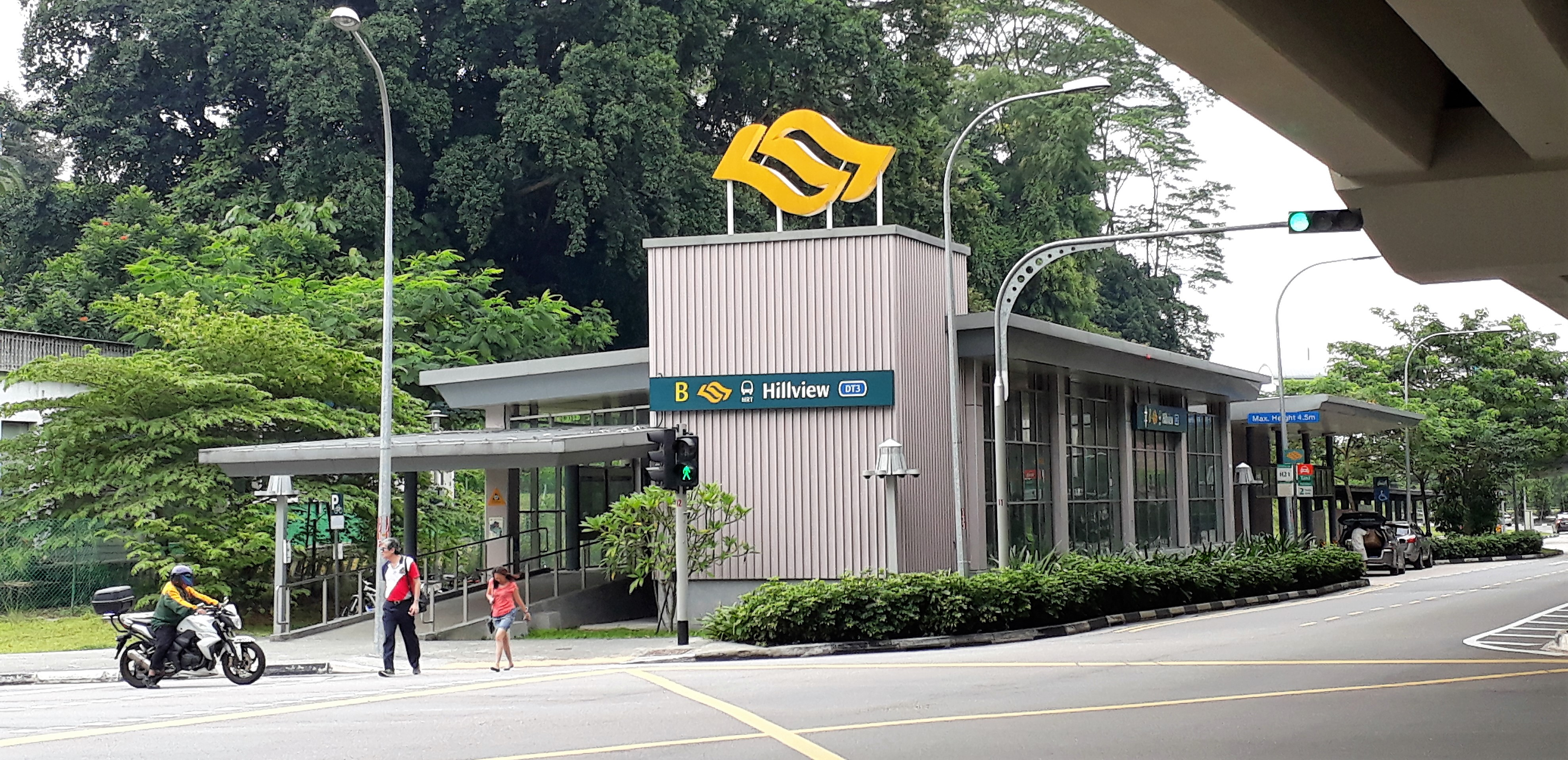
- Exit B of Hillview Station

General information
- Location: 510 Upper Bukit Timah Road, Singapore 678211
- Coordinates: 01°21′45″N 103°46′03″E
- System: Mass Rapid Transit (MRT) station
- Owner: Land Transport Authority
- Operator: SBS Transit
- Line: Downtown Line
- Platforms: 2 (1 island platform)
- Tracks: 2
- Connections: Bus, Taxi

Construction
- Structure type: Underground
- Platform levels: 1
- Accessible: Yes

Other information
- Station code: HVW

History
- Opened: 27 December 2015; 10 years ago
- Former names: Dairy Farm, Upper Bukit Timah

Passengers
- June 2024: 7,132 per day

Services
Preceding station	Mass Rapid Transit	Following station
Cashew towards Bukit Panjang	Downtown Line	Hume towards Expo
Track layout
Location
- Location within Singapore Rail

Hillview MRT station is an underground Mass Rapid Transit (MRT) station on the Downtown Line, situated on the boundaries of Hillview and Nature Reserve planning subzones of Bukit Batok and Bukit Panjang respectively, Singapore.

The station serves the Upper Bukit Timah corridor, at the junction between Upper Bukit Timah Road, Dairy Farm Road and Hillview Road. It is in close proximity to the Bukit Timah Nature Reserve. The vicinity is largely residential, with commercial buildings such as The Rail Mall and HillV2 within walking distance.

== History ==
The station was first announced in July 2008 when the DTL2 stations were announced. Contract 913 for this station, Cashew and associated tunnels was awarded to GS Engineering & Construction Corp at S$431 million (U$297 million). The station was opened on 27 December 2015 as part of the Downtown Line Stage 2, with free travel on the Downtown Line until 1 January 2016.

== Details ==
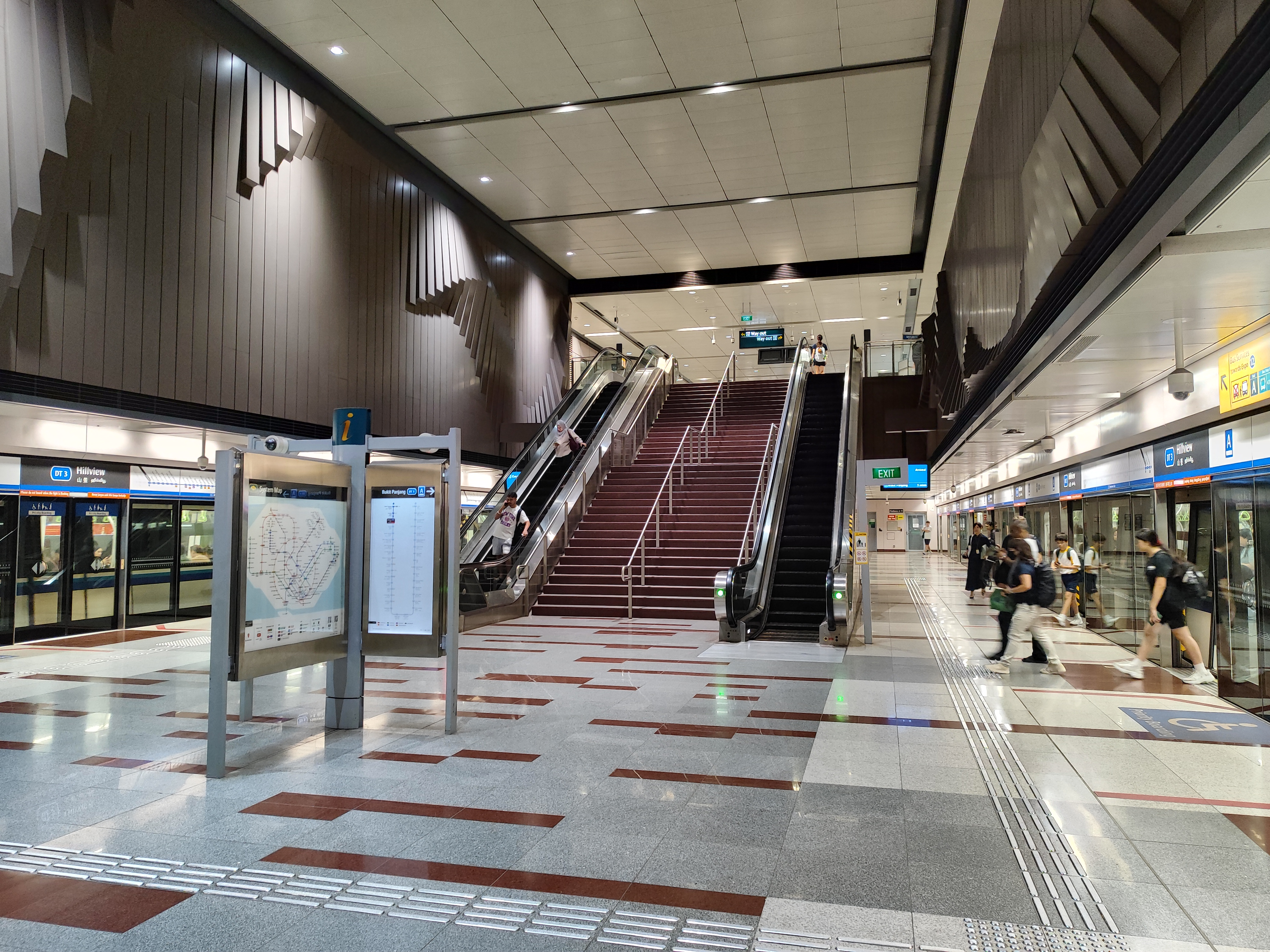
Platform level of Hillview station

Until 2025, the section of tracks between Hillview station and Beauty World MRT station was the longest between any two MRT stations on the Downtown Line. There used to be basic structural provisions for a future station (also known as a "box station") along this section of tracks near Hume Avenue. Hume MRT station was confirmed on 7 March 2019 and was opened for public commuters on 28 February 2025.

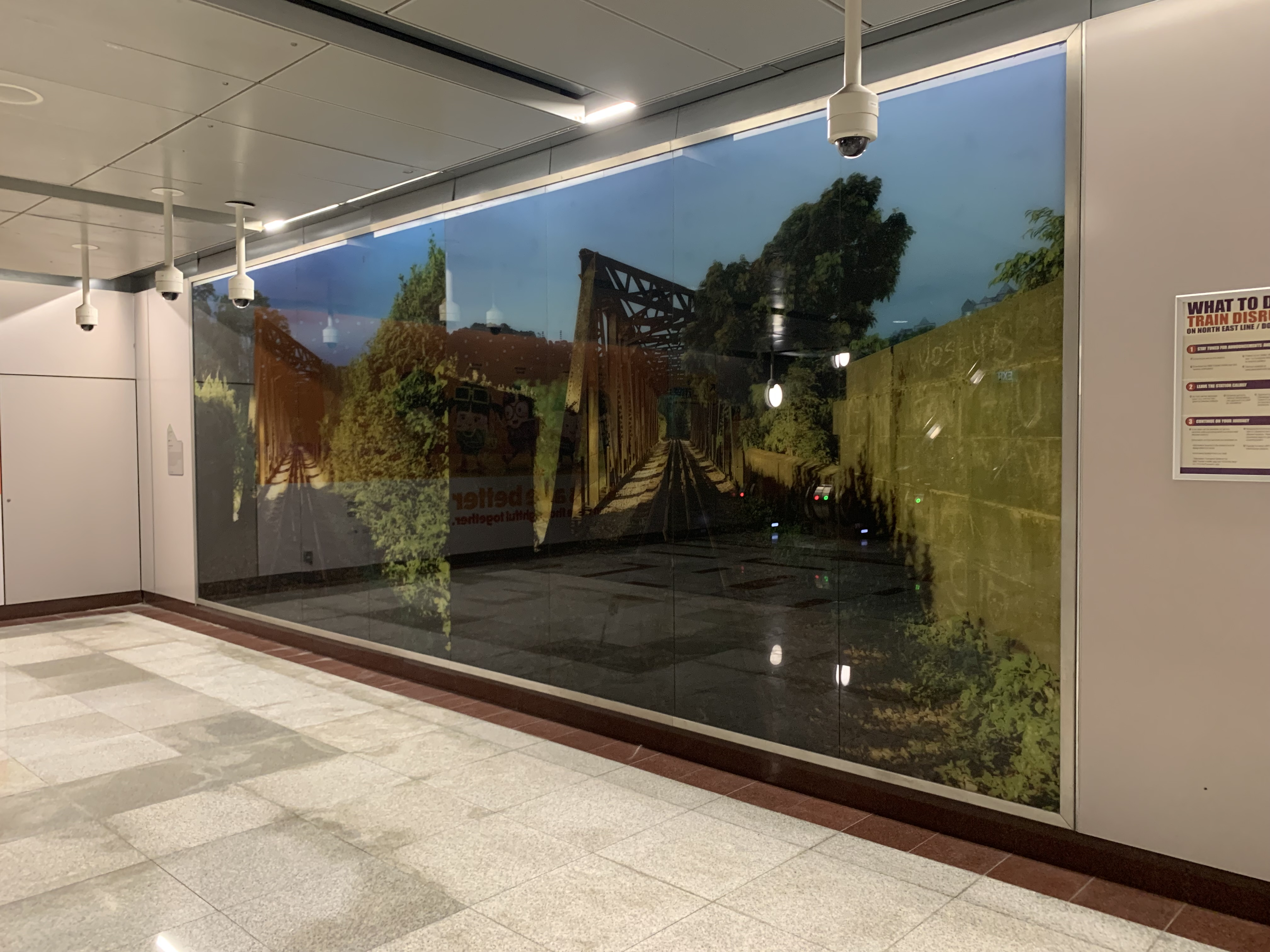
The artwork by Darren Soh

=== Artwork ===
"What Remains" by Darren Soh is an artwork that documents the remnants of the KTM railway line.
