= Dunearn Secondary School =

Secondary school in Singapore

Dunearn Secondary School is a government secondary school located in Bukit Batok, Singapore.

== History ==
Dunearn Secondary School was established in 1962 as Dunearn Government Chinese Middle School. In 1969, it amalgamated with Dunearn Vocational School to become Dunearn Secondary School. The Chinese stream was phased out in 1986. It moved from Dunearn Road to its present location in 1993. In 2003, Dunearn was Ranked 48TH in the GCE 'O' Level Examination 2002.
