= Brickworks, Singapore =

Brickworks
- Subzone of Bukit Batok Planning Area & Housing Estate
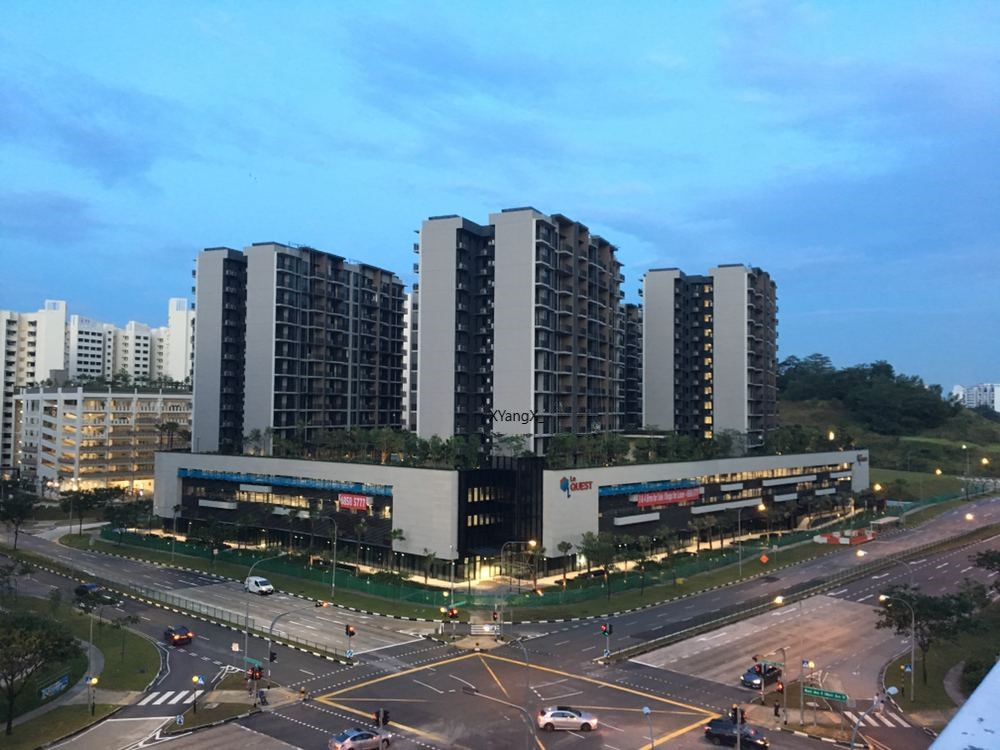
- Bukit Batok West Extension
- Interactive map of Brickworks
- Coordinates: 1.356°N 103.742°E
- Country: Singapore
- Town: Bukit Batok

Area
  - Total: 1.23 km^{2} (0.47 sq mi)

Population (2026)
  - Total: 31,900
  - Density: 25,900/km^{2} (67,200/sq mi)

Brickworks (also known as Bukit Batok West Extension) is a subzone of Bukit Batok, Singapore. It is bounded by Bukit Batok West Avenue 3/2/5 and Bukit Batok Road and is located beside Tengah.

== Public and private housing ==
In recent years, several new HDB developments have been launched in the area.

List of Public Housing Developments
Name	Launch dates
West Ridges @ Bukit Batok	November 2013
West Valley @ Bukit Batok	May 2014
West Crest @ Bukit Batok	May 2014
West Terra @ Bukit Batok	September 2014
West Edge @ Bukit Batok	November 2015
West Quarry @ Bukit Batok	November 2015
West Plains @ Bukit Batok	February 2016
West Scape @ Bukit Batok	August 2017
West Hill @ Bukit Batok	February 2021
Harmony Village	February 2021
West Glade @ Bukit Batok	November 2022
West BrickVille @ Bukit Batok	October 2024

List of Condominiums
Name	Launch Dates	Remark
Le Quest		Private Housing & Neighbourhood Centre
Altura	2023 Q1	Executive Condominium
Lumina Grand	2023 Q2	Executive Condominium

== Commercial and recreation facilities ==
A commercial and private residential development known as Le Quest was opened in October 2020, serving as a neighborhood centre. A new hawker centre will be built beside Le Quest. Bukit Batok Hillside Park is also in this area.

S/N	Name	Purposes
1)	Le Quest	Private Housing & Neighbourhood Centre
2）	Bukit Batok Hawker Centre	Public Housing & Hawker Centre
3）	Bukit Batok Hillside Park	Nature Park
4)	West Rock @ Bukit Batok Park	Neighbourhood Park

== Transportation ==
There are few bus services passing through Bukit Batok West Extension such as 991, 941 and 944. 160M was launched in July 2020. The area will also be served by the upcoming Jurong Region line.

Bus Services
Service	Type	Serving
993	Loop	Jurong East - Bukit Batok (Previously 160M)
941	Loop	Bukit Batok
992	Loop	Bukit Batok - Tengah (Previously 944)
991	Pass-By	Choa Chu Kang - Bukit Batok

MRT
Service	Station Names	Launch
Jurong Region line	Tengah Park	

== Healthcare and education amenities ==
There are also more amenities that can be found in the area of Bukit Batok West Extension.

List of healthcare and education facilities
S/N	Name	Purposes
1)	Millennia Institute	Education
2)	Eden School	Education
3)	Dulwich College (Singapore)	Education
4)	Bukit Batok Care Home	Healthcare
