= Guilin, Singapore =

Guilin
- Subzone of Bukit Batok Planning Area & Housing Estate

Name transcription(s)
- Interactive map of Guilin
- Coordinates: 1°21′20″N 103°45′11″E
- Country: Singapore

Area
  - Total: 1.09 km^{2} (0.42 sq mi)

Population (2026)
  - Total: 12,650
  - Density: 11,600/km^{2} (30,100/sq mi)

Guilin is a subzone of Bukit Batok. It is bounded by East Avenue 2, Central, West Avenue 2/5, the north side of Bukit Gombak Sports Complex, the west and north perimeters of Town Park, the west perimeter of landed housing estates along Hillview Avenue, and Hillview Avenue.

== Places ==
Guilin takes its name from Xiao Guilin (小桂林), an area within Bukit Batok Town Park. Directly translated to Little Guilin, this section of the park is named after the Guilin region in China - sporting a granite quarry within a small pond.

== Politics ==
It is part of Bukit Gombak SMC and is currently represented by Low Yen Ling of the People's Action Party
