= Bukit Batok Nature Park =

Park in Singapore

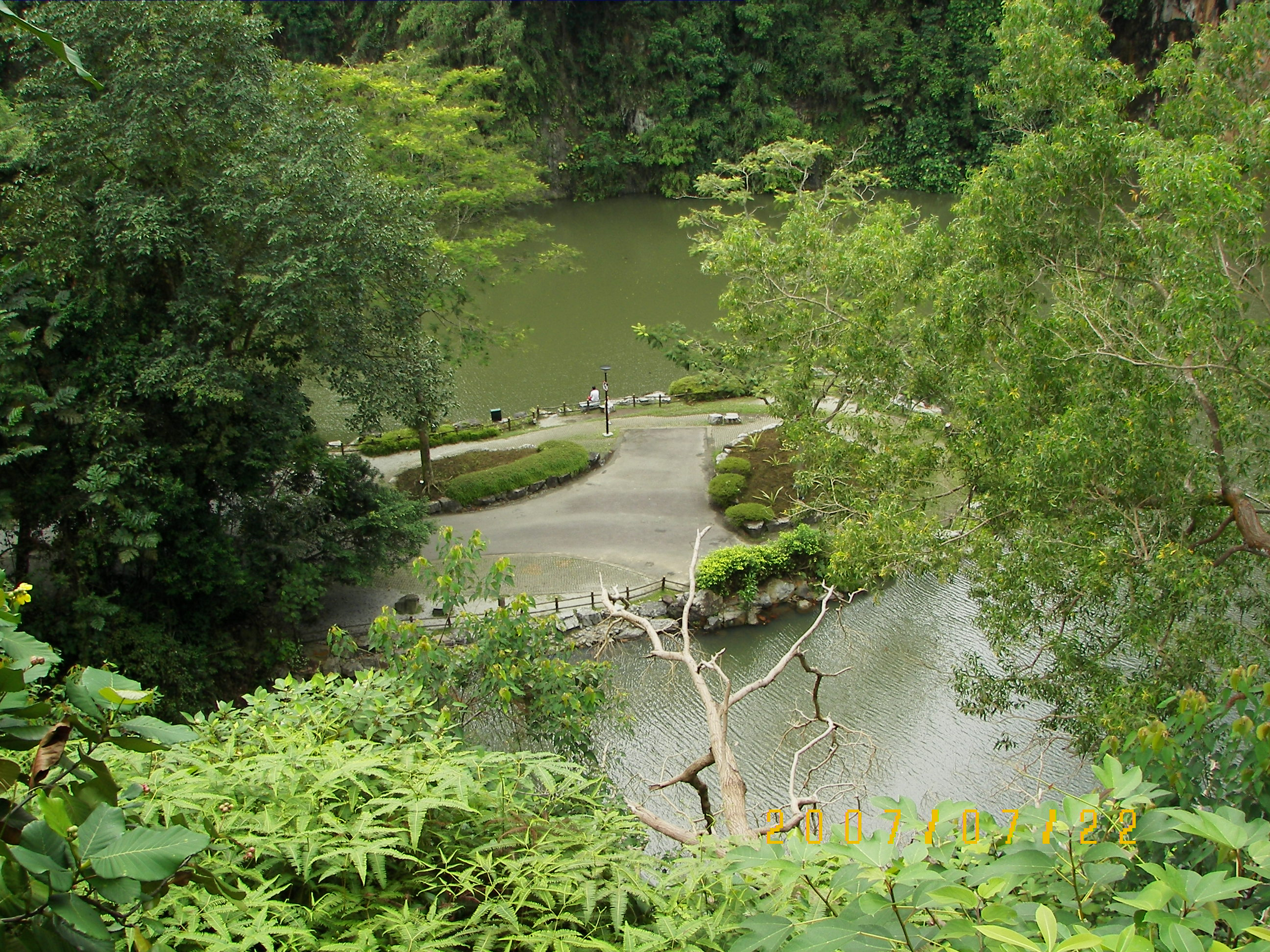
- A view of the park from the edge of Lookout Point 1 in 2007
- Interactive map of Bukit Batok Nature Park
- Type: Urban park
- Location: Bukit Batok, Singapore
- Coordinates: 1°21′03″N 103°45′53″E
- Area: 36 hectares (89 acres)
- Created: 1988
- Operator: National Parks Board
- Status: Open all year
- Website: Official website

Bukit Batok Nature Park is a 36-hectare (89-acre) urban park in Bukit Batok, Singapore. It is situated near Bukit Batok East Avenue 2, Bukit Batok East Avenue 6, and Lorong Sesuai. It is also near to the junction of Jalan Jurong Kechil and De Souza Avenue where The Sen condo is.

== History ==
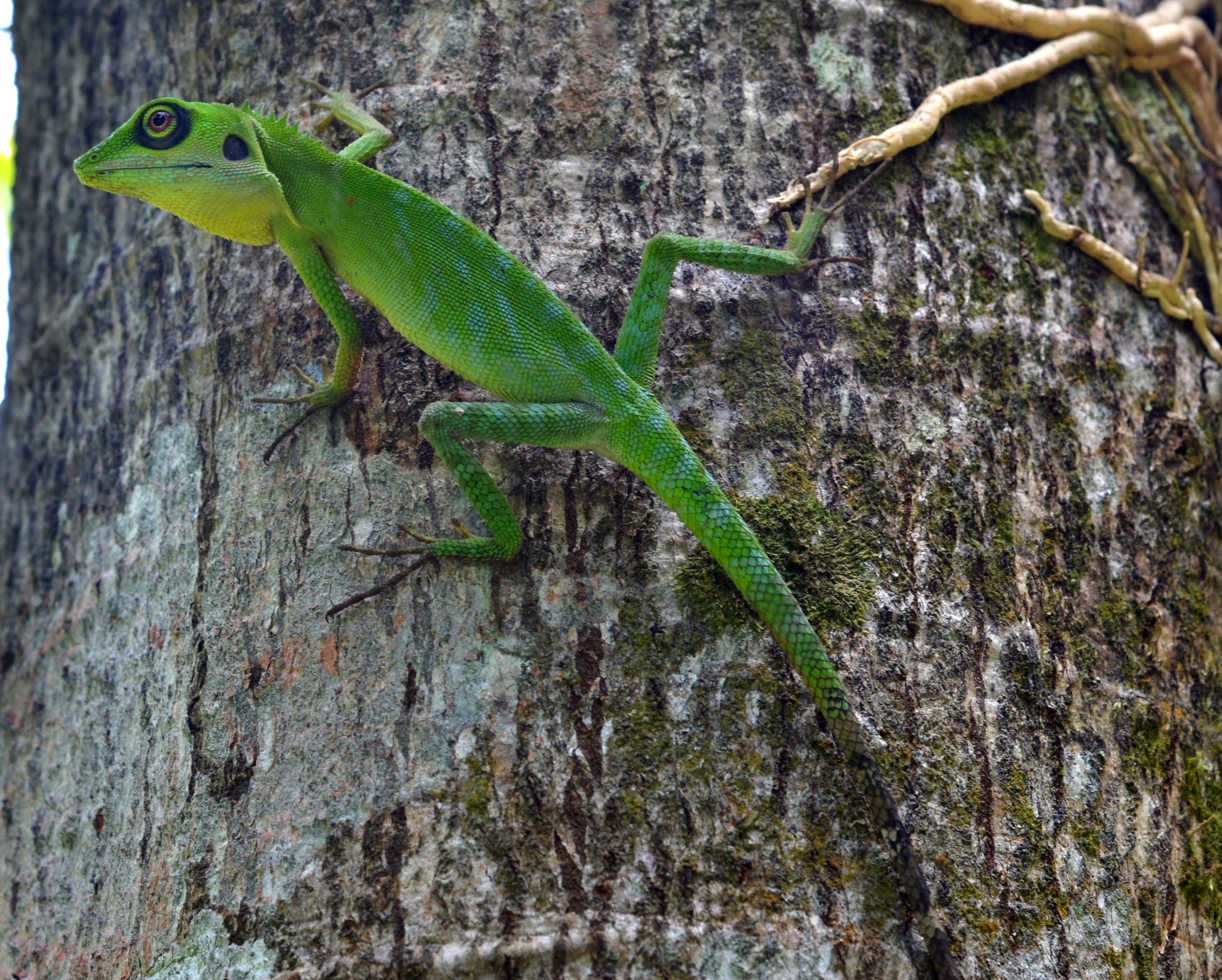
The Green crested lizard can be spotted at the Bukit Batok Nature Park

The park was developed on an abandoned quarry site in 1988.

== See also ==
- Bukit Batok Town Park
- List of parks in Singapore
