= Bukit Batok Secondary School =

Bukit Batok Secondary School 武吉巴督中学 Sekolah Menengah Bukit Batok புக்கிட் பாதோக் உயர்நிலைப்பள்ளி

Location
- 50 Bukit Batok West Avenue 8 Bukit Batok, 658962; Singapore

Information
- Type: Government, Autonomous
- Motto: Be Our Best
- Founded: 1986; 40 years ago
- Session: Single
- School code: 3044
- Principal: Shirley Lee
- Gender: Co-ed
- Color: Red Gold
- Website: www.bukitbatoksec.moe.edu.sg

Bukit Batok Secondary School is a co-educational government secondary school located in Bukit Batok, Singapore.

== History ==
Bukit Batok Secondary School was first opened in 1986, housed in a S$8.2 million campus at the junction of Bukit Batok West Avenues 3 and 8. In 1988, air-conditioners were installed in the school's library, language lab and computer room. On 9 April that year, the school was officially opened by Chai Chong Yii, Member of Parliament for Bukit Batok SMC.

From 2006 to 2008, the school was rebuilt for S$25.48 million under the PRIME scheme. School Advisory Committee members and parents raised another S$661,220 in two years for non-standard items such as an air-conditioned multi-purpose hall and a viewing gallery for the Indoor Sports Hall.
