= Bukit Batok MRT station =

Mass Rapid Transit station in Singapore

Bukit Batok NS2 武吉巴督 புக்கிட் பாத்தோக்
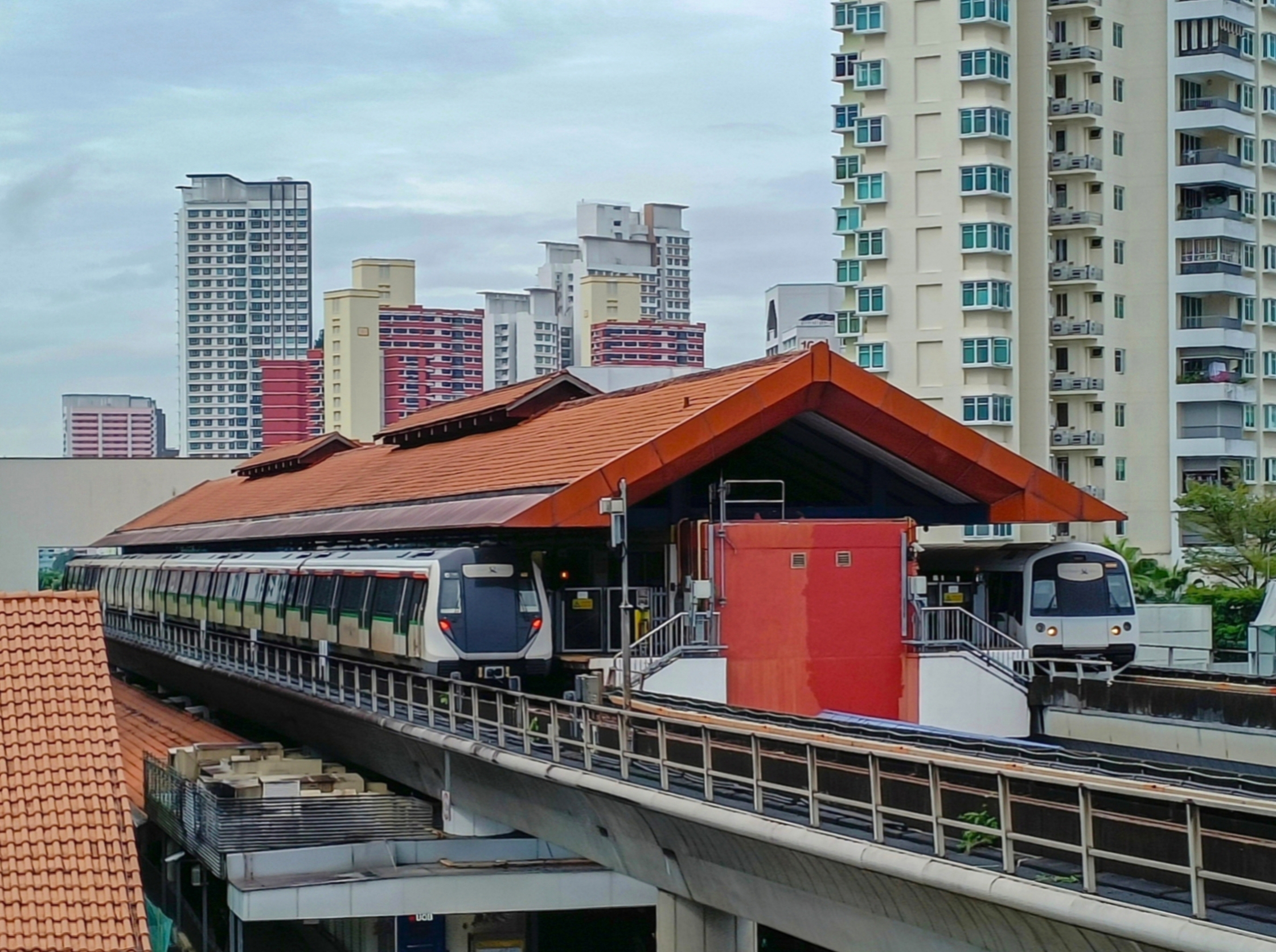
- Exterior of the station

General information
- Location: 10 Bukit Batok Central, Singapore 659958
- Coordinates: 01°20′57″N 103°44′59″E
- System: Mass Rapid Transit (MRT) station
- Owner: Land Transport Authority
- Operator: SMRT Trains
- Line: North–South Line
- Platforms: 2 (1 island platform)
- Tracks: 2
- Connections: Bukit Batok, Taxi

Construction
- Structure type: Elevated
- Platform levels: 1
- Cycle facilities: Yes
- Accessible: Yes (except for Exit A)

Other information
- Station code: BBT

History
- Opened: 10 March 1990; 36 years ago
- Former names: Bukit Batok South

Passengers
- June 2024: 25,059 per day

Services
Preceding station	Mass Rapid Transit	Following station
Jurong East Terminus	North–South Line	Bukit Gombak towards Marina South Pier
Former services
Preceding station	Mass Rapid Transit	Following station
Jurong East Terminus	Branch Line	Bukit Gombak towards Choa Chu Kang
Track layout
Location
- Location within Singapore Rail

Bukit Batok MRT station is an above-ground Mass Rapid Transit (MRT) station on the North–South Line (NSL) in Bukit Batok, Singapore. Operated by SMRT Trains, the station serves nearby landmarks including Bukit Batok Bus Interchange, West Mall, and Bukit Batok Library. Like other stations in the former Branch Line stretch, it has an inverted V-shaped roof and has a yellow colour scheme. It is mostly wheelchair accessible.

First announced in May 1982 as Bukit Batok South, it was later announced in October 1983 to be part of Phase IIB of the MRT system. It commenced operations on 10 March 1990. Initially under the Branch Line, it became part of the NSL in February 1996. Half-height platform screen doors and high-volume low-speed fans were installed by August 2011 and the first quarter of 2013, respectively.

== History ==
Bukit Batok station was first included in the early plans of the MRT system as Bukit Batok South in May 1982. It was later announced in October 1983 by the Mass Rapid Transit Corporation (MRTC) to be part of Phase IIB of the initial system, which included a stretch from Jurong Town to Bukit Panjang.

By August 1985, the MRTC prequalified 14 out of 42 tenderers for Contract 405, which outlined the construction of Bukit Batok, Bukit Gombak, and Bukit Panjang stations as well as the 6 kilometres (3.7 mi) track from Jurong to Bukit Panjang. In January 1986 it was announced that a joint venture between Taiwanese company RSEA International and local company Hock Lian Seng Engineering Pte Ltd to build the Jurong-Bukit Panjang stretch, also known as the western branch line. The subcontract for the supply of post-tension cables and pre-cast beams for the viaducts was awarded to Swiss-Singaporean company VSL Systems in July 1986.

By March 1989, a parliamentary question session revealed that the western branch line will start operating by the middle of next year, though in February 1990, it was announced by then-Minister for Communication and Information Yeo Ning Hong that the western branch line will start operating on 10 March. An open house was to be held on 4 March to allow residents to familiarise themselves with the Branch Line stations' layout. Bukit Batok, along with other stations in the Branch Line, opened on 10 March 1990.

In July 1993, it was announced that as part of the first phase for a programme to improve facilities for public transport, two clay-tiled sheltered walkways leading to Bukit Batok station would be installed, along with two other walkways in Choa Chu Kang and Khatib. On 10 February 1996, Bukit Batok along with other stations in the Branch Line were merged into the North–South Line (NSL) with the Woodlands extension. Following a rise in track intrusions as well as commuters slipping when rushing for the train, the Land Transport Authority (LTA) and SMRT decided to install platform screen doors. Half-height platform screen doors were eventually installed and commenced operations at Bukit Batok station by August 2011. The station was installed with high-volume low-speed fans by the first quarter of 2013.

== Details ==
Bukit Batok station is on the NSL with the station number of NS2, situated between Jurong East and Bukit Gombak. When it opened, it had the station number of B1 when it was on the Branch line before being changed to its current station code in August 2001 as a part of a system-wide campaign to cater to the expanding MRT System. As a part of the NSL, the station is operated by SMRT. Like many stations on the initial MRT network, Bukit Batok has an island platform and is elevated. The station operates between 5:45 am and 1:00 am daily, with train frequencies varying from 2–5 minutes during peak hours to an average of 5 minutes for off-peak hours. It is wheelchair-accessible (except for Exit A) and has bicycle facilities.

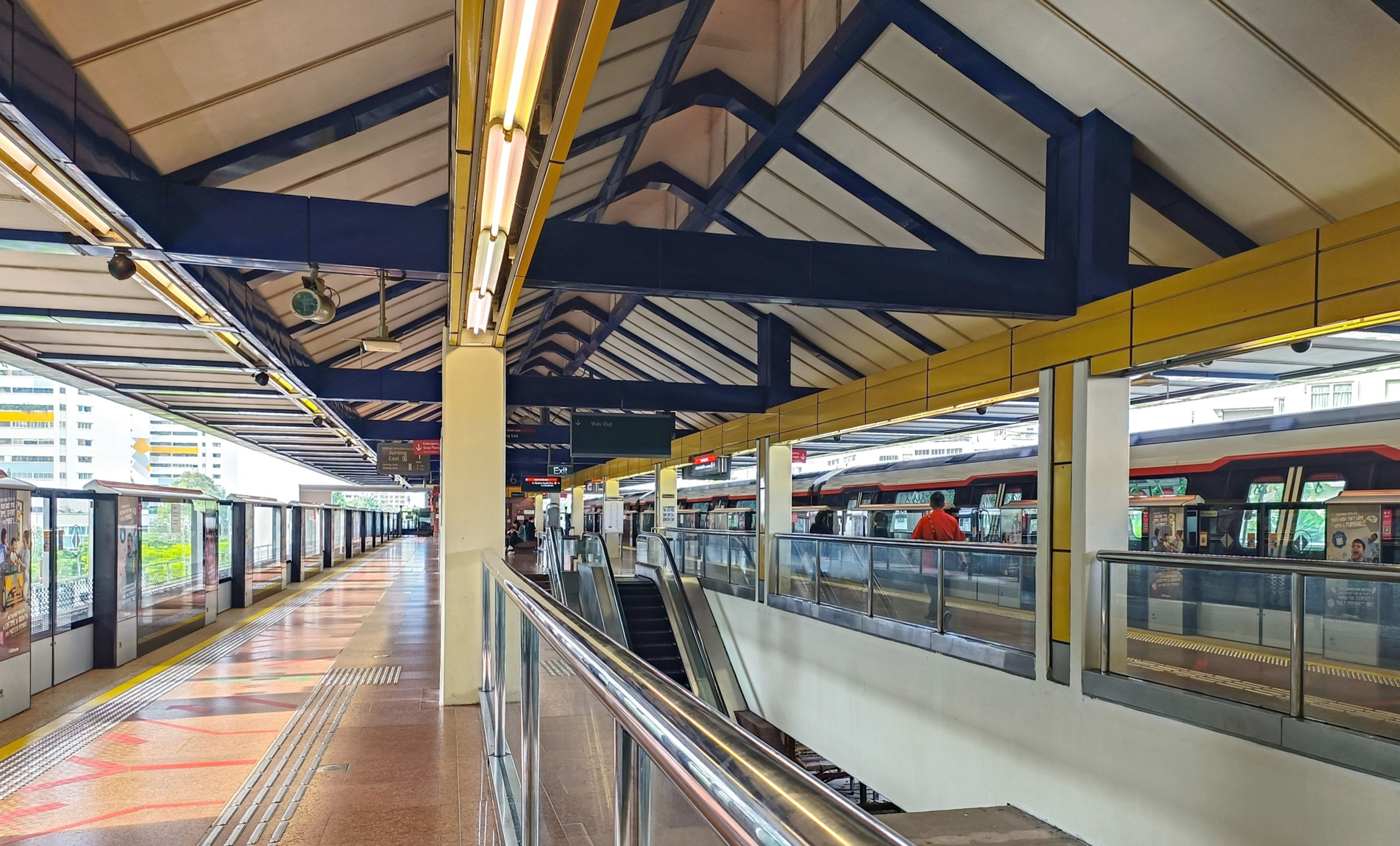
Platform level of Bukit Batok station

Bukit Batok station is located in the town of Bukit Batok, Singapore. It is near Bukit Batok Central and Bukit Batok Avenue and has four exits serving various landmarks such as the Bukit Batok Bus Interchange, West Mall (with Bukit Batok Library), Bukit Batok Community Club, HDB Bukit Batok Branch, and Civil Service Club @ Bukit Batok. Like other stations in the former Branch Line as well as in Khatib and Yishun, it has an inverted, high-pitched V-shaped roof, reminiscent of the Housing and Development Board (HDB) Logo as it is nestled in a HDB estate, as well as having brick walls in its exterior similar to the HDB blocks nearby. Bukit Batok has a yellow colour scheme to distinguish itself from other former Branch line stations.
