= West Mall =

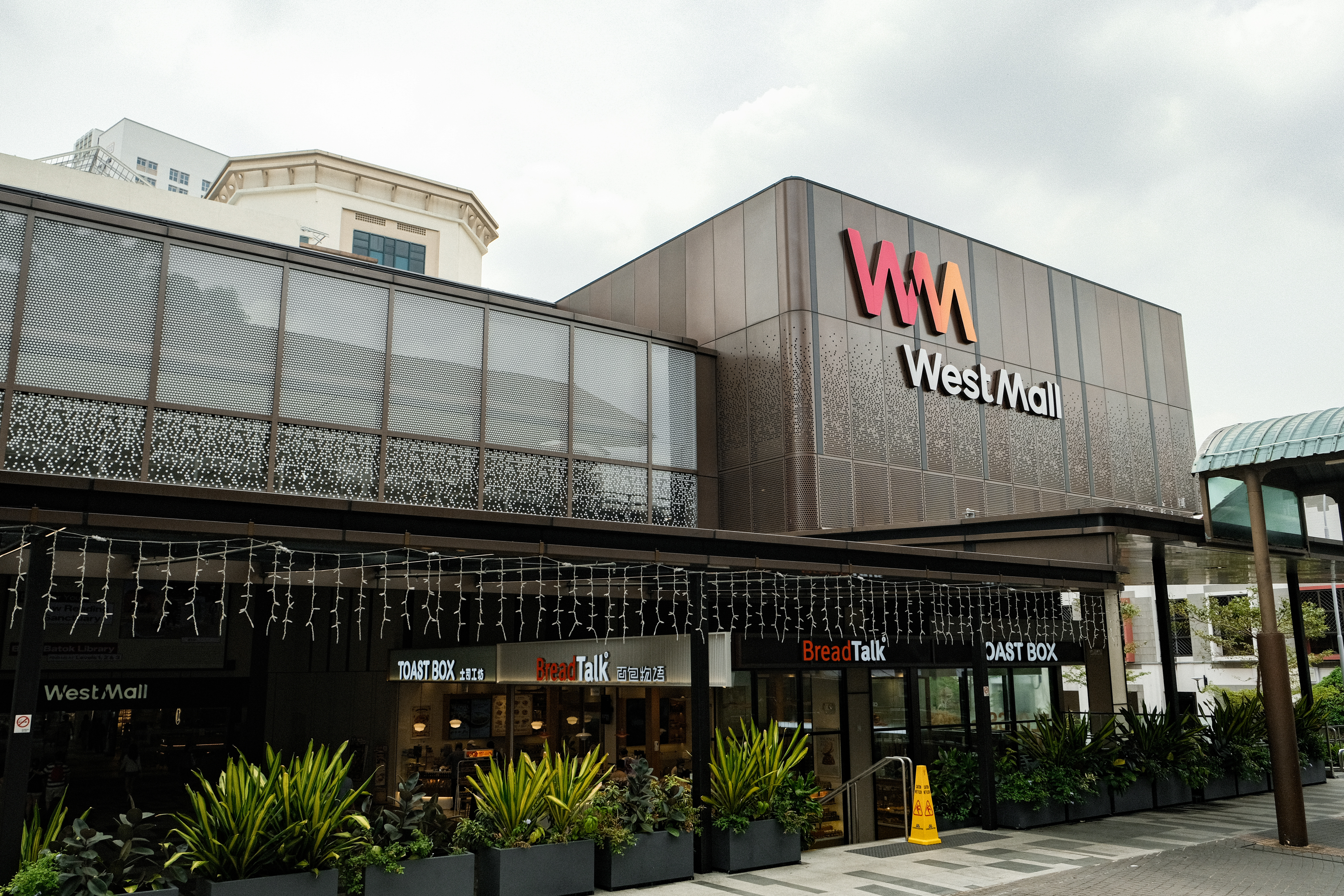
- Location: Bukit Batok, Singapore
- Coordinates: 1°20′59.98″N 103°44′56.60″E
- Address: 1 Bukit Batok Central Link, Singapore 658713
- Opened: 1998; 28 years ago
- Owner: Singapore Land Group
- Num. of stores: 156
- Num. of anchor tenants: 4
- Floor area: 204,900 square feet (19,040 m^{2})
- Floors: 8
- Parking: 219
- Public transit: NS2 Bukit Batok
- Website: www.westmall.com.sg

West Mall (Chinese: 威城; pinyin: Wēi Chéng) is a shopping centre located in Bukit Batok, Singapore, next to Bukit Batok MRT station.

== Background ==
West Mall was opened in 1998. It consists of eight storeys, for a total gross floor area of 204,900 square feet (19,040 m^{2}), and sitting on a land area of 106,000 square feet (9,800 m^{2}). West Mall houses a mix of retailers, such as fashion and accessory vendors, jewellery retailers, gifts and specialty stores, telcos, cafes and restaurants, a food court, a post office, a community library, a music school, electrical and household stores and a supermarket. The mall also has a carpark occupying two basement levels.

In February 2025, Cathay Cineplexes closed its cinema in West Mall, citing the expiry of its lease, and with mutual consent with the landlord.

=== Renovation ===
West Mall underwent renovation works starting from the first half of 2023, aimed at revitalising its offerings to create a more community-centric and vibrant retail destination. The first enhancement, a new plaza for events and gatherings, was completed in June 2025, providing the mall sheltered access from Bukit Batok MRT Station. 22,000 sq ft of basement carpark space was also converted into retail space, featuring more than 20 new food and beverage and retail shops in Basement 1. The Bukit Batok Library was also revamped and doubled in size, reopening in March 2026.
