= Swiss Cottage Secondary School =

Government school in Singapore

Coordinates: 1.3649°N 103.7507°E

- 瑞士村中学

Location
- 3 Bukit Batok Street 34, Singapore 659322

Information
- Type: Government; Co-Educational
- Motto: Scientiae Patriaeque Gratia (For the sake of learning and for the state)
- Founded: 7 November 1963; 62 years ago
- Founder: R. D. Jansen
- Session: Single
- School code: 3304
- Principal: Cheng Mun Yi Mandy
- Enrolment: approx - 1300
- Colour: Turquoise White
- Website: www.swisscottagesec.moe.edu.sg

Swiss Cottage Secondary School (SCSS) is a co-educational government secondary school in Bukit Batok, Singapore. Founded in 1963, it offers secondary education leading to the Singapore-Cambridge GCE Ordinary Level or Singapore-Cambridge GCE Normal Level examinations.

== History ==
=== Founding ===
SCSS started in 1962 with about 200 pupils, housed at Raffles Institution at Bras Basah Road as the school building along Dunearn Road was still under construction. In July 1963, students and staff moved into a new school premises at Swiss Cottage Estate (along Dunearn Road), which officially opened in November 1963, with an enrolment of about 870 pupils in two mediums, namely English and Malay. In 1966, Minister for Law and National Development Edmund W. Barker described SCSS as one of the foremost integrated schools in Singapore.

=== Relocation ===
In 1991, SCSS relocated from Dunearn Road to its current Bukit Batok campus. In 1997, SCSS was ranked 19 among all secondary schools in Singapore.

== Identity and culture ==
=== School crest ===
The crest is headed by five stars, which symbolise equality, peace, progress, justice and democracy. Below, there is a torch which signifies the light of knowledge and the love of learning. Encompassing it are the five rings symbolising sports and the part they play to link persons together. The five horizontal bands denote the five houses as rivals in competition but steadfast in fraternity.

=== Uniform ===
SCSS's uniform consists of a white collared shirt with an embroidered crest and long white trousers for all male students, and a white blouse with an embroidered crest and turquoise-blue four-pleated skirt for female students.

For official functions, students representing the school would wear a turquoise blazer, with a white long-sleeved shirt with long white trousers for males, and a long-sleeved blouse with a pleated white skirt for females. A turquoise tie is worn and formal dress shoes are worn for males, and court shoes for females.

== Academic information ==
Swiss Cottage Secondary offers three academics streams, the four-year Express Stream, Normal (Academic) Stream, and the Normal (Technical) Stream. The Express stream leads to the Singapore-Cambridge GCE Ordinary Level examinations, while the Normal (Academic & Technical) streams leads to the Singapore-Cambridge GCE Normal Level examinations.

=== Full Subject-Based Banding ===
SCSS is one of the 28 secondary schools selected by the Ministry of Education to start piloting aspects of Full Subject-Based Banding (SBB) from 2020 onwards. With Full SBB, the school is moving towards one secondary education, with many subject bands, to better meet students’ learning needs, without labels. This is part of the broader shift in the education system to recognise the strengths and interests of students, to help them build their confidence and develop an intrinsic motivation to learn for life in them.

=== Admissions ===
Students are enrolled through the Direct School Admission (DSA) or the Joint Admissions Exercise (JAE). SCSS's cut-off point for the Express Stream has consistently been within the 235-240 range, making it one of the top 40 secondary schools in Singapore. SCSS does not have affiliations with other schools or institutions.

== Co-curricular activities ==
SCSS offers 18 co-curricular activities (CCAs). These CCAs include uniformed groups, sports, performing arts, and clubs and societies.

The school is notable for its military band, the Singapore National Cadet Corps (NCC) Command Band. The Command Band primarily provides musical support in HQ NCC's military functions, in addition to other uniformed services, such as the Singapore Armed Forces and Singapore Civil Defence Force. In the local band scene, the Command Band has consistently achieved Certificates of Distinction in the Singapore Youth Festival, and has been a part of the National Day Parade’s Parade and Ceremony Combined Band since 2010.

The school is also well-known for its floorball team which has achieved National 1st Runner Up in Schools Championship 'C' Division Girls in 2018. And, more recently, its achievements in obtaining Gold in the National School Games 'B' and 'C' Division Girls in 2022.

The school's Uniformed Groups are also particularly notable, with the National Cadet Corps (Air) achieving Gold in the Best Unit Competition in 2017, Girl Guides achieving the Puan Noor Aishah Gold Award, Scouts achieving the Frank Coopers Sand Gold Award in 2017, and St. John's Brigade achieving Corps Achievement Gold Award.

List of co-curricular activities
Sports	Uniformed Groups	Performing Arts	Clubs & Societies
Badminton (Girls); Basketball (Boys); Basketball (Girls); Floorball (Boys); Floorball (Girls); Soccer (Boys); Tenpin Bowling (Boys)	Boys’ Brigade; National Cadet Corps (Air); National Police Cadet Corps (Boys); Scouts; National Civil Defence Cadet Corps	Chinese Orchestra; Show Choir; Swiss Dance; Swiss Drama; Singapore National Cadet Corps Command Band	Publications and Media Club (PMC); Science and Technology (SNT)
