= Cashew MRT station =

Mass Rapid Transit station in Singapore

Cashew DT2 凯秀 கேஷ்யூ
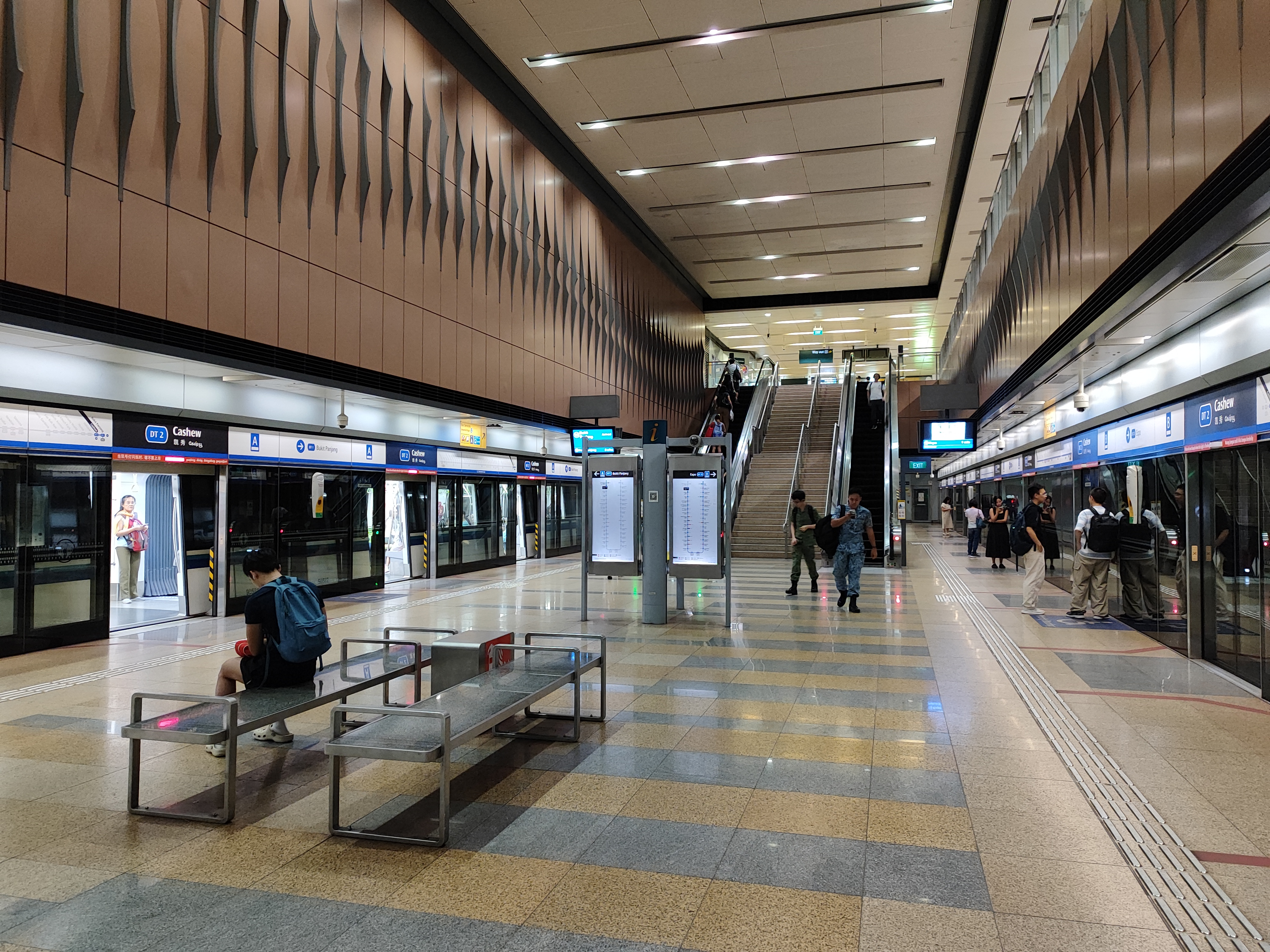
- Platform level of Cashew station

General information
- Location: 1 Cashew Road, Singapore 679696
- Coordinates: 01°22′08″N 103°45′53″E
- System: Mass Rapid Transit (MRT) station
- Owner: Land Transport Authority
- Operator: SBS Transit
- Line: Downtown Line
- Platforms: 2 (1 island platform)
- Tracks: 2
- Connections: Bus, Taxi

Construction
- Structure type: Underground
- Platform levels: 1
- Accessible: Yes

Other information
- Station code: CSW

History
- Opened: 27 December 2015; 10 years ago
- Former names: Chestnut, Hazel Park

Passengers
- June 2024: 2,491 per day

Services
Preceding station	Mass Rapid Transit	Following station
Bukit Panjang Terminus	Downtown Line	Hillview towards Expo
Track layout
Location
- Location within Singapore Rail

Cashew MRT station is an underground Mass Rapid Transit (MRT) station on the Downtown Line in Singapore, located between Upper Bukit Timah Road and Cashew Road. It is the nearest MRT station to the headquarters of the Ministry of Defence, as well as the CMPB.

== History ==
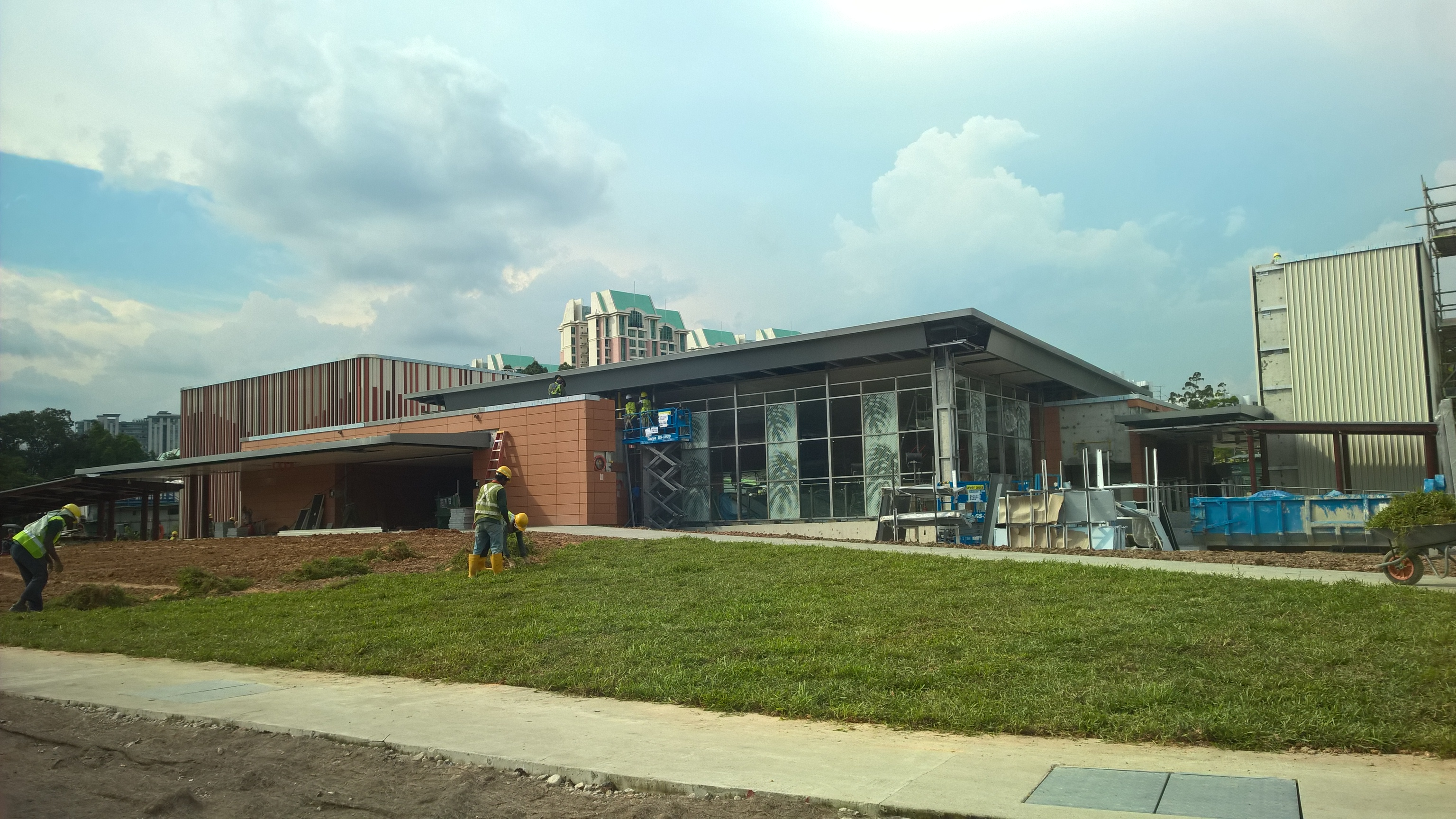
Cashew MRT station exit under construction

The station was first announced in July 2008 when the DTL2 stations were announced. Contract 913 for this station, Hillview and associated tunnels was awarded to GS Engineering & Construction Corp at S$431 million (U$297 million). The station was opened on 27 December 2015 as part of the Downtown Line Stage 2, with free travel on the Downtown Line until 1 January 2016.

== Details ==
This station is located between Upper Bukit Timah Road and Cashew Road, located nearby Assumption English School, Saint Joseph’s Church (Bukit Timah), and the upcoming NS Hub. It serves residents of many old and new condominiums such as Hazel Park condo and The Myst. Its station code is "DT2".

=== Artwork ===
Project Eden by Donna Ong is a collage themed about Singapore’s vision as a “garden city” that pays homage to the island's creative high-rise gardeners by metamorphosing everyday items into "flowers" and "grasses" of picturesque gardens.
