= Bukit Batok Town Park =

Nature park in Bukit Batok, Singapore

Coordinates: 1.355912°N 103.754880°E

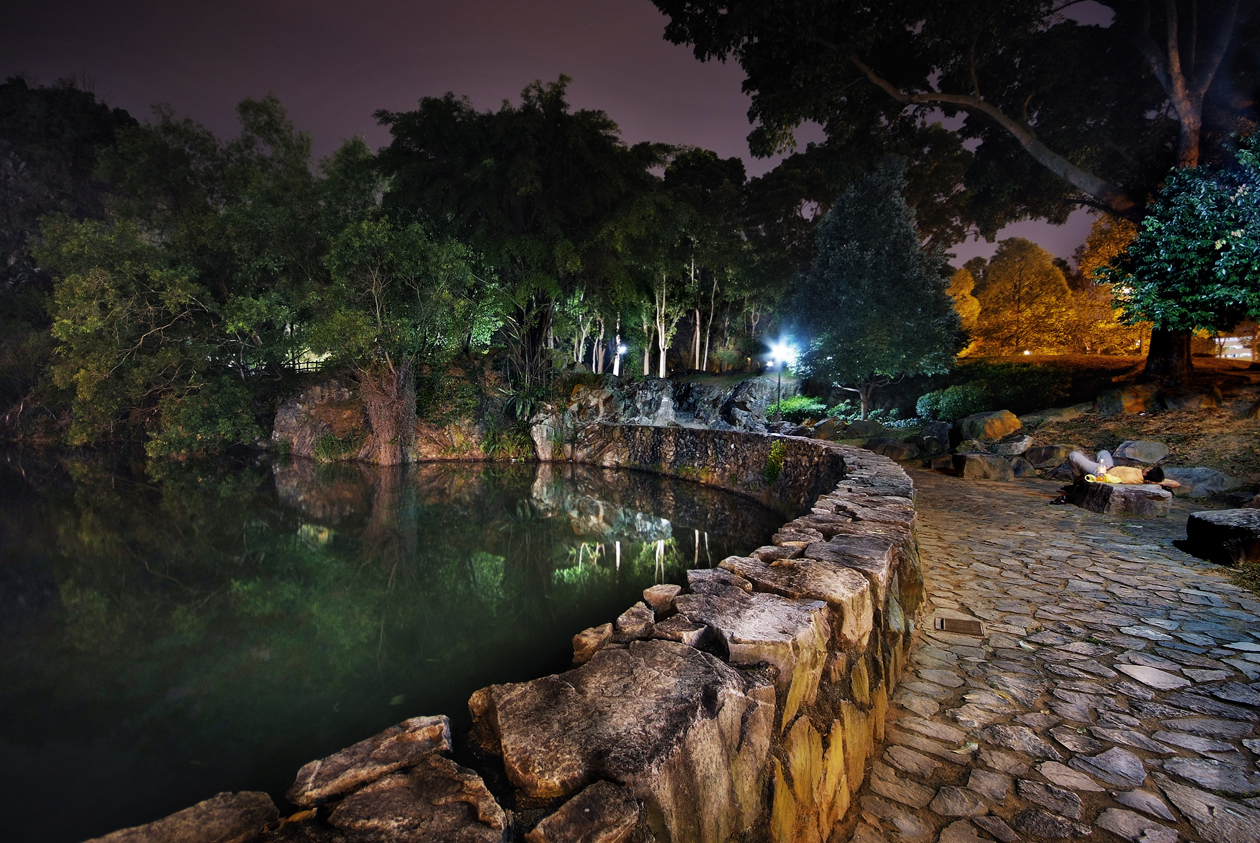
- At Bukit Batok Town Park

- Location within Singapore
- Location: Bukit Batok East Avenue 5, Singapore
- Nearest city: Bukit Gombak
- Area: 42 hectares (100 acres)
- Established: 1984
- Status: Opened

Bukit Batok Town Park is a nature park located in the precinct of Guilin in the town of Bukit Batok, Singapore. The park was created from a disused granite quarry. As such, it has a resemblance to the granite rock formations in Guilin, China. Hence it is also known as Little Guilin or Xiao Guilin (Chinese: 小桂林) among the Chinese.

== History ==
Together with the neighbouring Bukit Batok Nature Park, Bukit Batok Town Park occupies 42 hectares of land in Bukit Batok planning area, which covers the subzones Bukit Gombak, Hong Kah, Brickworks and Hillview. The park was a granite quarry formerly known as Gammon Quarry, and was the site for the extraction of Gombak norite, a norite unique to the area. The name of the area, Bukit Batok, which means "coughing hills", was derived from the sounds of quarrying activities.

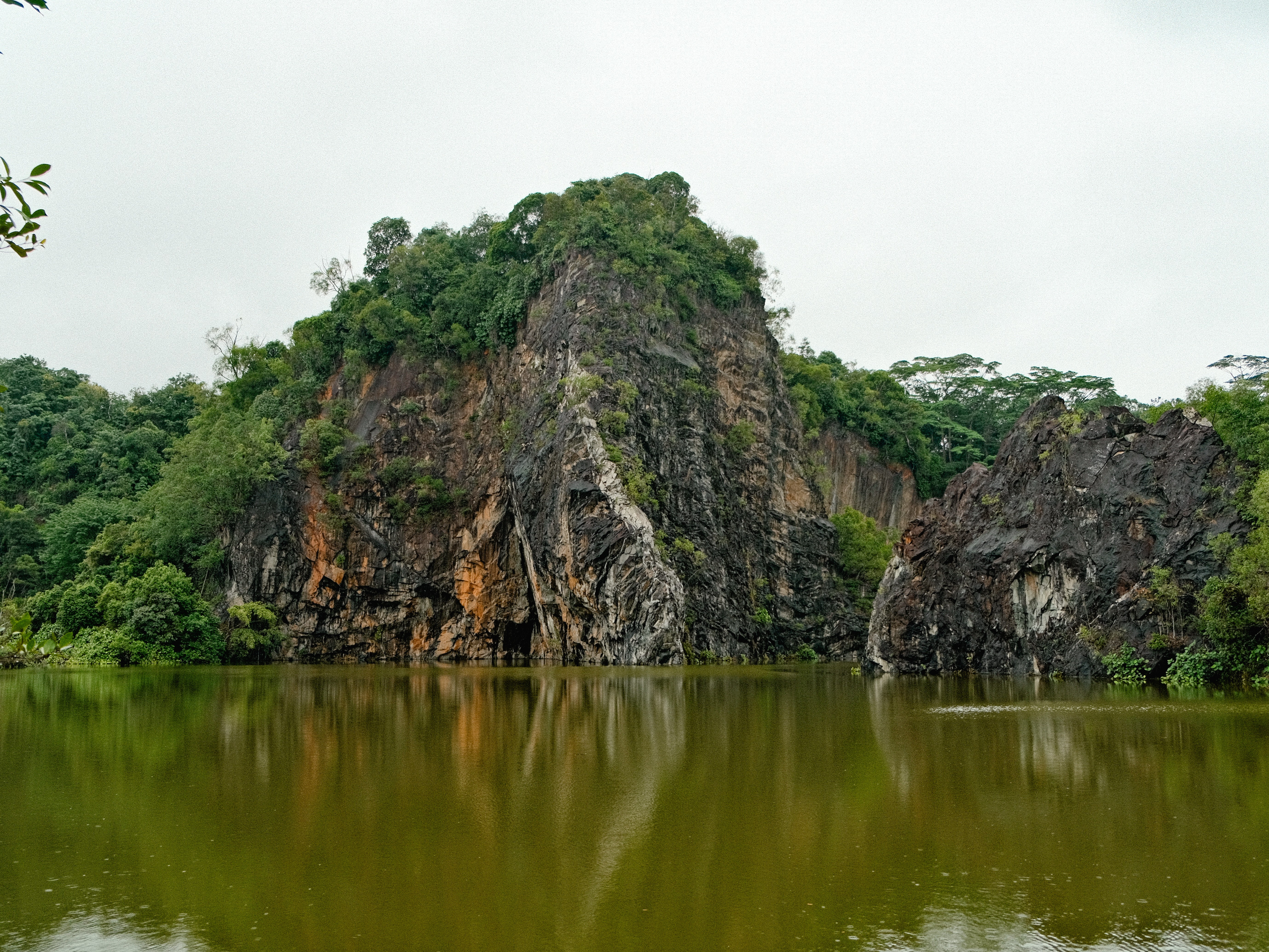
The Little Guilin is located within Bukit Batok Town Park

When the extraction of granite below sea level began to pose a threat to the local ecology, the government decided to close down the quarries in Bukit Batok and began sourcing granite from Indonesia instead. As a result, the quarry was abandoned and was gradually filled with rainwater over time, turning into a mini lake. In 1984, the Housing and Development Board (HDB) planned to fill up the quarry and build a road over it. However, upon seeing the rugged granite outcrops and a contrasting backdrop of green hills, which created a scenic and pleasant view, the HDB decided to convert the quarry into a park instead. They beautified the surroundings and improved accessibility by adding granite blocks to the retaining walls, as well as footpaths, lighting and seating.

The park came to be known as "Little Guilin" or "Xiao Guilin" in the early 1980s. When a SPH press photographer by the name of Christopher Low Ah Ang took a picture of the area while on assignment to find interesting places in Singapore. He named it 'Xiao Guilin' because the granite formations resemble the mountains in Guilin in China's Guangxi Province. The picture ran in the papers with the name in the caption and it has remained ever since.

In 1996, the Urban Redevelopment Authority linked the Town Park and Nature Parks via park connectors to the Bukit Timah Nature Reserve and Sungei Pandan to enhance the residential landscape for the area around Yishun and Bukit Batok.

The park is located in Bukit Gombak along Bukit Batok East Avenue 5. Besides being used for exercise and walks, the park has also been used as a stage for Chinese opera, dance and music performances. The park has also been suggested as an alternative destination for tourists wishing to see a different side of Singapore.

Urban legends in Singapore say that the park is haunted by the spirits of those who died in accidents while working at the quarry or drowned in the lake.

== Construction ==
The 42-hectare park has two dome-shaped shelters for protection against sun or rain.

This park is divided into three sections:

- The left section (as viewed from Bukit Batok East Ave 5) is a bank to the lake and comprises trees, grassy plains and stone seats. This section once had a nature trail within the trees behind the lake, but it is now closed off.
- The middle section contains a shelter with stone benches and several additional stone seats.
- The right section is similar to the middle section with a similar shelter and stone seats. A bus stop is located right next to this section of the park.

The middle and right sections are located directly behind Bukit Batok East Ave 5, and were built as retaining walls for the lake. The left section is not connected to the other two sections and is accessible from the roadside. The middle and right sections are connected by a small internal path and can also be accessed from the roadside.

This park is a favourite spot with photographers intending upon nature photography, anglers fishing in the lake, picnickers and joggers. The park has been designated with the code 9V-0006 by the international Parks On The Air award program, and so is regularly 'activated' by Amateur Radio operators using portable equipment.

=== Bukit Gombak Trail ===
Part of the Little Guilin Park, the Bukit Gombak Trail was created through the National Parks Board's Adopt-A-Park Scheme with the former Sembawang-Hong Kah Community Development Council and Bukit Gombak Community Club Youth Executive committee in 1999. It was a nature walk through the park, with directional signposts located at several points. According to the National Parks Board, these lookout points offered magnificent aerial perspectives of the lake and a bird's eye view of the surrounding estate. In 2007, following landslides, the National Parks Board permanently closed the trail.

== Getting there ==
The park is located a five-minute walk from Bukit Gombak MRT station. Alternatively, it can be accessed via feeder bus service 945 or trunk bus service 871, operated by Tower Transit Singapore.

== Gallery ==
View of Granite Rock and Lake in Bukit Batok Town Park

View of Lake in Bukit Batok Town Park

== See also ==
- List of Parks in Singapore
- Bukit Batok Nature Park
