= Bukit Batok Bus Interchange =

Bus interchange in Singapore

Bukit Batok Bus Interchange 武吉巴督巴士转换站 Pusat Pertukaran Bas Bukit Batok
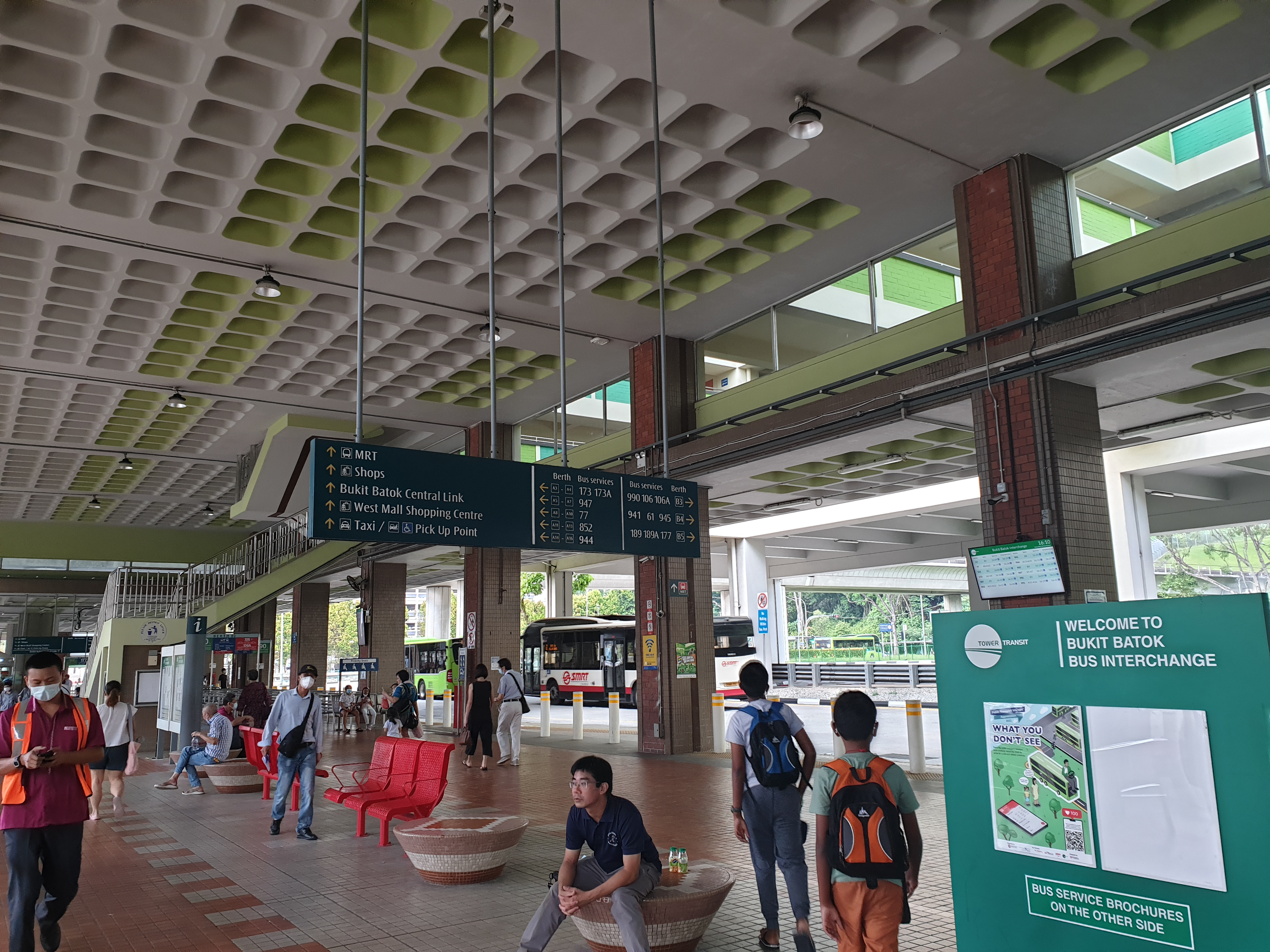
- Bukit Batok Bus Interchange interior

General information
- Location: 631 Bukit Batok Central, Singapore 650631
- System: Public Bus Interchange
- Owner: Land Transport Authority
- Operator: Tower Transit Singapore Pte Ltd (Transit Systems)
- Bus routes: 10 (Tower Transit); 2 (SMRT Buses); 1 (SBS Transit)
- Bus stands: 17 End-on; 3 Sawtooth; 2 Alighting
- Bus operators: Tower Transit Singapore Pte Ltd; SMRT Buses Ltd; SBS Transit Ltd
- Connections: NS2 Bukit Batok

Construction
- Structure type: At-grade
- Accessible: Accessible alighting/boarding points Accessible public toilets Graduated kerb edges Tactile guidance system

History
- Opened: 27 September 1987; 39 years ago

Key dates
- 27 September 1987: Commenced operations
Location

Bukit Batok Bus Interchange is an interchange bus station located at Block 631 Bukit Batok Central, Singapore, near West Mall and Bukit Batok MRT station. The sheltered concourse is built underneath a multi-storey carpark similar in design to Bishan Bus Interchange.

The interchange has two vehicular concourse areas, North and South. The North concourse features five sawtooth berths, two of which are used for alighting and the remaining three for boarding, with queuing lanes installed. Buses park at a bus park opposite the passenger concourse, and separate ingress and egress lanes lead to Bukit Batok Central.

The South concourse features fifteen end-on berths, which are shared among five bus services. Two end-on berths are reserved for wheelchair boarding and alighting. A combined ingress and egress lane cuts underneath the interchange and leads to a junction with Bukit Batok Central. Both concourses are able to accommodate double-deck buses. It is currently operated by Tower Transit Singapore, which operates 10 services under the Bulim Bus Package.

== History ==
The interchange was officially opened on 27 September 1987 and began operations two days later. It took over a terminal along Bukit Batok West Avenue 3.

In 1995, the bus package for all services (77, 173, 189, 361, 365, 367) was drawn under Bukit Batok Bus Package, and services were handed over between 18 June 2000 and 26 December 2000 from Singapore Bus Service to Trans-Island Bus Services which is now SMRT Buses. 61 was transferred from Paya Lebar Bus Package and 106 was transferred from Serangoon Bus Package in 2000.

In 2009, the Bukit Batok Bus Package was renamed to Bulim Bus Package. In 2016, Tower Transit Singapore took over services 77, 106, 173, 177, 189, 941, 945, 947, 990 from SMRT Buses and operates the interchange under the Bulim Bus Package; and service 61 was transferred away to Choa Chu Kang-Bukit Panjang Bus Package.

In 2018, SBS Transit took over service 852 from SMRT Buses under the Seletar Bus Package.

In 2021, Tower Transit Singapore took over service 944 (later renumbered to Service 992 and extended to loop at Tengah) from SMRT Buses under the Bulim Bus Package (2nd term).

== Accident ==
On 11 July 2021, 17 people were injured after two buses collided at the bus interchange causing a bus to crash through the fence and landed on its side 2m down to adjacent ramp at around 5:05 pm. The bus driver was arrested the following day for a rach act causing grievous hurt with investigations being done.

== Bus contracting model ==
Under the bus contracting model, all bus services operating from Bukit Batok Bus Interchange were divided into three bus packages, operated by three bus operators.

Bus service 944 was previously allocated to the Bulim bus package under SMRT Buses. Since 29 May 2021, service 944 (later renumbered to 992 and extended to loop at Tengah) has been operated by Tower Transit Singapore, after the Land Transport Authority awarded them the contract for the second term of the Bulim bus package in September 2020.

=== List of bus services ===
Operator	Package	Routes
SBS Transit	Seletar	852
SMRT Buses	Choa Chu Kang-Bukit Panjang	61, 991, 991A
Tower Transit Singapore	Bulim	77, 106, 106A, 173, 173A, 177, 189, 189A, 453, 941, 945, 947, 990, 992

== See also ==
- Bus transport in Singapore
