= List of Singapore MRT lines =

This is a list of Mass Rapid Transit (MRT) lines in Singapore, with details on costs, construction timelines and route length.

== North–South Line ==
Stage	Date		Length	Stretch			Stations			Cost
Stage	Commencement of construction	Service commencement	Length	Names	Codes		Elevated	At-grade	Underground	Cost
Stage	Commencement of construction	Service commencement	Length	Names	Contemporary	Retired	Elevated	At-grade	Underground	Cost
Phase 1	22 October 1983; 43 years ago	7 November 1987; 38 years ago	6 km	Yio Chu Kang - Toa Payoh	NS15 - NS19	N10 - N6	2 (40%)	1 (20%)	2 (40%)	S$5 billion (Note: Total cost of Phase 1 and 2 of the North–South Line and East–West Line.)
Phase 1	22 October 1983; 43 years ago	12 December 1987; 38 years ago	7	Toa Payoh - Raffles Place	NS19 - NS26	N6 - C1	—N/a	—N/a	7 (100%)	S$5 billion
Phase 2B	June 1985; 41 years ago	20 December 1988; 37 years ago	TBD	Yio Chu Kang - Yishun	NS15 - NS13	N10 - N12	2 (100%)	—N/a	—N/a	S$5 billion
Phase 2A	January 1985; 41 years ago	4 November 1989; 37 years ago	TBD	Raffles Place - Marina Bay	NS26 - NS27	C1 - M1	—N/a	—N/a	1 (100%)	S$5 billion
Phase 2B (Branch Line)	June 1985; 41 years ago	10 March 1990; 36 years ago	6.5 km	Jurong East - Choa Chu Kang	NS1 - NS4	W9 - B3; W9, N23 - N21	3 (100%)	—N/a	—N/a	S$5 billion
Woodlands Extension	TBD	10 February 1996; 30 years ago	16 km	Choa Chu Kang - Yishun	NS4 - NS13	N21 - N12	6 (100%)	—N/a	—N/a	S$1.2 billion
North–South Line Extension	December 2009; 16 years ago	23 November 2014; 11 years ago	1 km	Marina Bay - Marina South Pier	NS27 - NS28	—N/a	—N/a	—N/a	1 (100%)	S$357.5 million
Canberra station (infill)	26 March 2016; 10 years ago	2 November 2019; 7 years ago	—N/a	Canberra	NS12	—N/a	1 (100%)	—N/a	—N/a	S$274 million
Brickland station (infill)	H1 2026	2034; 8 years' time	—N/a	Brickland	NS3A	—N/a	1 (100%)	—N/a	—N/a	S$281 million
Sungei Kadut station (infill)	Q2 2026	2035; 9 years' time	—N/a	Sungei Kadut	NS6	—N/a	1 (100%)	—N/a	—N/a	TBD
Total			45 km	Jurong East - Marina South Pier	NS1 - NS28		17 (59%)	1 (3%)	11 (38%)	S$11.95 billion (Note: Total cost of the North–South Line and East–West Line.)
Total			45 km	Jurong East - Marina South Pier	NS1 - NS28		29 (100%)			S$11.95 billion

== East–West Line ==
Stage	Date		Length	Stretch			Stations		Cost
Stage	Commencement of construction	Service commencement	Length	Names	Codes		Elevated	Underground	Cost
Stage	Commencement of construction	Service commencement	Length	Names	Contemporary	Retired	Elevated	Underground	Cost
Phase 1	22 October 1983; 43 years ago	12 December 1987; 38 years ago	TBD	Raffles Place - Outram Park	EW14 - EW16	C1 - W2	—N/a	2 (100%)	S$5 billion
Phase 1A	January 1984; 42 years ago	12 March 1988; 38 years ago	TBD	Outram Park - Clementi	EW16 - EW23	W2 - W8	5 (83%)	1 (17%)	S$5 billion
Phase 2B	July 1984; 42 years ago	5 November 1988; 37 years ago	TBD	Clementi - Lakeside	EW23 - EW26	W8 - W11	3 (100%)	—N/a	S$5 billion
Phase 2A	January 1985; 41 years ago	4 November 1989; 37 years ago	TBD	City Hall - Tanah Merah	EW13 - EW4	C2 - E9	7 (78%)	2 (22%)	S$5 billion
Phase 2A	June 1985; 41 years ago	16 December 1989; 36 years ago	TBD	Tanah Merah - Pasir Ris	EW4 - EW1	E9 - E12	3 (100%)	—N/a	S$5 billion
Phase 2B	January 1988; 38 years ago	6 July 1990; 36 years ago	TBD	Lakeside - Boon Lay	EW26 - EW27	W11 - W12	1 (100%)	—N/a	S$5 billion
Changi Airport Extension	TBD	10 January 2001; 25 years ago	TBD	Tanah Merah - Expo	CG - CG1	E9, E13	1 (100%)	—N/a	S$850 million
Changi Airport Extension	TBD	8 February 2002; 24 years ago	TBD	Expo - Changi Airport	CG1 - CG2	—N/a	—N/a	1 (100%)	S$850 million
Dover station (infill)	TBD	18 October 2001; 25 years ago	—N/a	Dover	EW22	—N/a	1 (100%)	—N/a	S$45 million
Boon Lay Extension	TBD	28 February 2009; 17 years ago	3.8 km	Boon Lay - Joo Koon	EW27 - EW29	—N/a	2 (100%)	—N/a	S$436 million
Tuas West Extension	TBD	18 June 2017; 9 years ago	7.5 km	Joo Koon - Tuas Link	EW29 - EW33	—N/a	4 (100%)	—N/a	S$3.5 billion
Total			56.7 km	Pasir Ris - Tuas Link; Tanah Merah - Changi Airport	EW1 - EW33; CG - CG2		27 (77%)	8 (23%)	S$11.95 billion
Total			56.7 km	Pasir Ris - Tuas Link; Tanah Merah - Changi Airport	EW1 - EW33; CG - CG2		35 (100%)		S$11.95 billion

== North East Line ==
Stage	Date		Length	Stretch		Stations	Cost
Stage	Commencement of construction	Service commencement	Length	Names	Codes	Stations	Cost
—N/a	25 November 1997; 28 years ago	20 June 2003; 23 years ago	20 km	HarbourFront - Punggol	NE1; NE3 - NE10; NE12 - NE14; NE16 - NE17	14	S$4.6 billion
Buangkok station	25 November 1997; 28 years ago	15 January 2006; 20 years ago	20 km	Buangkok	NE15	1	TBD
Woodleigh station	25 November 1997; 28 years ago	20 June 2011; 15 years ago	20 km	Woodleigh	NE11	1	TBD
North East Line Extension	TBD	10 December 2024; 22 months ago	1.6 km	Punggol - Punggol Coast	NE17 - NE18	1	S$79 million
Total			21.6 km	HarbourFront - Punggol Coast	NE1 - NE18	17	S$5.39 billion (Note: Not inclusive of Buangkok and Woodleigh stations.)

== Circle Line ==
Stage	Date		Length	Stretch			Stations	Cost
Stage	Commencement of construction	Service commencement	Length	Names	Codes		Stations	Cost
Stage	Commencement of construction	Service commencement	Length	Names	Contemporary	Retired	Stations	Cost
Stage 3	May 2003; 23 years ago	28 May 2009; 17 years ago	5.7 km	Bartley - Marymount	CC12 - CC16	—N/a	5	S$10 billion
Stage 2	5 September 2002; 24 years ago	17 April 2010; 16 years ago	5.5 km	Bartley - Mountbatten	CC12 - CC7	—N/a	5	S$10 billion
Stage 1	5 March 2002; 24 years ago	17 April 2010; 16 years ago	5.5 km	Mountbatten - Dhoby Ghaut	CC7 - CC1	—N/a	6	S$10 billion
Stage 4	January 2005; 21 years ago	8 October 2011; 15 years ago	9.8 km	Marymount - Kent Ridge	CC16 - CC17; CC19 - CC24	—N/a	7	S$10 billion
Stage 5	January 2005; 21 years ago	8 October 2011; 15 years ago	6.8 km	Kent Ridge - HarbourFront	CC24 - CC29	—N/a	5	S$10 billion
Circle Line Extension	November 2007; 19 years ago	14 January 2012; 14 years ago	2.4 km	Promenade - Marina Bay	CC4 - CC33	CC4 - CE2	2	S$811.4 million (Note: S$348.4 million for Marina Bay CCL station; $463 million for Bayfront CCL + DTL station.)
Stage 6	2017; 9 years ago	12 July 2026; 3 months ago	4.0 km	HarbourFront - Marina Bay	CC29 - CC33	CC29 - CE2	3	S$4.85 billion
Bukit Brown station (infill)	TBD	TBD	—N/a	Bukit Brown	CC18	—N/a	1	TBD
Total			39.7 km	Dhoby Ghaut - Bayfront	CC1 - CC34		34	S$15.67 billion (Note: The cost breakdown of Stages 1-5 is not available.)

== Downtown Line ==
Stage	Date		Length	Stretch		Stations	Cost
Stage	Commencement of construction	Service commencement	Length	Names	Codes	Stations	Cost
Stage 1	TBD	22 December 2013; 12 years ago	4.3 km	Bugis - Chinatown	DT14 - DT19	6	TBD
Stage 2	3 July 2009; 17 years ago	27 December 2015; 10 years ago	16.6 km	Bugis - Bukit Panjang	DT14 - DT5; DT3 - DT1	12	TBD
Stage 3	TBD	21 October 2017; 9 years ago	21.0 km	Chinatown - Expo	DT19 - DT35	16	TBD
Hume station (infill)	28 February 2021; 5 years ago	28 February 2025; 20 months ago	—N/a	Hume	DT4	1	S$259.5 million
Stage 3 Extension	21 July 2016; 10 years ago	26 December 2026; 51 days' time	2.2 km	Expo - Sungei Bedok	DT35 - DT37	2	TBD
Stage 2 Extension	Q2 2026	2035; 9 years' time	4.0 km	Bukit Panjang - Sungei Kadut	DT1 - DE2	2	S$1.26 billion
Total			48.1 km	Sungei Kadut - Sungei Bedok	DE2 - DT37	39	TBD

== Thomson–East Coast Line ==
Stage	Date		Length	Stretch			Stations		Cost
Stage	Commencement of construction	Service commencement	Length	Names	Codes		Elevated	Underground	Cost
Stage	Commencement of construction	Service commencement	Length	Names	Contemporary	Retired	Elevated	Underground	Cost
Stage 1	27 June 2014; 12 years ago	31 January 2020; 6 years ago	2.9 km	Woodlands North - Woodlands South	TE1 - TE3	—N/a	—N/a	3 (100%)	TBD
Stage 2	27 June 2014; 12 years ago	28 August 2021; 5 years ago	11.4 km	Woodlands South - Caldecott	TE3 - TE9	—N/a	—N/a	6 (100%)	TBD
Stage 3	27 June 2014; 12 years ago	13 November 2022; 3 years ago	13.5 km	Caldecott - Gardens by the Bay	TE9; TE11 - TE20; TE22	—N/a	—N/a	11 (100%)	TBD
Mount Pleasant station (infill)	27 June 2014; 12 years ago	TBD	13.5 km	Mount Pleasant	TE10	—N/a	—N/a	1 (100%)	TBD
Marina South station (infill)	27 June 2014; 12 years ago	TBD	13.5 km	Marina South	TE21	—N/a	—N/a	1 (100%)	TBD
Stage 4	21 July 2016; 10 years ago	23 June 2024; 2 years ago	10.1 km	Gardens by the Bay - Bayshore	TE22 - TE29	—N/a	—N/a	7 (100%)	TBD
Stage 5	21 July 2016; 10 years ago	26 December 2026; 51 days' time	2.5 km	Bayshore - Sungei Bedok	TE29 - TE31	—N/a	—N/a	2 (100%)	TBD
Founders' Memorial station (infill)	21 July 2016; 10 years ago	2028; 2 years' time	—N/a	Founders' Memorial	TE22A	—N/a	—N/a	1 (100%)	TBD
Thomson–East Coast Line Extension	TBD	mid-2030s	14.0 km	Sungei Bedok - Tanah Merah	TE31 - TE35	TE31 - CG	2 (50%)		TBD
Tagore station (infill)	TBD	TBD	—N/a	Tagore	TE4A	—N/a	—N/a	1 (100%)	TBD
Total			57 km	Woodlands North - Tanah Merah	TE1 - TE31		2 (5%)	35 (95%)	TBD
Total			57 km	Woodlands North - Tanah Merah	TE1 - TE31		37 (100%)		TBD

== Jurong Region Line ==
Stage	Date		Length	Stretch		Stations	Cost
Stage	Commencement of construction	Service commencement	Length	Names	Codes	Stations	Cost
Stage 1	13 January 2023; 3 years ago	mid-2028; 2 years' time	24 km	Choa Chu Kang - Boon Lay; Bahar Junction - Tawas	JS1 - JS8; JS7 - JW2	10	TBD
Stage 2	13 January 2023; 3 years ago	2028; 2 years' time	24 km	Tengah - Pandan Reservoir	JS3 - JE7	7	TBD
Stage 3	13 January 2023; 3 years ago	2029; 3 years' time	24 km	Boon Lay - Jurong Pier; Tawas - Peng Kang Hill	JS8 - JS12; JW2 - JW5	7	TBD
JS2A station (infill)	TBD	mid-2030s	—N/a	JS2A	JS2A	1	TBD
West Coast Extension Phase 1	TBD	late-2030s	TBD	Pandan Reservoir - West Coast	JE7 - JE?	TBD	TBD
West Coast Extension Phase 2	TBD	early-2040s	TBD	West Coast - Kent Ridge	JE? - JE?	TBD	TBD
Total			24 km	Choa Chu Kang - Jurong Pier; Tengah Plantation - Pandan Reservoir; Gek Poh - Peng Kang Hill	JS1 - JS12; JE1 - JE7; JW1 - JW5	27	TBD

== Cross Island Line ==
Stage	Date		Length	Stretch		Stations	Cost
Stage	Commencement of construction	Service commencement	Length	Names	Codes	Stations	Cost
Phase 1	18 January 2023; 3 years ago	2030; 4 years' time	29.0 km	Aviation Park - Bright Hill	CR2 - CR13	12	S$7.64 billion (Note: Refer to list of Cross Island Line stations for breakdown of cost of CRL.)
Punggol Extension	10 October 2023; 3 years ago	2032; 6 years' time	7.3 km	Pasir Ris - Punggol	CP1 - CP4	3	S$2.16 billion (Note: Excluding Pasir Ris station.)
Phase 2	7 July 2025; 15 months ago	2032; 6 years' time	15.0 km	Bright Hill - Jurong Lake District	CR13 - CR19	6	S$3.51 billion
Changi Airport extension	TBD	mid-2030s	5.8 km	Aviation Park - Changi Terminal 5	CR2 - CR1	1	TBD
Phase 3	2027	late-2030s	10.0 km	Jurong Lake District - Gul Circle	CR19 - CR23	4	TBD
Total			67 km	Changi Terminal 5 - Gul Circle; Pasir Ris - Punggol	CR1 - CR23; CP1 - CP4	26	S$13.31 billion (Note: Excluding Phase 3 and Changi T5 station.)

== See also ==
- List of Singapore MRT stations
- List of Singapore MRT and LRT rolling stock
