= KRG =

KRG may refer to:

- Kurdistan Regional Government, Iraq
- Kativik Regional Government, Canada
- Kent Ridge MRT station, Singapore (MRT station abbreviation)
- K. R. Gangadharan, Indian film producer
