= Hyundai Rotem J151 =

Class of electric multiple units in Singapore

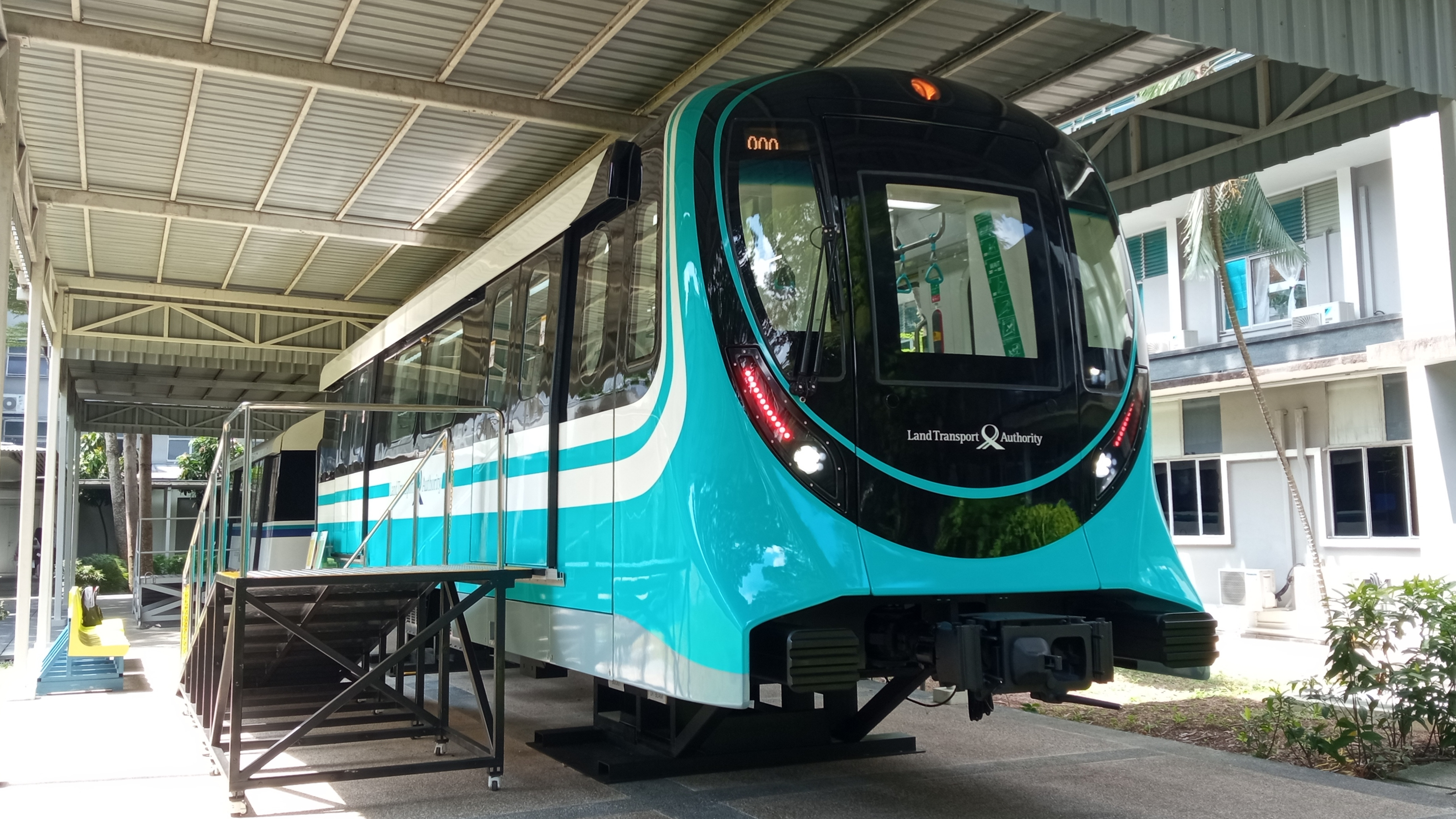
- Exterior mockup of the J151

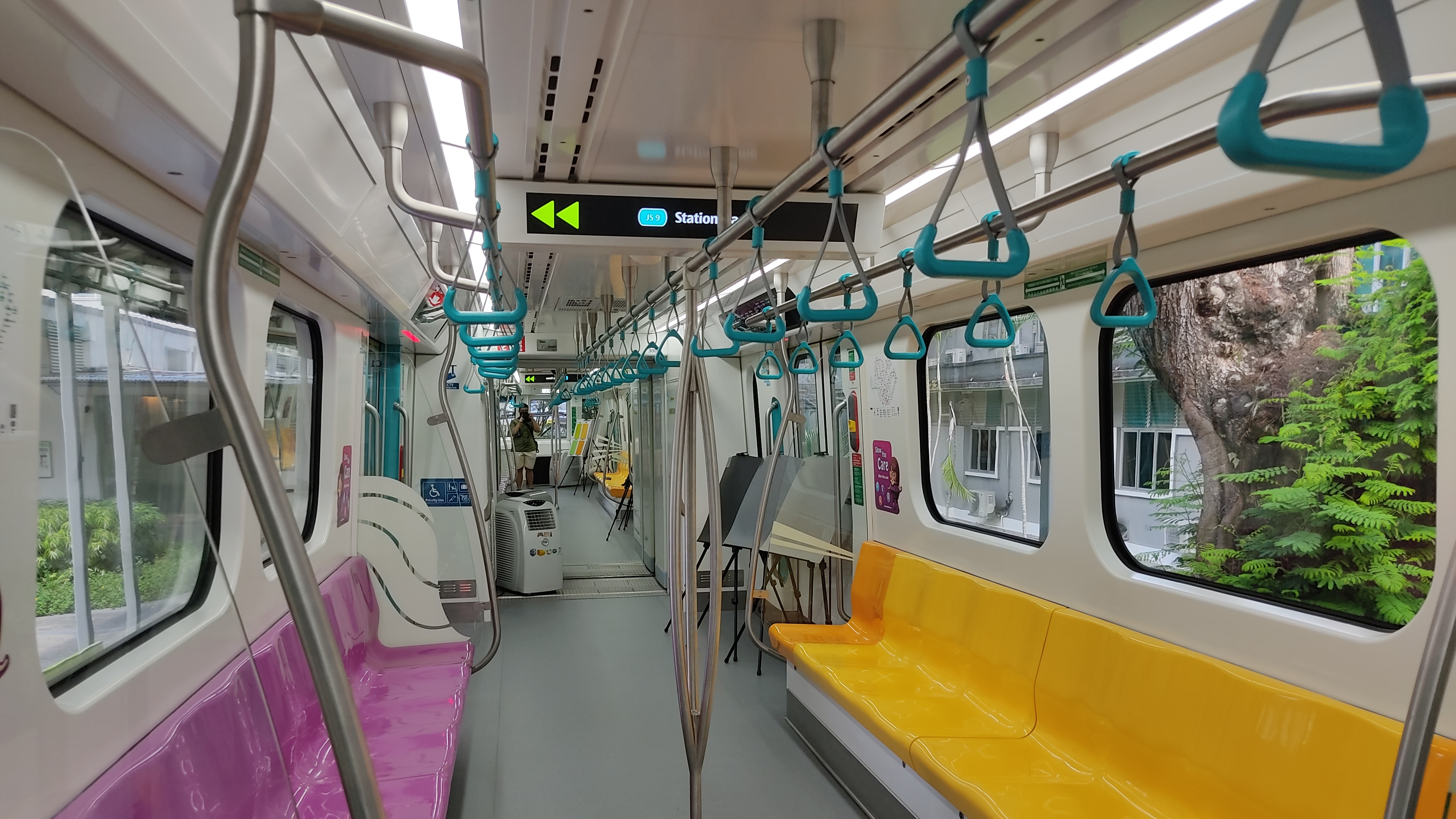
- Interior mockup of the J151.
- Stock type: Electric multiple unit
- In service: mid-2028; 2 years' time
- Manufacturer: Hyundai Rotem
- Designer: DIARADESIGN
- Built at: Changwon, South Korea
- Constructed: 2022–2026
- Entered service: mid-2028; 2 years' time
- Number under construction: 180 vehicles (60 sets)
- Number built: 6 vehicles (2 sets)
- Formation: 3/4 per trainset DM1–T–DM2
- Fleet numbers: 3001–3062
- Capacity: 450 passengers per 3-car train
- Operators: Singapore One Rail (ComfortDelGro's SBS Transit and RATP Dev Asia Pacific)
- Depot: Tengah
- Line served: Jurong Region Line

Specifications
- Car body construction: Welded aluminium
- Train length: 56.8 m (186 ft 4 1/4 in)
- Car length: 18.6 m (61 ft 1/4 in)
- Width: 2.75 m (9 ft 1/4 in)
- Height: 3.80 m (12 ft 5 5/8 in)
- Doors: 1,500 mm (59 in), 6 per car, 3 per side
- Maximum speed: 70 km/h (43 mph) (service)
- Weight: 94.6 t (94,600 kg)
- Electric systems: 750 V DC third rail
- Current collection: Collector shoe
- UIC classification: Bo′Bo′+2′2′+Bo′Bo′
- Safety systems: Siemens Trainguard Sirius moving block CBTC ATC under ATO GoA 4 (UTO), with subsystems of ATP, Controlguide Rail 9000 ATS and Trackguard Westrace MK2 CBI
- Coupling system: Dellner
- Track gauge: 1,435 mm (4 ft 8 1/2 in) standard gauge

The Hyundai Rotem J151 is the first generation electric multiple unit rolling stock to be introduced on the under-construction Jurong Region Line of Singapore's Mass Rapid Transit (MRT) system, manufactured by Hyundai Rotem under Contract J151. In 2020, the Land Transport Authority (LTA) purchased 62 three-car medium-capacity Hyundai Rotem trainsets (186 cars) for the Jurong Region Line, with the first trainset was delivered to Singapore on 17 September 2025, and the fleet is expected to enter service when the line opens in mid-2028.

== Tender ==
The tender for trains under the contract J151 was closed on 13 June 2019 with four bids. The LTA has shortlisted all of them and the results has been released.

| S/N | Name of Tenderer | Amount (S$) |
|---|---|---|
| 1 | Bombardier (Singapore) Pte Ltd | 546,619,188.80 |
| 2 | Kawasaki Heavy Industries, Ltd. / Kawasaki Heavy Industries(Singapore) Pte Ltd & CRRC Qingdao Sifang Consortium / Singapore CRRC Sifang Railway Vehicles Service Pte. Ltd. Consortium | 446,028,000.00 |
| 3 | Hyundai Rotem Company | 396,180,000.00 |
| 4 | Alstom Transport S.A. / Alstom Transport (S) Pte Ltd Consortium | 566,491,507.00 |

Note: Awarded amount to Hyundai Rotem Company as announced by LTA is at SGD 416,499,000.00

== Design ==
Every Jurong Region Line train will feature a livery that is mainly turquoise in color to reflect the line's color on the MRT map. The design features a sleek modern look, with angular LED headlights and taillights, similar to that of its C951(A) and R151 trains in Singapore and the R-Trains in Hong Kong.

The trains are also smaller in size compared to those on other MRT lines to enable them to navigate tighter curves in areas constrained by existing developments along the line.

== Features ==
The J151 train will have the following features that make it better than the other rolling stocks:

- Larger Door Closing Indicator – Provides better visibility on door opening/closing status.
- Wider train doors (1.5 metres (4 ft 11 in), compared to 1.45 metres (4 ft 9 in) on other rolling stocks) – Provides better accessibility for passengers during boarding/alighting.
- More space for multi-use – Provides greater convenience for passengers with strollers and foldable bicycles (other rolling stocks only have this kind of accommodation at selected cars, and somemore the provision is only half of what the J151 train will provide).
- Battery-powered emergency propulsion – Enables the train to drive to the nearest station for passenger evacuation in the event of a power outage. This is the first time a MRT rolling stock has this feature. While the earlier rolling stock also has emergency batteries, they are only capable of providing emergency ventilation and lighting for evacuation onto the tracks.

At the same time, the J151 trains will have the following features that are already found in other rolling stocks, namely:

- Condition monitoring and diagnostic systems – Monitors the train health and detect faults for better reliability. Some trains will also have an Automatic Track Inspection (ATI) system, consisting of cameras, lasers and sensors, to detect rail defects in real-time.
- LCD Dynamic Route Map Display – Provides key information such as system map, station arrival and train doors opening side.
- Perch seats, grab poles and hand grips – Provides better comfort for standing passengers.
- LCD Ceiling Display – Provides key information such as station arrival and train doors opening side.
- Ergonomic seats – Provides a more comfortable ride for seating passengers.

In addition, the manufacturer will also tap on existing suppliers of components and systems that are currently used on other rolling stock on the network, which allows for greater commonality between the rolling stock that streamlines maintenance.

== Train formation ==
The coupling configuration of a J151 in revenue service is DM1–T–DM2. D stands for "driver's desk", M for "motor" and T for "trailer".

The train cars are assigned a 5-digit serial number ranging from 3001x to 3062x, where x depends on the carriage type. A complete three-car trainset consists of one trailer (T) and two driving motor (DM) cars coupled together, e.g. set 3001 consists of carriages 30011, 30012, 30013.

- The first digit is always an 3.
- The second digit is always a 0.
- The third and fourth digits identify the set number.
- The fifth digit identifies the car number, where the first car has a 1, the second has a 2 and the third has a 3.
- Hyundai Rotem built sets 3001 – 3062.

The trains are able to be coupled into a 4-car train set if needed to increase train capacity.
