= Tengah Depot =

Future MRT and bus depot in Singapore

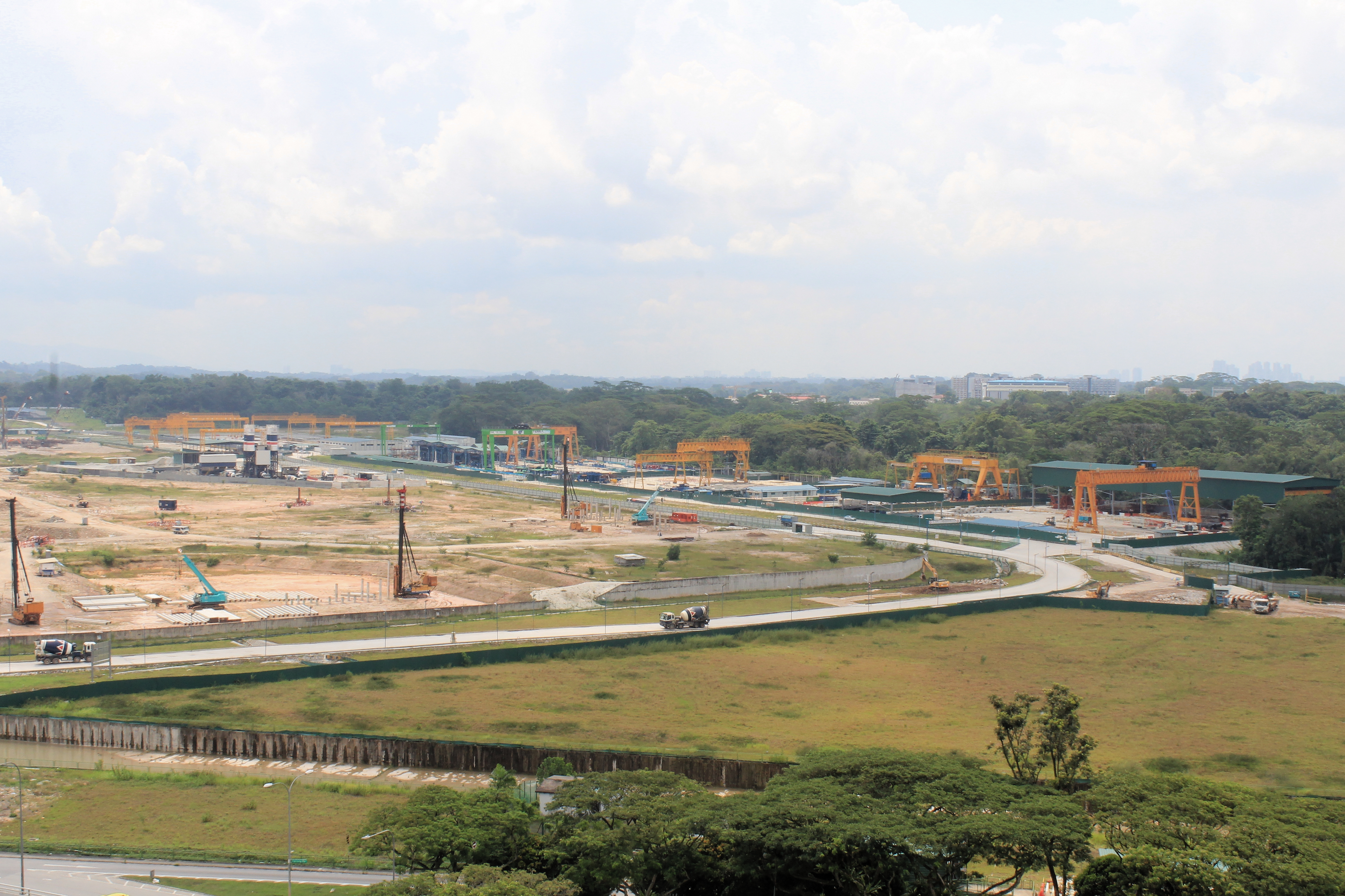
- Tengah Depot construction site in June 2022
- Interactive map of Tengah Depot

Location
- Location: 3 Tengah Close; Singapore 699859
- Coordinates: 1°21′52″N 103°42′42″E

Characteristics
- Owner: Land Transport Authority
- Operator: Singapore One Rail (SBS Transit and RATP Dev Asia Pacific)
- Type: At-Grade
- Roads: Tengah Way, Tengah Close (currently only accessible by construction vehicles)
- Rolling stock: Hyundai Rotem J151
- Routes served: JRL Jurong Region Line

History
- Opened: mid-2028; 2 years' time

Tengah Depot is a future integrated train and bus depot in Tengah, Singapore. At 44.5 ha (110 acres), the at-grade depot will house 100 trains of the Jurong Region Line (JRL) fleet and house 600 buses. The depot will be located along the line between the Hong Kah and Corporation stations. Other facilities of the depot include the Operations Control Centre (OCC) for the JRL. First announced in 2018, the depot is expected to be completed in mid-2028 along with the first stage of the JRL.

== History ==
On 9 May 2018, the Land Transport Authority (LTA) announced that a joint rail and bus depot in the Tengah area will serve the proposed Jurong Region Line (JRL). The depot was expected to be completed in 2026 along with Phase 1 of the JRL. However, the restrictions on construction due to the COVID-19 pandemic in Singapore has led to delays, with the completion date pushed by one year to 2027. Due to construction and testing delays, the completion date was further delayed by six months to mid-2028.

Contract J101 for the construction of Tengah Depot and its associated facilities was awarded to China Railway 11 Bureau Group Corporation (Singapore Branch) at S$739.5 million in November 2019. Construction will begin in 2020, with an expected completion in mid-2028.

== Design ==
The depot includes a rail administration building, stabling yards, test track, storage warehouses and maintenance workshops. The administrative building will house the Operation Control Centre (OCC) and Depot Control Centre (DCC) for the Jurong Region Line. The stabling yards have a capacity for 100 four-car trains, and stabling capacity supplemented by an additional stabling facility located off Peng Kang Hill Station.

The multi-storey bus depot will be co-located with the facility and will provide parking and maintenance facilities for about 600 buses. It will also house a Bus Operations Control Centre. Within the site will be a four-storey transport workers' dormitory which can accommodate 450 bus captains.
