= SBS Transit =

Public transport operator in Singapore

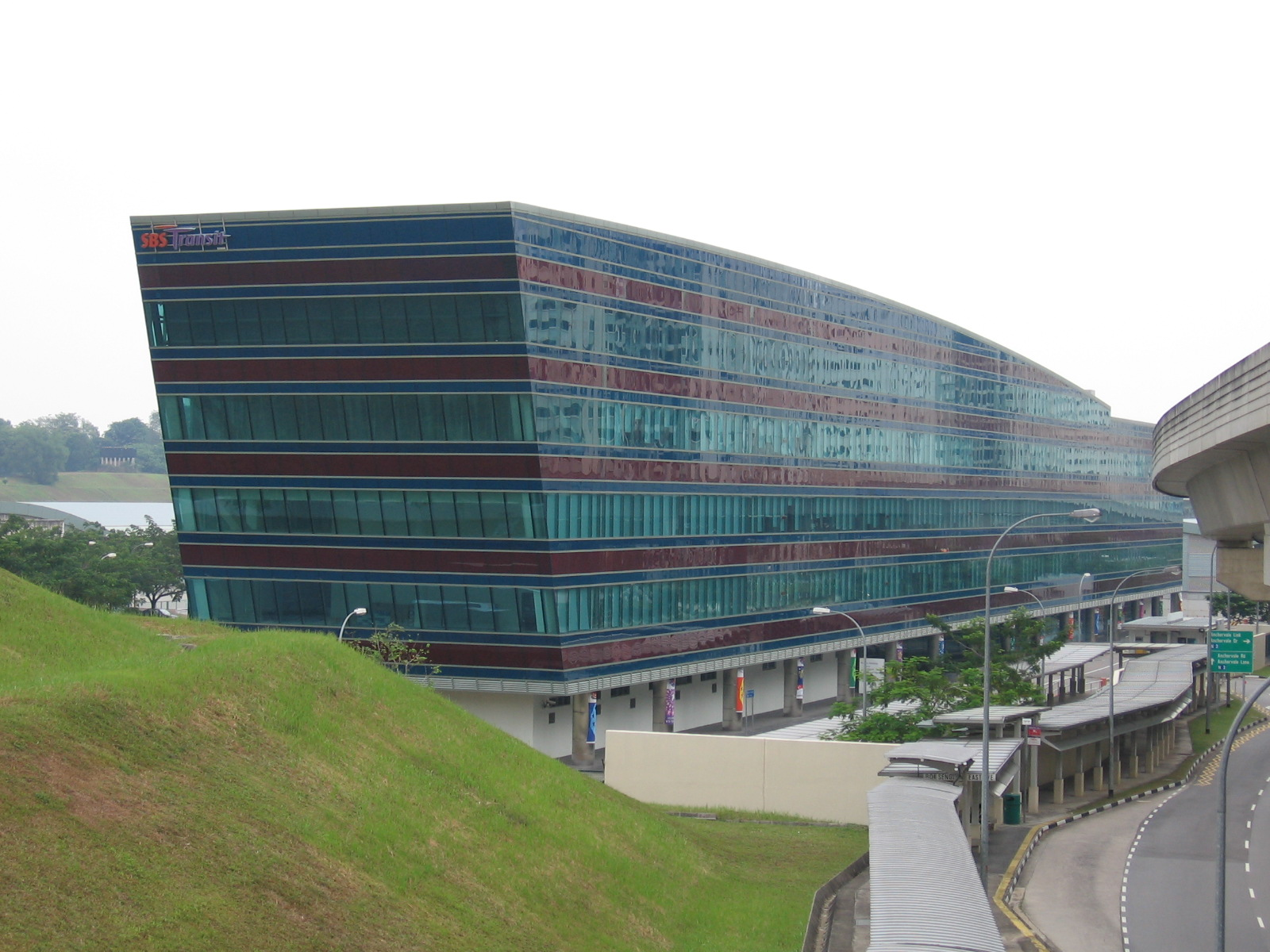
- One of SBS Transit's administration offices at Sengkang Depot
- Type: Public Subsidiary
- Traded as: SGX: S61
- Industry: Public transport
- Predecessor: Amalgamated Bus Company; Associated Bus Services; United Bus Company
- Founded: 1 July 1973; 53 years ago (as Singapore Bus Services); 1 November 2001; 25 years ago (as SBS Transit)
- Headquarters: 91 Sengkang E Ave, Singapore 545072
- Area served: Singapore
- Key people: Bob Tan Beng Hai (Chairperson); Jeffrey Sim (CEO)
- Services: Bus & rail services
- Revenue: ▲ S$1.19 billion (2017)
- Operating income: ▲ S$59.3 million (2017)
- Net income: ▲ S$47.1 million (2017)
- Number of employees: 10,239 (2017)
- Parent: ComfortDelGro (75.01%)
- Subsidiaries: SBS Transit Rail Pte Ltd; Singapore One Rail (75.01%)
- Website: www.sbstransit.com.sg

SBS Transit Ltd (abbreviation: SBS or SBST) is a multi-modal public transport operator in Singapore operating bus and rail services. With a majority of its shares owned by ComfortDelGro at 75%, it was formerly known as Singapore Bus Services before rebranding to SBS Transit on 1 November 2001.

It is the largest public bus operator in Singapore, as well as one of the two major operators of Singapore's rail services along with SMRT Corporation. It has a fleet of 3,329 buses and operates 196 routes, as of 2024.

== History ==
=== Singapore Bus Services (1973‍–‍2001) ===
==== 1973‍–‍1978 ====
Singapore Bus Services Limited was established on 1 July 1973 when the regional bus companies Amalgamated Bus Company, Associated Bus Services and United Bus Company (which were in turn results of amalgamations of privately run Chinese bus companies of the 1960s in 1971) agreed to merge their operations with each taking shareholdings of 53%, 19% and 28% respectively in the new company. The government-sanctioned merger was undertaken to improve service standards of the bus transport system.

SBS inherited many problems from its Chinese predecessors, including use of 14 non-standard bus models that frequently broke down, poor standards among the staff and inadequate infrastructure. Hence, the government seconded a Government Team of Officials to SBS in 1974 to overhaul the management and culture. Under the supervision of the GTO, SBS completely overhauled their bus fleet with new buses of usually the Albion Viking or Mercedes-Benz OF1413 makes and introduced a rigorous maintenance regime, improving the reliability of their buses greatly whereas a new disciplinary code was introduced, reducing complaints by half from 1979 to 1983.

In 1977, SBS introduced into service its first double-decker buses, the Leyland Atlantean AN68 on route 86 between Tampines Way and Shenton Way.

In light of dissatisfaction over bus services in the Jurong area and requests for improved coverage, SBS started a reorganisation of bus services across the country, starting with Jurong. This consisted of a network of internal services serving a town, with external services terminating at a point in the town, along with bus interchanges to serve as such termini. Additional depots were also constructed, which SBS claimed gave them more control over bus operations.

==== 1978‍–‍2001 ====
The company was replaced by the Singapore Bus Service (1978) Limited on 17 February 1978. In May 1978, the company implemented a rule that car owners were not allowed to purchase any shares, resulting in more than 5,000 applicants being unsuccessful. The stock was oversubscribed by about 27 times, with S$375 million received for 14 million shares at S$1.00 each. The company was listed on the Stock Exchange of Singapore (SES) on 26 June 1978.

In 1992, SBS were reorganised under a new subsidiary SBS Bus Services Pte Ltd. On 12 November 1997, the original Singapore Bus Services (1978) Limited was renamed DelGro Corporation, with SBS Bus Services Pte Ltd listed separately as Singapore Bus Services Limited on 10 December that year.

SBS also operated taxis as SBS Taxis. SBS Taxis merged with Singapore Commuter and Singapore Airport Bus Services on 1 July 1995 to form CityCab, which remained part of DelGro Corporation.

SBS also operated Airbus in the past from 1995 to 1997 and Premium Bus Services, Sentosa Services and Jurong Island Services called "SBS Leisure" in 1995 to 2003. SBS had transferred Sentosa and Jurong Island Services in 2003, and Premium Bus Services (555 and 556) in December 2003 to private bus operators. 555 was a bus service from Watten Estate to Spottiswoode Park and 556 was a bus service from Sunset Way to Shenton Way, but it was totally withdrawn on 31 October 2004.

=== Route handovers ===
Year	Bus Package	From	To	Reason
1983	Sembawang/Yishun/Woodlands	Singapore Bus Services	Trans-Island Bus Services	
1995	Bukit Panjang	Singapore Bus Services	Trans-Island Bus Services	Foster greater competition in the bus industry and to cushion the impact with the rationalisation of bus services caused by the opening of Woodlands MRT extension in 1996.
1995	Sengkang/Punggol	Singapore Bus Services	Trans-Island Bus Services	Foster greater competition in the bus industry and to cushion the impact with the rationalisation of bus services caused by the opening of Woodlands MRT extension in 1996.
1999	Choa Chu Kang	Singapore Bus Services	Trans-Island Bus Services	The tender to operate the North East Line, Sengkang and Punggol LRT, and several bus services in the Sengkang and Punggol are awarded to SBS. In addition, bus tenders for Choa Chu Kang and Bukit Batok bus services are awarded to TIBS. This move is also to cushion the impact with the rationalisation of bus services caused by Bukit Panjang LRT in 1999, as well as to reduce congestion in depots (Bus 61, 67, 106 and 172).
1999	Sengkang/Punggol	Trans-Island Bus Services	Singapore Bus Services	The tender to operate the North East Line, Sengkang and Punggol LRT, and several bus services in the Sengkang and Punggol are awarded to SBS. In addition, bus tenders for Choa Chu Kang and Bukit Batok bus services are awarded to TIBS. This move is also to cushion the impact with the rationalisation of bus services caused by Bukit Panjang LRT in 1999, as well as to reduce congestion in depots (Bus 61, 67, 106 and 172).
2000	Bukit Batok	Singapore Bus Services	Trans-Island Bus Services	The tender to operate the North East Line, Sengkang and Punggol LRT, and several bus services in the Sengkang and Punggol are awarded to SBS. In addition, bus tenders for Choa Chu Kang and Bukit Batok bus services are awarded to TIBS. This move is also to cushion the impact with the rationalisation of bus services caused by Bukit Panjang LRT in 1999, as well as to reduce congestion in depots (Bus 61, 67, 106 and 172).
2016	Bulim (Jurong East)	SBS Transit	Tower Transit Singapore	Under the Bus Contracting Model from 2016 onwards.
2016	Loyang (Punggol/Pasir Ris)	SBS Transit	Go-Ahead Singapore	Under the Bus Contracting Model from 2016 onwards.
2018	Seletar	SMRT Buses	SBS Transit	Under the Bus Contracting Model from 2016 onwards.
2024	Jurong West	SBS Transit	SMRT Buses	Under the Bus Contracting Model from 2016 onwards.
2026	Tampines	SBS Transit	Go-Ahead Singapore	Under the Bus Contracting Model from 2016 onwards.
2027	Serangoon-Eunos	SBS Transit	SMRT Buses	Under the Bus Contracting Model from 2016 onwards.

=== SBS Transit (2001–present) ===
On 1 November 2001, Singapore Bus Services was rebranded as SBS Transit to reflect it becoming a multi-modal transport operator with the impending opening of the Sengkang LRT line and North East MRT line. Refurbishment of the buses began on 1 November 2001 and completed on 14 February 2004.

On 29 March 2003, DelGro Corporation merged with Comfort Group to form ComfortDelGro. ComfortDelGro Corporation owns 75% of the shares in SBS Transit.

On 18 January 2003, SBS Transit commenced operating the Sengkang LRT, followed by the North East MRT line on 20 June the same year. SBS Transit commenced operating the Punggol LRT on 29 January 2005, followed by the Downtown MRT line on 22 December 2013.

== Bus ==
=== Routes ===
SBS Transit operates the majority of bus routes across most of Singapore’s towns. Significant exceptions include Tuas, Joo Koon, Jurong West, Jurong East, Tengah, Bukit Batok, Choa Chu Kang, Bukit Panjang, Woodlands, Sembawang, Punggol, Pasir Ris and Tampines (and from June 2027, Serangoon, Eunos and Woodleigh). In these areas, services are primarily managed by other operators under the Bus Contracting Model, specifically:

- SMRT Buses: Woodlands, Choa Chu Kang-Bukit Panjang, Jurong West and Serangoon-Eunos (from June 2027) Bus Packages.
- Tower Transit: Bulim and Sembawang-Yishun Bus Packages.
- Go-Ahead: Loyang and Tampines Bus Packages.

The share will even be lower in 2027 and it only include Seletar, Bukit Merah, Sengkang-Hougang, Bedok, Clementi and Bishan-Toa Payoh packages, only consisting of 155 routes.

SBS Transit later became the first local operator to win a tender under the BCM in April 2017, and began operating the Seletar Bus Package on 18 March 2018. It was announced in 2018 by LTA that SBS Transit had won the subsequent package, the Bukit Merah Bus Package.

In 2023, it was announced that SBS Transit retained the Bukit Merah Bus Package for its second term, but lost the bid for Jurong West Bus Package, which was awarded to SMRT Buses. In July 2024, it was announced that SBS Transit retained the Seletar Bus Package for its second term. In September 2025, it was announced that SBS Transit lost the bid for Tampines Bus Package, which was awarded to Go-Ahead. In July 2026, it was announced that SBS Transit lost the bid for Serangoon-Eunos Bus Package, which was awarded to SMRT Buses.

=== Vehicle fleet ===
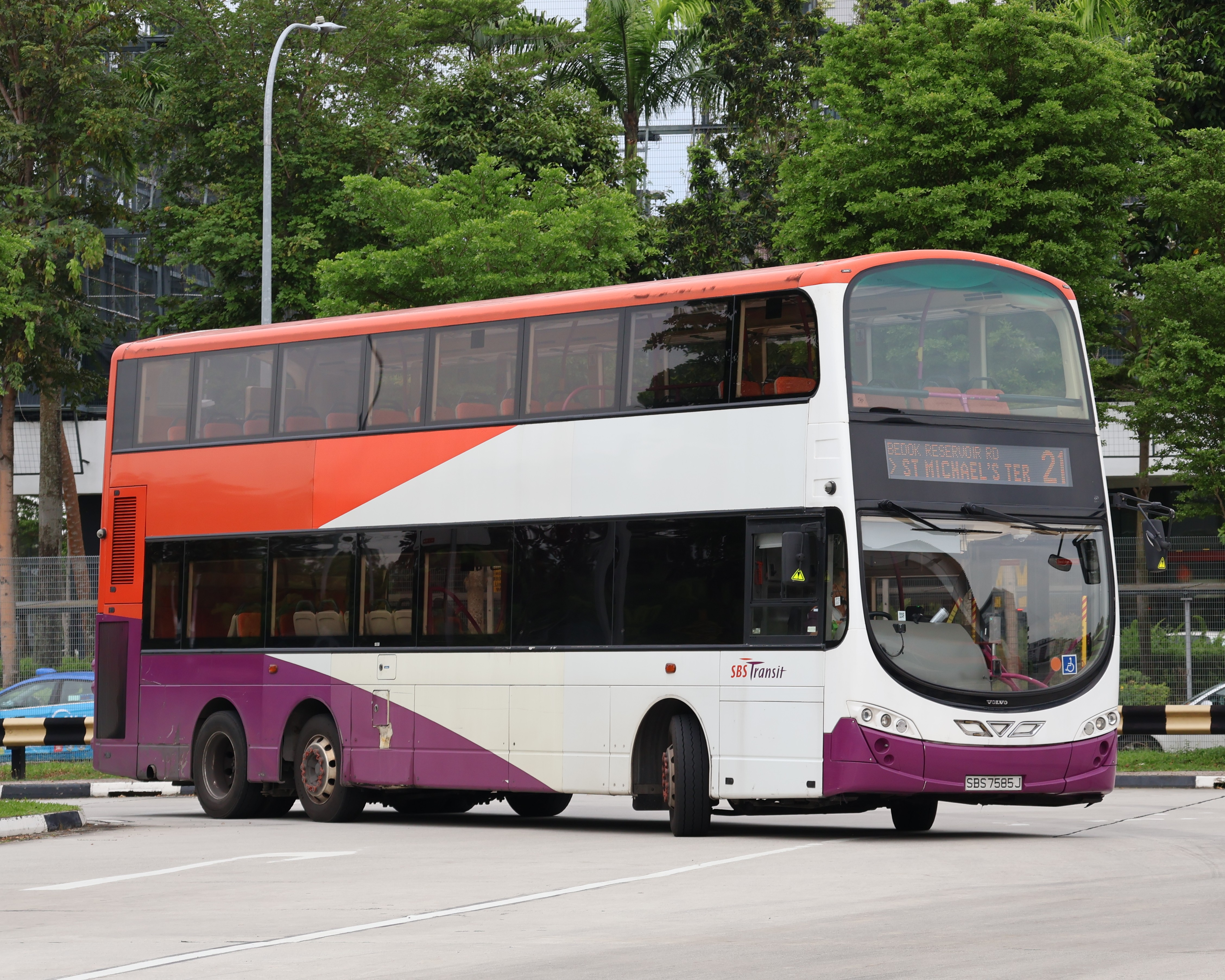
The Volvo B9TL (Wright Eclipse Gemini 2) are currently the largest fleet in SBS Transit

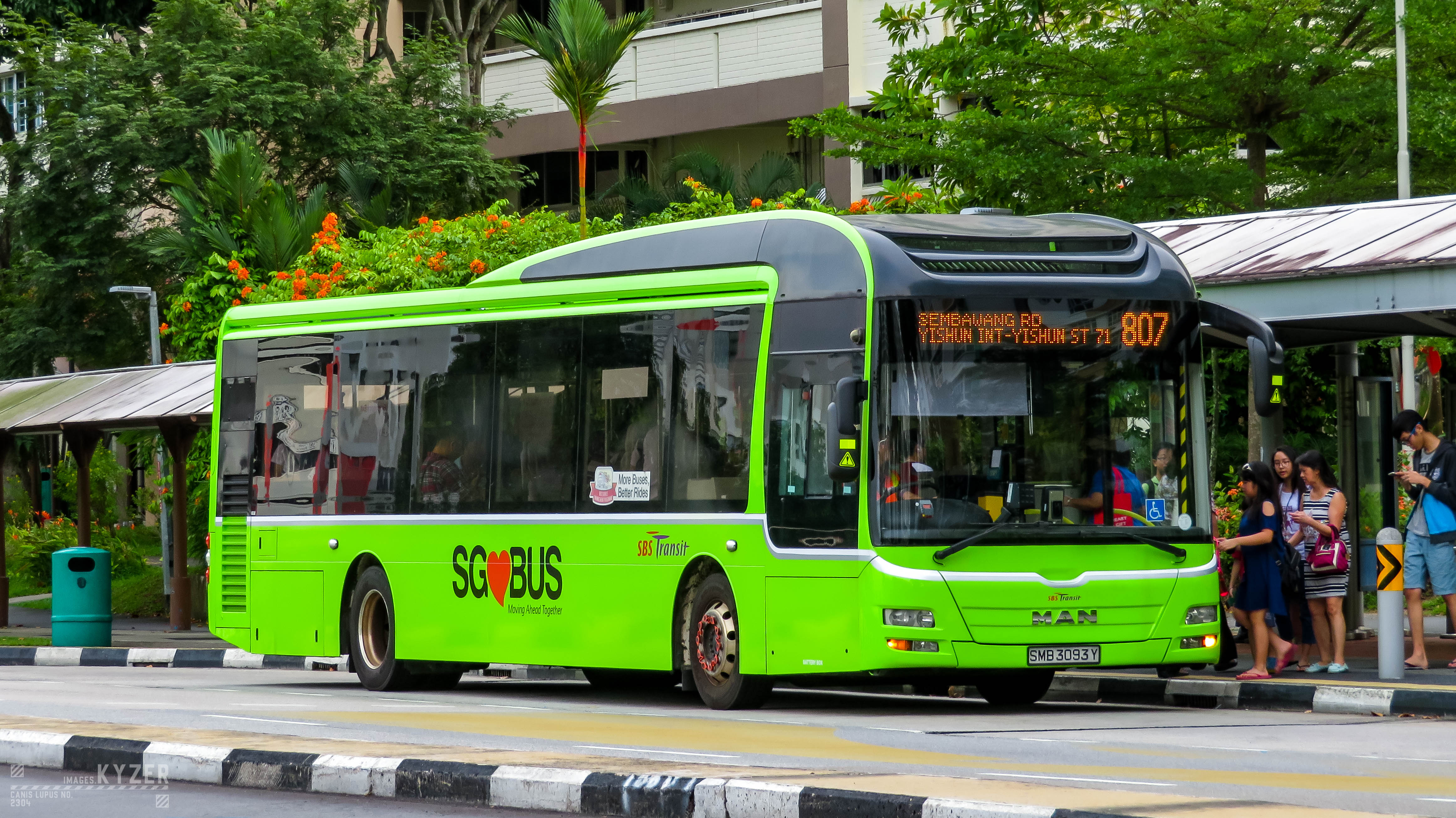
A MAN A22 bus that was transferred to SBS Transit from SMRT Buses in 2018 as part of the Seletar Bus Package

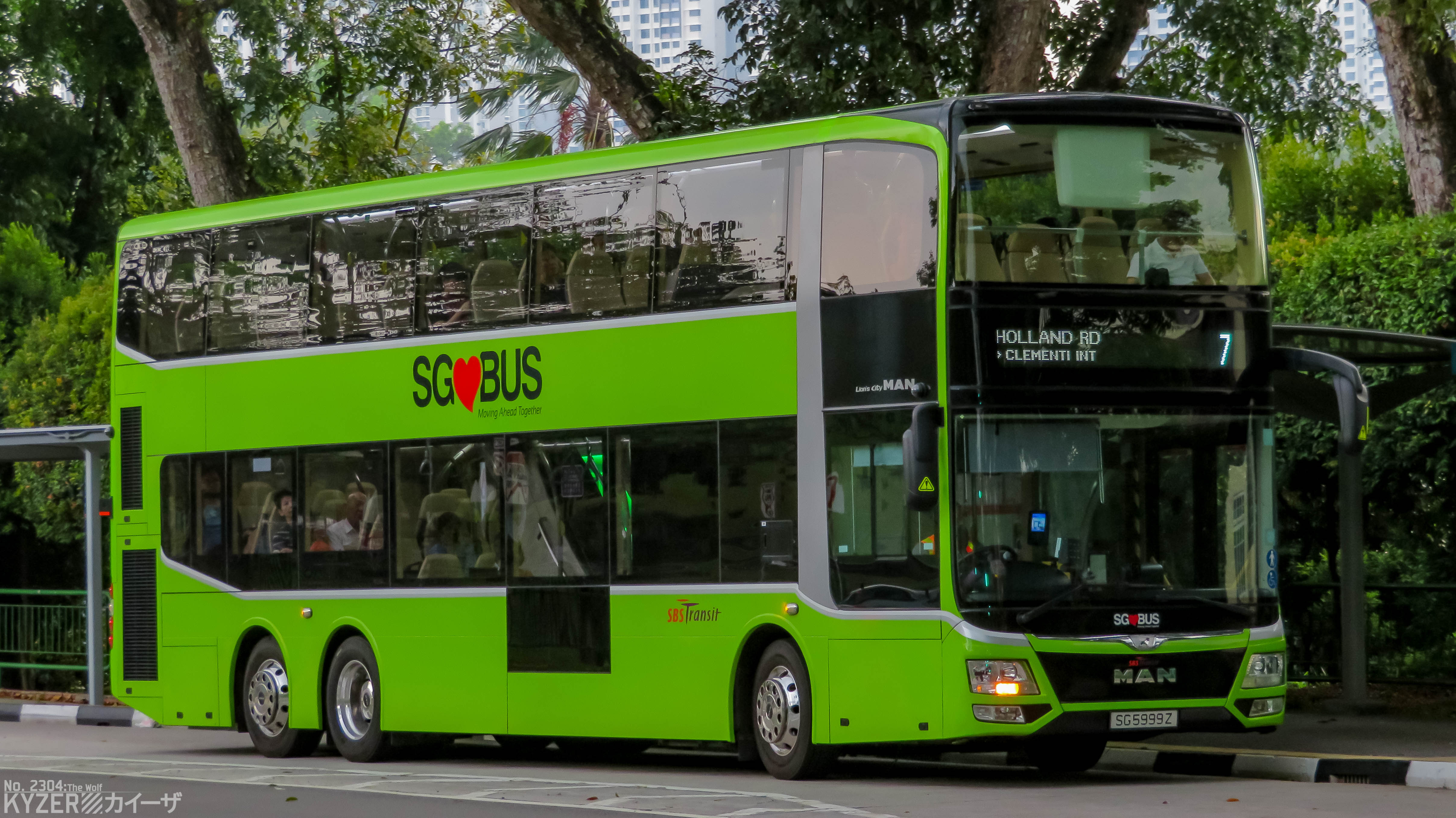
The three-door and two-staircase concept bus MAN A95 (Gemilang Mk2) demonstrator, which was introduced in 2015 and is currently operated by SBS Transit since 2018

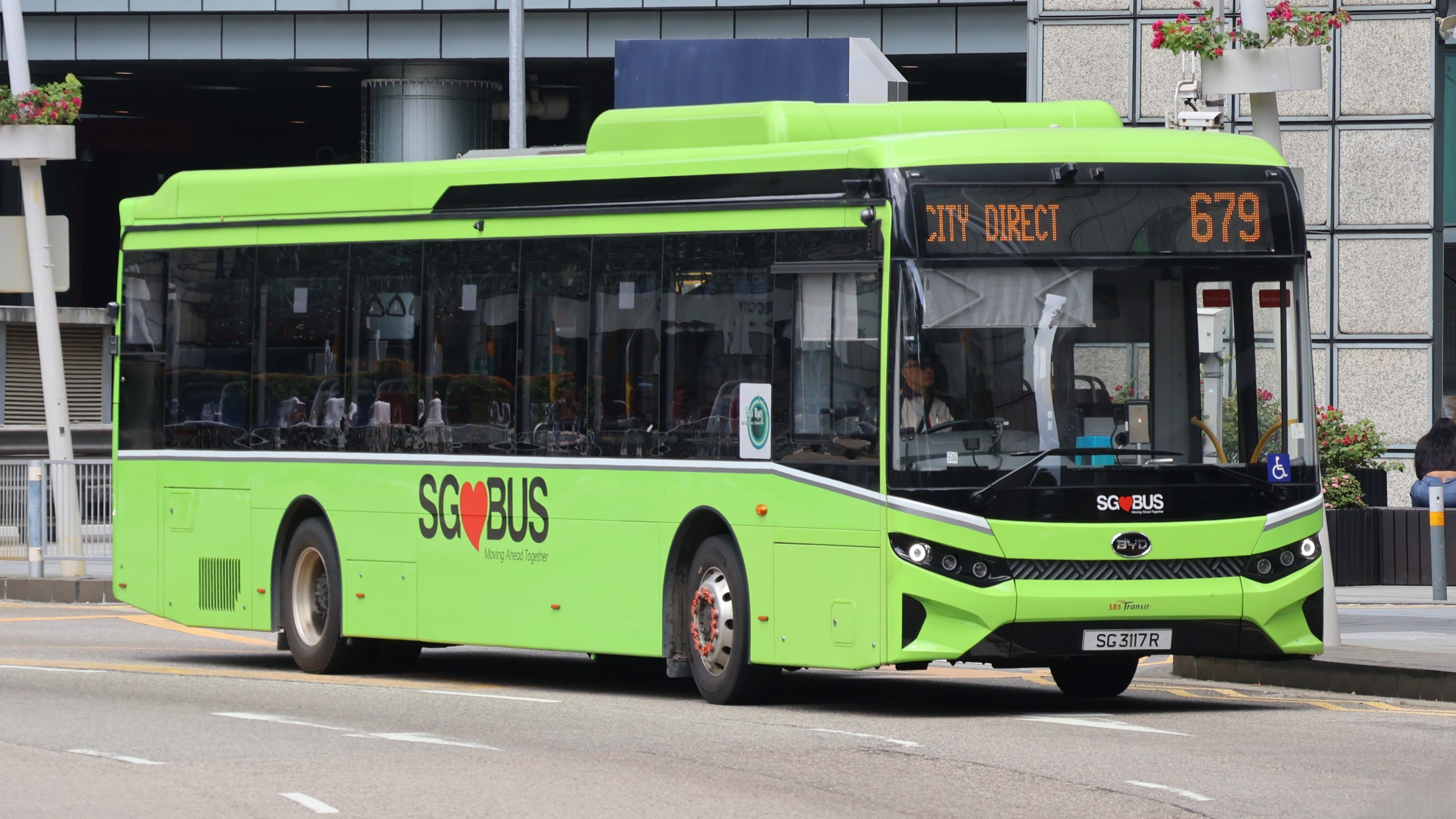
BYD BC12A04 on city direct service 679 operated by SBS Transit

As of December 2019, SBS Transit operated more than 3,500 buses.

Single deckers

- BYD GTK6127BEVB (BC12A04) (Zhuhai Guangtong)
- BYD K9 (Gemilang Coachworks)
- Linkker LM312 (Gemilang Coachworks)
- MAN NL323F Lion's City (A22) (Gemilang Coachworks)
- Mercedes-Benz O530 Citaro (Daimler Buses)
- Scania K230UB (Gemilang Coachworks)
- Zhongtong LCK6126EVG N12 (Integral)

Double deckers

- MAN ND323F Lion's City (A95) (Gemilang Coachworks)
- Scania K310UD (Gemilang Coachworks) demonstrator – used for driver training purposes
- Volvo B9TL (Gemilang Coachworks) demonstrator – used for driver training purposes
- Volvo B9TL (Wright Eclipse Gemini 2)

Articulated buses

- MAN NG363F Lion's City (A24) (Gemilang Coachworks)

=== Former vehicle fleet ===
- BYD B12A03 (integral) LTA trial specifications demonstrator
- BYD K9RC (Gemilang Coachworks) demonstrator
- Mercedes-Benz O530 Citaro C2 Hybrid demonstrator
- Volvo B57
- Volvo B8L (Wright Eclipse Gemini 3) demonstrator
- Volvo B9TL ComfortDelGro Engineering (CDGE)
- Volvo B10TL Super Olympian
- Volvo Olympian
- Leyland Olympian
- Mercedes-Benz O405 (including one demonstrator Volgren CR221-bodied O405G articulated vehicle)
- Volvo B10BLE
- Scania N113CRB
- Volvo B10M, it some two Volvo B10M Mark IV demonstrator vehicles
- Sunlong SLK6121UF14 Hybrid (Gemilang Coachworks) demonstrator
- Scania L94UB (Volgren) demonstrator
- MAN 18.240 HOCL-NL (A69) (Gemilang Coachworks) demonstrator
- Dennis Dart
- Dennis Trident 3 (Duple Metsec 5000)
- Volvo B7RLE (Soon Chow Workshop) demonstrator
- MAN 16.420 HOCL
- MAN 18.240 HOCL-NL
- Mercedes-Benz 811D
- Mercedes-Benz O305
- Volvo B5L Hybrid (MCV Evora) (All units transferred to Go Ahead Singapore)
- Alexander Dennis Enviro500 MMC (3-door variant) (All units transferred to Go-Ahead Singapore)

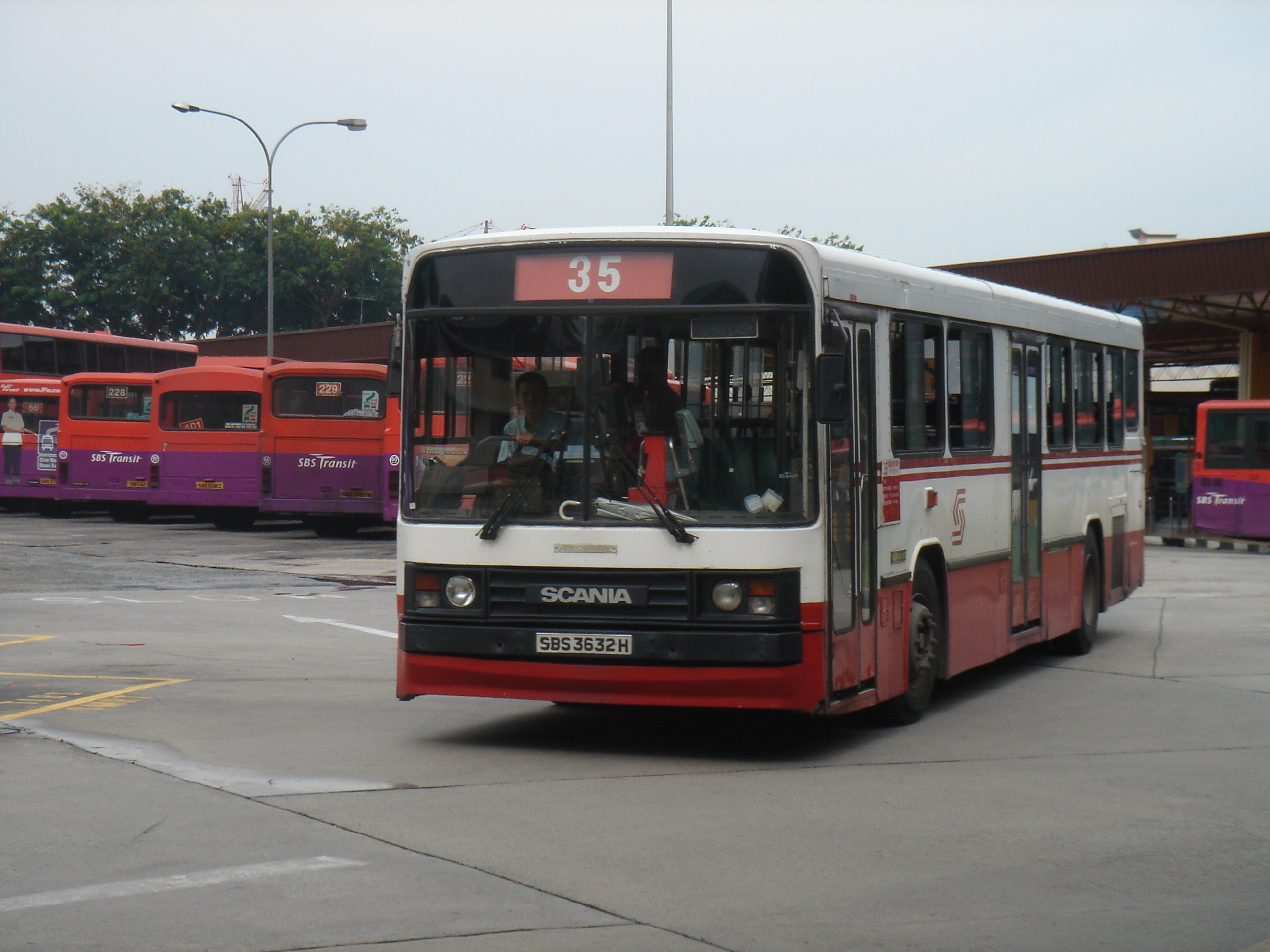
A 1989 Scania N113CRB still bearing the original SBS livery at Bedok Bus Interchange.

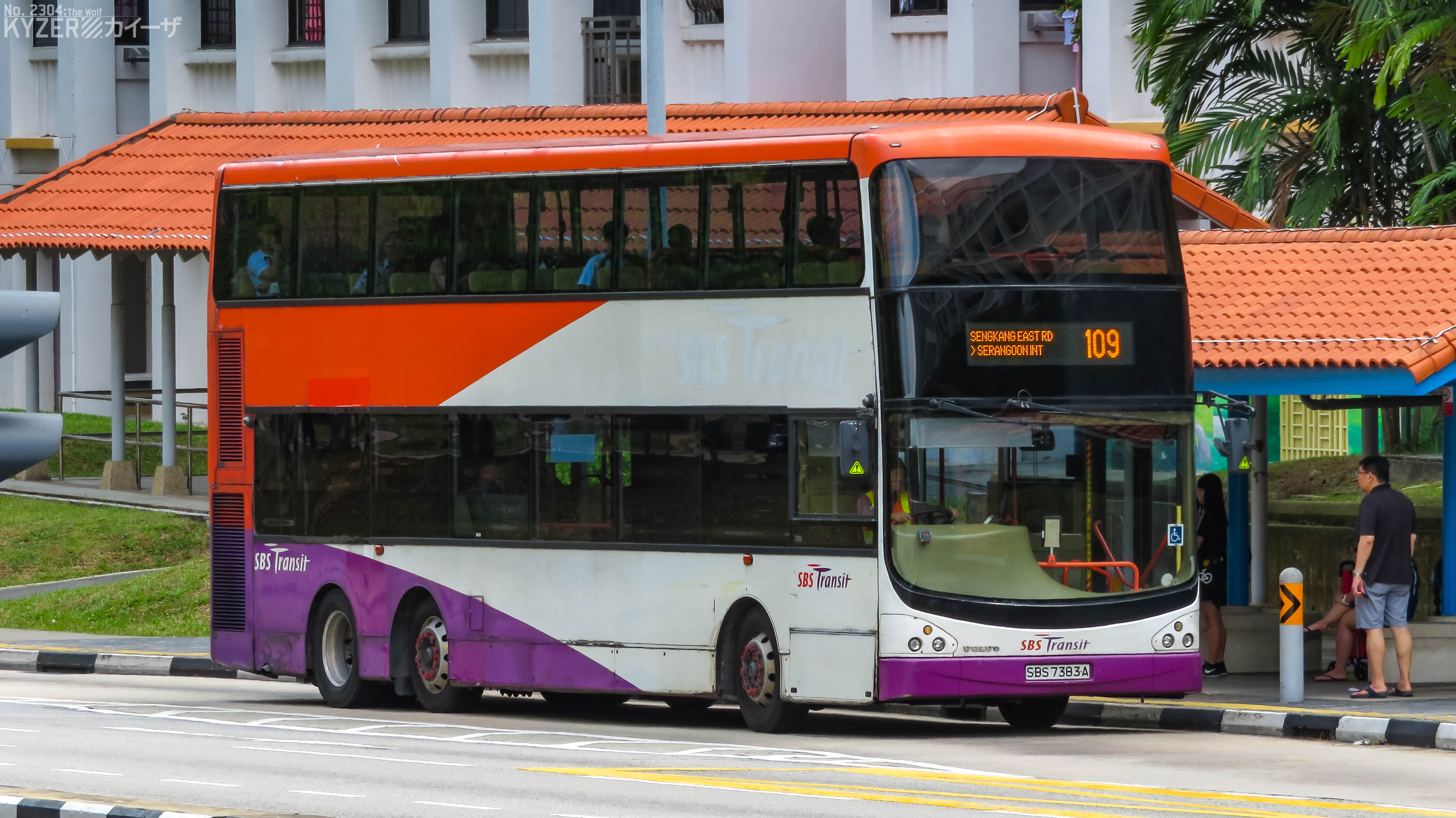
Volvo B9TL ComfortDelGro Engineering (CDGE) is the first wheelchair-accessible fleet in SBS Transit.

When SBS was first formed in 1973, it inherited a wide variety of buses of various makes from its Chinese predecessors. Examples of such buses included the Albion Viking, Mercedes-Benz LP1113 and OF1413 and Nissan Diesel RX102K3 with small numbers of Ford R192 and 226, Seddon, Fargo-Kew, Bedford and Austin. Most of these buses were bodied by local coachbuilder Soon Chow although some were bodied by other companies such as Supreme Star and Strachan. Subsequent models that were purchased by SBS included Berliet and Guy Victory in the 1970s and the Volvo B57 and Mercedes-Benz OF1417 in the 1980s, the latter which were bodied by foreign coachbuilders like New Zealand Motor Bodies and Hawke Coachwork.

In 1976, SBS purchased its first 20 Leyland Atlantean AN68 buses to evaluate the suitability of double-decker bus operation, with the buses first entering service on bus 86 on 13 June 1977. Following the success of the trial, SBS ordered another 500 Leyland Atlantean AN68 buses from 1978 to 1984, all of which were either bodied by Metal Sections or Walter Alexander Coachbuilders; SBS also conducted comparative trials of double-decker buses of other makes, namely the Leyland Olympian, Volvo Ailsa B55, Scania BR112DH, Dennis Dominator, Dennis Trident 3, Mercedes-Benz O305 and Volvo B10MD Citybus. In 1984, SBS purchased another 200 Leyland Olympian and 200 Mercedes-Benz O305 double-decker buses. SBS also conducted an evaluation of air conditioned buses (namely the ex-Singapore Airport Bus Services Mercedes-Benz OF1413 coaches) that year and conducted similar trials with other bus models like the Nissan Diesel U31S and Renault PR100 (SBS30P) before its first bulk order for 50 Scania N113CRB buses in 1989.

In the 1990s, some bus models on the roads included the Volvo B10M, Scania N113CRB, Mercedes-Benz O405, Leyland and Volvo Olympian and Dennis Dart. SBS also conducted trials of high capacity single decker buses, namely a superlong Volvo B10M Mark IV (SBS997A), an articulated Volvo B10MA (SBS998Y) and an articulated Mercedes-Benz O405G (SBS999U), in 1996 although the trial did not succeed.

== Rail ==
=== Mass Rapid Transit (MRT) ===
SBS Transit operates two of Singapore's six MRT lines in the network, the North East Line (NEL) since its opening on 20 June 2003 and the Downtown Line (DTL) since its opening on 22 December 2013. SBS Transit is also set to operate the Jurong Region Line (JRL) as a joint venture alongside French rail operator RATP Dev under the operator name Singapore One Rail when it opens in 2028.

The NEL currently spans 21.6 km and 17 stations, running from HarbourFront in the south-west to Punggol Coast in the north-east. As of 2023, the NEL uses a fleet composed of three very similar series of 49 Alstom Metropolis train-sets, namely the C751A, C751C and C851E. The operating license for the NEL was awarded to SBS Transit in order to foster competition with SMRT Trains and to create multi-modal public transport companies, each specialising in their own district. In 2018, it was confirmed that SBS Transit's contract for maintaining the NEL would last until 31 March 2033.

The NEL was Singapore's third metro line and the city's first automated and driverless system. At times, it has been referred to as "the first driverless heavy metro line in the world" or the "world's first fully automated and driverless high-capacity rapid transit line" by some. While driverless metro systems have existed long before (notably the Lille Metro since 1983, the Vancouver Skytrain since 1985 and the Kelana Jaya Line and Paris Métro Line 14 since 1998), the NEL is the first application of a fully automated and driverless metro system with heavy rail characteristics such as an overhead catenary (in contrast to earlier systems using third rail) and 1,435 mm standard-gauge (in contrast to earlier systems featuring smaller rail profiles). Till today, it is the only MRT line in Singapore using the overhead catenary electrical system while the rest of Singapore's MRT uses the third rail.

The DTL currently spans 41.9 km and 35 stations as of 2025, running from Bukit Panjang station in the north-west to Expo station in the east via the Central Area. The DTL is fully automated and driverless as well and consists of a fleet of 92 Bombardier Movia C951 trainsets.

Name	Image	Maximum speed (km/h)		Trains built	Cars built	Cars per set	Lines served	Built	Number in service	Introduction
Name	Image	Design	Service	Trains built	Cars built	Cars per set	Lines served	Built	Number in service	Introduction
C751A		100	90	25	150	6	North East Line	2000‍–‍2003; 2019‍–‍2026 (Note: Refurbished)	25	20 June 2003
C751C		100	90	18	108	6	North East Line	2014‍–‍2016	18	1 October 2015
C851E		100	90	6	36	6	North East Line	2020‍–‍2023	6	28 July 2023
C951(A)		90	80	92	276	3	Downtown Line	2011‍–‍2017	92	22 December 2013
J151		70	TBA	62	186	3	Jurong Region Line	2022‍–‍2026	0	2028

- The trains are classified as contracts unlike other countries which use "class".

=== Light Rail Transit (LRT) ===
Out of three LRT lines in Singapore, two are operated and maintained by SBS Transit, namely the Sengkang LRT line and Punggol LRT line (SPLRT). These lines serve a total of 29 stations and provide feeder connections to Sengkang and Punggol stations. As of 2025, these lines use a fleet of 57 sets comprising two series of Mitsubishi Heavy Industries Crystal Mover APMs (namely the C810 and C810A), a number expected to increase in the future with the introduction of C810D APMs. In 2018, it was confirmed that SBS Transit's contract for both LRT lines would run until 31 March 2033.

Name	Image	Maximum speed (km/h)		Trains built	Cars per set	Lines served	Built	Number in service	Introduction	Decommissioned
Name	Image	Design	Service	Trains built	Cars per set	Lines served	Built	Number in service	Introduction	Decommissioned
C810		80	70	41	1 or 2	Sengkang LRT; Punggol LRT	2000 – 2003	39	18 January 2003	2025 – 2028
C810A		80	70	16	1 or 2	Sengkang LRT; Punggol LRT	2012 – 2016	16	5 April 2016	—N/a
C810D		80	70	25	2	Sengkang LRT; Punggol LRT	2024 – 2027	2	15 July 2025	—N/a

- The trains are classified as contracts unlike other countries which use "class".

=== Depots ===
Out of ten operational rail depots in Singapore, SBS Transit maintains three, namely:

- Sengkang Depot which houses NEL and SPLRT trains. The depot is undergoing an expansion program which is targeted for completion in 2027 in order to accommodate more trains, after being in operation since 2003.
- Tai Seng Facility Building which houses some DTL trains.
- Gali Batu Depot which houses the majority of DTL trains. It has undergone expansion towards the end of 2010s.
- East Coast Integrated Depot which is expected to house DTL trains upon its opening in 2026.

== Operations ==
The table below shows the changes in SBS Transit's operated bus and train over the years.

Year	Bus Routes	Bus Fleet	Train Fleet	Train Stations	Yearly train ridership
2026	TBA	TBA	TBA	TBA	
2025	204	TBC	TBC	81	15,351,643
2024	196	3,329	198	81	
2023	222	3,572	198	78	
2022	218	3,562	192	78	
2021	228	3,548	192	78	
2020	226	3,531	192	78	
2019	223	3,512	192	78	
2018	222	3,471	192	78	

Bus Depot(s)

Depot	Area Served	Status
Ang Mo Kio Bus Depot	Central Region	Closed; Demolished
Ayer Rajah Bus Park	NUS	Closed; facility upkeep
Bedok North Bus Depot	Eastern Region	Operational
Braddell Bus Park	Toa Payoh	Closed; Demolished
Bukit Batok Bus Depot	Clementi	Operational
Hougang Bus Depot	Central & North East Region	Operational
Seletar Bus Depot	North Region	Operational
Sengkang West Bus Depot	North East Region	Operational
Soon Lee Bus Depot	Western Region	Sold to LTA; Transferred to SMRT Buses
Ulu Pandan Bus Depot	South & West Region	Operational

Train Depot(s)

Depot	Train Line Served	Status
East Coast Integrated Depot	Downtown Line	Under Testing
Gali Batu Train Depot	Downtown Line	Operational
Sengkang Train Depot	North East Line Sengkang-Punggol LRT	Operational
Tai Seng Facility Building	Downtown Line	Operational
Tengah Train Depot	Jurong Region Line	Under Testing
