= Jurong Region Line =

Mass Rapid Transit line in Singapore

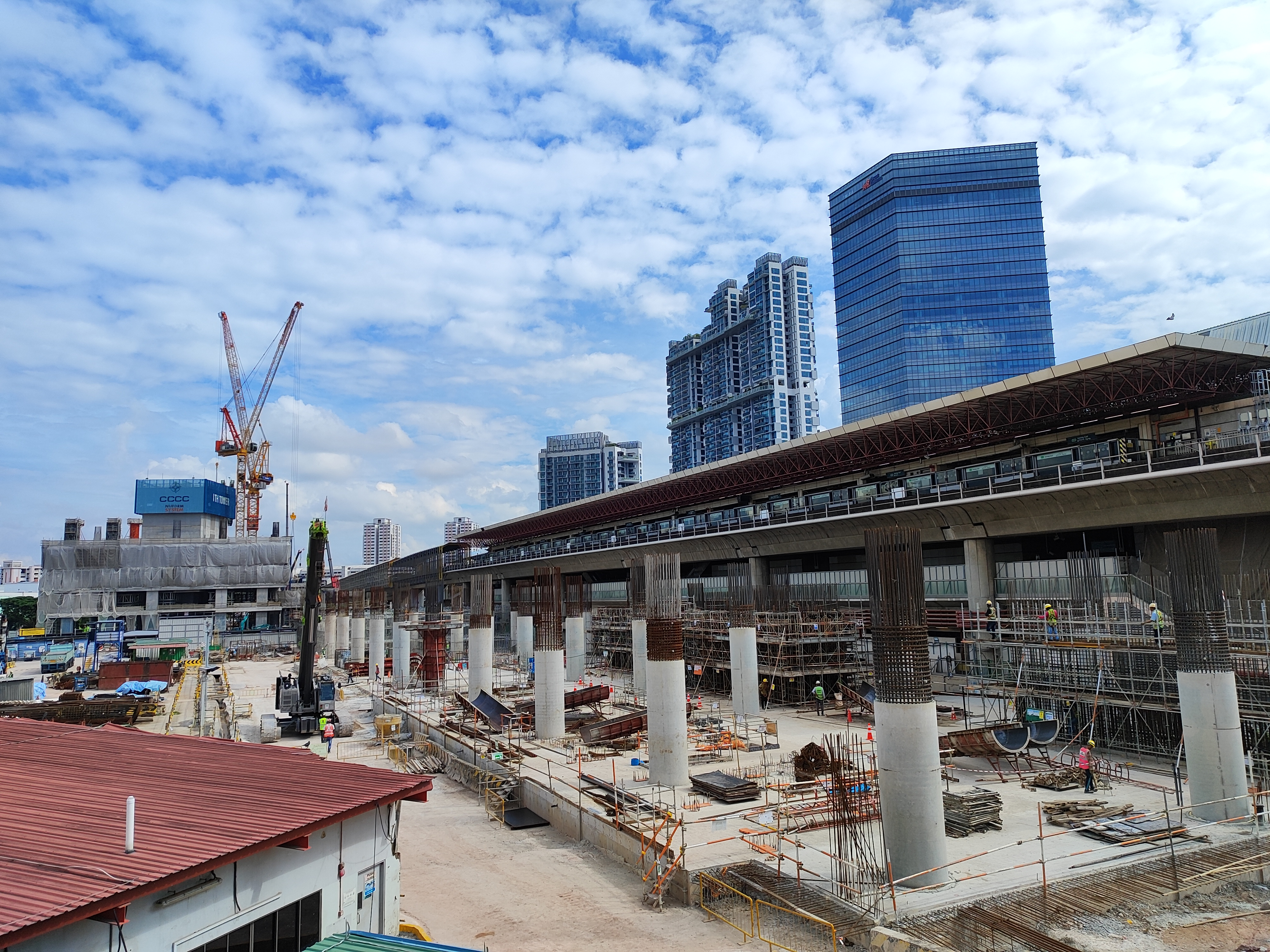
- JRL site at Jurong East station

Overview
- Native name: Malay: Laluan Daerah Jurong; Chinese: 裕廊区域线; Tamil: ஜூரோங் வட்டாரப் பாதை
- Status: Under construction
- Owner: Land Transport Authority
- Locale: Singapore
- Termini: Choa Chu Kang; Jurong Pier; Pandan Reservoir; Peng Kang Hill
- Stations: 24 (Note: 24 confirmed, with potential additional stations on the West Coast Extension still under planning)
- Color on map: Teal (#0099aa)

Service
- Type: Rapid transit Light metro
- System: Mass Rapid Transit (Singapore)
- Services: 2 (JRL West and JRL East)
- Operator(s): Singapore One Rail (Note: SBS Transit holds a majority share of 75.01%, with RATP Dev holding the remaining 24.99%.) (SBS Transit and RATP Dev)
- Depot: Tengah
- Rolling stock: Hyundai Rotem J151

History
- Planned opening: mid-2028 (JRL1); 2028 (JRL2); 2029 (JRL3); mid-2030s (JS2A); late-2030s (WCE1 to West Coast); early-2040s (WCE2 to Kent Ridge)

Technical
- Line length: ~25.68 km (15.96 mi)
- Character: Fully elevated
- Track gauge: 1,435 mm (4 ft 8 1/2 in) standard gauge
- Electrification: 750 V DC third rail
- Operating speed: 70 km/h (43 mph)
Maps
Interactive Map

The Jurong Region Line (JRL) is a Mass Rapid Transit (MRT) line under construction in Singapore, intended to serve the western region of the country, particularly the new town of Tengah and its surrounding districts. First proposed as a Light Rail Transit (LRT) system in 2001, the project was subsequently deferred before re-emerging in its current form as a fully fledged MRT line, which was officially confirmed in 2013. Construction is underway; the line is scheduled to open in stages, with the first stage opening in 2028. Upon completion, it will become Singapore's first fully elevated MRT line and the fifth to operate entirely with automated, driverless trains.

The JRL will initially comprise 24 stations, extending north to Choa Chu Kang, south to Jurong Pier, west to Peng Kang Hill and east to Pandan Reservoir. A future extension linking Pandan Reservoir station of the JRL to West Coast station of the Cross Island Line and Kent Ridge of the Circle Line is planned for completion in the late 2030s to early 2040s, further enhancing connectivity between Singapore's western districts. The line will appear in teal on the MRT system map and will be the seventh MRT line in the national rail network.

Singapore One Rail (SOR), a joint venture between SBS Transit and RATP Dev Asia Pacific, is planned to operate the line. A fleet of three-car Hyundai Rotem's J151 trains will run on the line, with provisions for future extensions to four cars. The JRL will use the Siemens moving-block signalling system.

== History ==
=== Planning ===
Plans for a rail transit link serving the Jurong area can be traced back to the 1990s. A 1996 white paper proposed a light rail line connecting Nanyang Technological University (NTU) with Boon Lay station on the East–West Line (EWL). In November 1998, the Land Transport Authority (LTA) announced that feasibility studies were being conducted for a light rail transit (LRT) system in Jurong, although then-Communications Minister Mah Bow Tan stated that the project's viability would depend on future demand and ridership levels.

The Jurong Region Line (JRL) was formally announced on 23 October 2001 by then-Transport Minister Yeo Cheow Tong. Conceived as a light rail system, the line was intended to serve residential areas in Jurong beyond the reach of the EWL while also providing a direct connection to NTU. However, passenger demand projections remained insufficient to justify construction, and in May 2008 the project was placed on hold owing to a lack of financial viability.

Renewed plans for the line emerged as part of the 2013 Land Transport Master Plan, announced by then-Transport Minister Lui Tuck Yew in January that year. Reflecting changing development priorities in western Singapore, the proposed line was expanded beyond its earlier concept and was intended to serve Choa Chu Kang, Tengah, Bukit Batok, Jurong East, West Coast, Jurong West, NTU and Jurong Industrial Estate.

=== Construction of initial phases ===
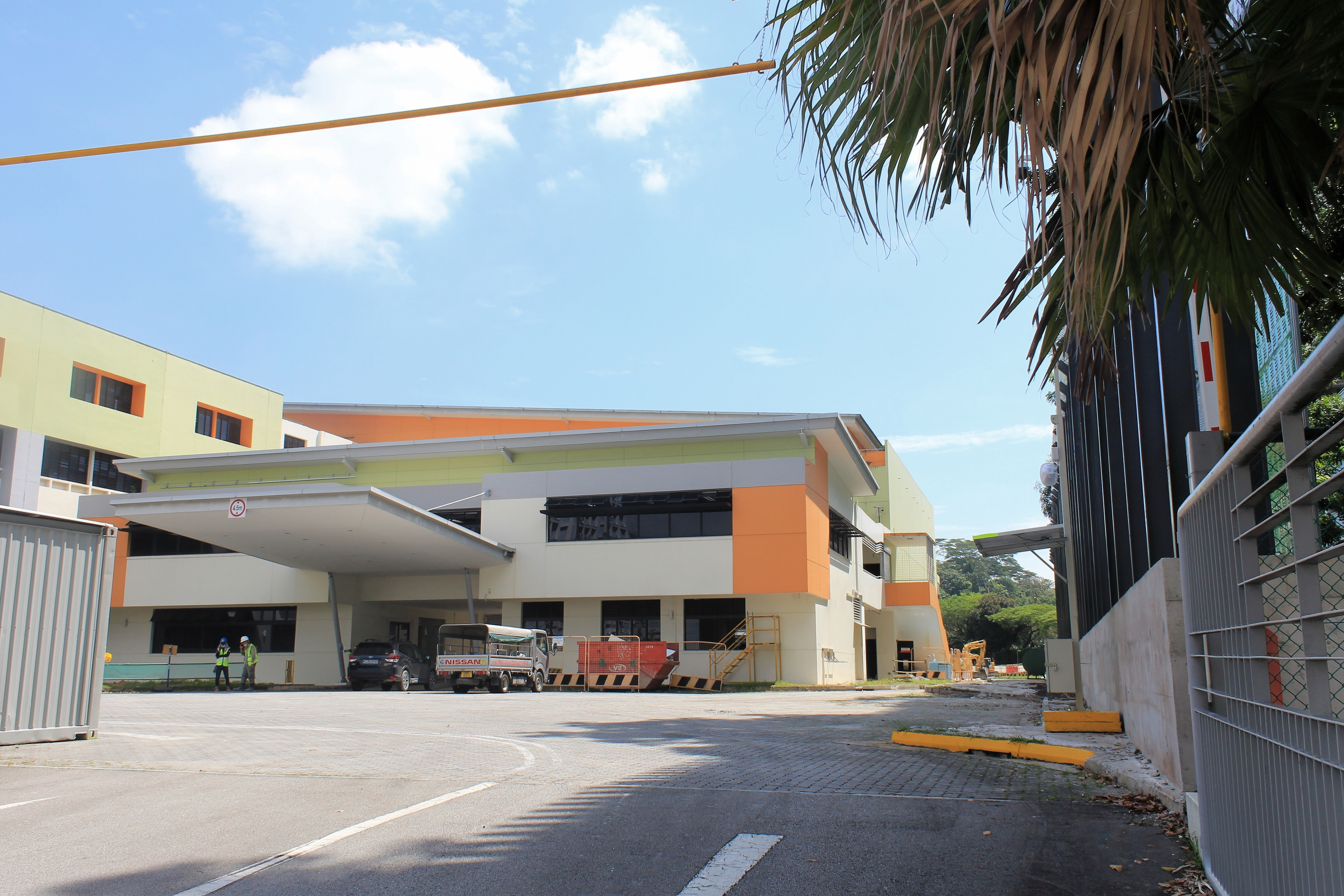
Pioneer Primary School, which was acquired to facilitate the construction of viaducts

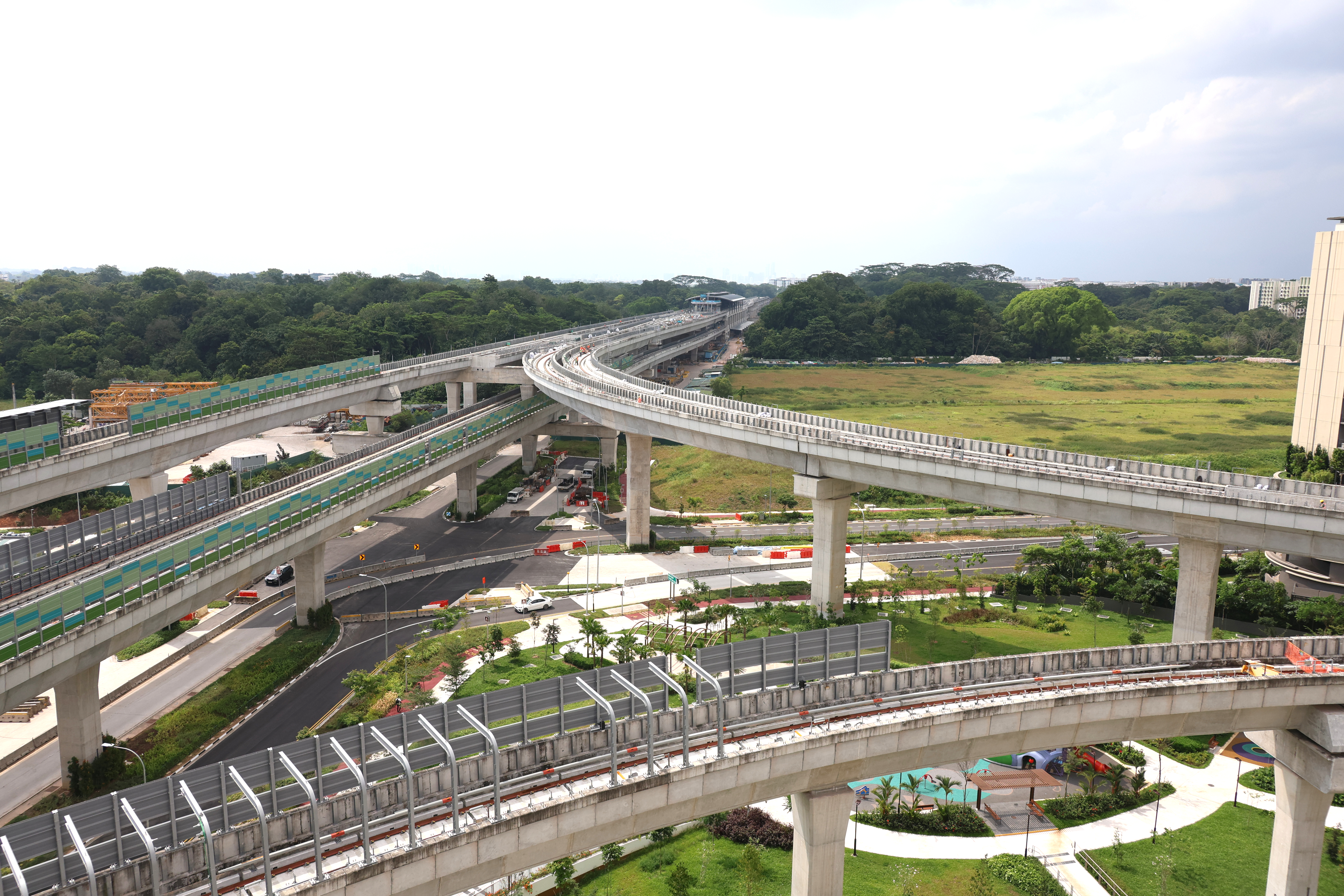
Ongoing construction works on the junction before Tengah MRT station

Jurong Region Line stations timeline
Date	Project	Description
mid-2028	Stage 1 (JRL1)	Choa Chu Kang – Boon Lay & Bahar Junction – Tawas
2028	Stage 2 (JRL2)	Tengah – Pandan Reservoir
2029	Stage 3 (JRL3)	Enterprise – Jurong Pier & Nanyang Gateway – Peng Kang Hill
mid-2030s	JS2A station	Opening of JS2A infill station
late-2030s	West Coast Extension Phase 1 (WCE1)	Pandan Reservoir – West Coast
early-2040s	West Coast Extension Phase 2 (WCE2)	West Coast – Kent Ridge

The final alignment of the JRL was announced on 9 May 2018. The line was planned as a 25.68-kilometre (15.96 mi) medium-capacity MRT system comprising 24 stations and constructed in three phases. The first phase consisted of the western section from Choa Chu Kang to Bahar Junction, together with branches to Tawas and Boon Lay. The second phase comprised the eastern section extending from Tengah to Pandan Reservoir, while the final phase would continue westwards to NTU and Jurong Pier. The three phases were initially scheduled for completion between 2026 and 2028.

The alignment attracted discussion owing to its multiple branches and indirect routing. While many NTU students welcomed the prospect of a rail connection to the university, some observed that journeys between NTU and Boon Lay would require a transfer at Bahar Junction, making existing direct bus services more convenient. Transport analysts noted that the alignment represented a compromise between operational efficiency and the constraints of navigating established residential and industrial developments. Although designated as an MRT line, the JRL was designed to use smaller trainsets capable of negotiating the tighter curves required by its route.

Preparatory works for the project involved a number of land acquisitions and infrastructure relocations. A multi-storey car park in Choa Chu Kang was acquired, while portions of 19 land plots were partially acquired, primarily affecting ancillary features such as fences and landscaped verges. To accommodate construction works, the Choa Chu Kang and Jurong East bus interchanges were relocated on 16 December 2018 and 6 December 2020 respectively. Pioneer Primary School was merged with Juying Primary School in 2022, enabling a revised alignment that would pass through the former school's premises.

Contracts for the first group of stations were awarded in September 2019. This was followed by the award of the contract for Tengah Depot in November 2019 and the rolling stock contract in February 2020. The final station contract was awarded in May 2022. Construction of the line was formally marked by a groundbreaking ceremony on 13 January 2023.

In May 2023, LTA invited tenders for the operation of the line. The operating contract was awarded in November 2024 to Singapore One Rail (SOR), a joint venture between SBS Transit and RATP Dev Asia Pacific, for S$750 million. The venture will operate the line under an initial nine-year licence, with the possibility of a two-year extension. The arrangement marked the first time a Singapore MRT line had been entrusted to a joint-venture operator, with SBS Transit holding a 75.01 per cent stake and RATP Dev the remaining 24.99 per cent.

=== Opening ===
In March 2026, the Ministry of Transport announced that the opening of the first stage had been postponed to mid-2028. The delay was attributed to earlier disruptions arising from the COVID-19 pandemic, as well as the challenges associated with constructing an entirely elevated railway through densely developed urban areas. Works adjacent to Housing and Development Board (HDB) estates, crossings over major roads including the Pan Island Expressway (PIE), and additional ground preparation required for a viaduct crossing over a canal further extended the construction timeline. To compensate for the delay, a shuttle bus service, which would serve key stations along the line, is planned to be launched in the second half of 2027.

=== Future plans ===
On 25 August 2015, then-Transport Minister Lui Tuck Yew announced that LTA was studying a possible extension through Pasir Panjang to connect with the Circle Line at Haw Par Villa station. The proposal was intended to strengthen transport links between western Singapore and the Central Business District, with completion envisaged by around 2030 if found to be feasible.

Interest in the extension intensified following the disruption of the East–West Line in 2024. Then-Non-Constituency Member of Parliament (NCMP) Leong Mun Wai called for the extension to proceed, arguing that a connection to both the Circle Line and the future Cross Island Line would improve transport resilience in western Singapore. Responding to the proposal, then-Senior Minister of State for Transport Amy Khor stated that LTA was continuing to evaluate the project alongside future developments in the area.

On 5 March 2025, then-Transport Minister Chee Hong Tat confirmed that the extension would proceed in two stages. Following further studies of anticipated transport demand and long-term land-use plans, LTA concluded that a connection to Kent Ridge station would provide greater benefits than the previously proposed link to Haw Par Villa. The first stage, targeted for completion in the late 2030s, will extend the line to West Coast station on the Cross Island Line. A second stage, planned for the early 2040s, will continue the line to Kent Ridge station. The final alignment has yet to be determined, although it may include intermediate stations and a route through the National University of Singapore (NUS). Engineering studies for the extension are scheduled to begin in 2026.An infill station between Choa Chu Kang West and Tengah stations was announced in March 2026. The station is intended to serve Tengah's future Forest Hill district and is expected to open in the mid-2030s, in tandem with the area's development.

== Network and operations ==
=== Route ===
Geographically accurate map of the Jurong Region Line

The Jurong Region Line (JRL) is a medium-capacity line. Spanning approximately 24 km (15-mile), the JRL will serve at least 24 stations in Chua Chu Kang, Jurong, Tengah and the south-western parts of Singapore. Shaped like a "H", the four JRL branches extend to Choa Chu Kang in the north, Jurong Pier in the south, Pandan Reservoir in the east and Peng Kang Hill in the west.

From Choa Chu Kang, the JRL briefly runs parallel to the North–South Line (NSL) before turning southwest along Choa Chu Kang Avenue 3. At Tengah, the line splits, with the east branch diverging toward Pandan Reservoir. As the JRL continues west, the Tengah Depot connects the line between the Hong Kah and Corporation stations. After crossing the Pan Island Expressway (PIE), the JRL runs along Jurong West Avenue 2 until Bahar Junction station, where it converges with the Jurong Pier and Peng Kang Hill branches.

On the Jurong Pier branch, the JRL turns south along Jurong West Street 64 and crosses the East–West Line (EWL) at Boon Lay station. The line continues southward along Jalan Boon Lay and Jurong Pier Road, crossing the Ayer Rajah Expressway between the Tukang and Jurong Hill stations before terminating at Jurong Pier station. The Peng Kang Hill branch runs northwest along Jurong West Street 75 via Gek Poh station. After crossing the PIE, the line turns north to Tawas station and then west through the Nanyang Technological University. The branch terminates at Peng Kang Hill station.

The Pandan Reservoir branch runs southeast through the Tengah estate along Plantation Crescent and Bukit Batok Road. The line briefly turns east to Bukit Batok West station and parallels the PIE before turning south along Jurong East Central. After interchanging with the NSL and EWL at Jurong East station, the line continues southeast along Jurong Town Hall Road before terminating at Pandan Reservoir station. As part of the West Coast Extension, the JRL will continue to the Circle Line at Kent Ridge station by the early 2040s.

=== Stations ===
The line has 24 stations between Choa Chu Kang and the various termini at Jurong Pier, Pandan Reservoir and Peng Kang Hill, in addition to three planned stations. Seven stations on the JRL will interchange with other MRT and LRT lines,

Station code	Station name	Images	Interchange; Adjacent transportation	Opening	Cost
Stage 1 (under construction, to be ready by mid-2028)
JS1 NS4 BP1	Choa Chu Kang		North–South Line; Bukit Panjang LRT ― Choa Chu Kang	mid-2028; 1 year's time	S$465.2 million
JS2	Choa Chu Kang West		—	mid-2028; 1 year's time	S$465.2 million
JS3	Tengah		Jurong Region Line (East) (2028) ― Tengah	mid-2028; 1 year's time	S$465.2 million
JS4	Hong Kah		—	mid-2028; 1 year's time	S$274.3 million
JS5	Corporation		—	mid-2028; 1 year's time	S$274.3 million
JS6	Jurong West		—	mid-2028; 1 year's time	S$210.1 million
JS7	Bahar Junction		Jurong Region Line (West)	mid-2028; 1 year's time	S$210.1 million
JS8 EW27	Boon Lay		East–West Line ― Boon Lay	mid-2028; 1 year's time	S$172.0 million
JW1	Gek Poh		—	mid-2028; 1 year's time	S$226.6 million
JW2	Tawas		—	mid-2028; 1 year's time	S$226.6 million
Stage 2 (under construction, to be ready by 2028)
JE1	Tengah Plantation		—	2028; 2 years' time	S$265.4 million
JE2	Tengah Park		—	2028; 2 years' time	S$265.4 million
JE3	Bukit Batok West		—	2028; 2 years' time	S$265.4 million
JE4	Toh Guan		—	2028; 2 years' time	S$320.4 million (Note: Total cost for Toh Guan, Jurong Town Hall and Pandan Reservoir stations)
JE5 NS1 EW24	Jurong East		North–South Line; East–West Line ― Jurong East	2028; 2 years' time	S$197.4 million
JE6	Jurong Town Hall		—	2028; 2 years' time	S$320.4 million
JE7	Pandan Reservoir		—	2028; 2 years' time	S$320.4 million
Stage 3 (under construction, to be ready by 2029)
JS9	Enterprise		—	2029; 3 years' time	S$241.0 million
JS10	Tukang		—	2029; 3 years' time	S$241.0 million
JS11	Jurong Hill		—	2029; 3 years' time	S$263.0 million
JS12 CR21	Jurong Pier		Cross Island Line (late-2030s)	2029; 3 years' time	S$263.0 million
JW3	Nanyang Gateway		—	2029; 3 years' time	S$263.0 million
JW4	Nanyang Crescent		—	2029; 3 years' time	S$263.0 million
JW5	Peng Kang Hill		—	2029; 3 years' time	S$148.0 million
JS2A infill station (under planning, to be ready by mid-2030s)
JS2A	JS2A		—	mid-2030s; 9 years' time	TBA
WCE Phase 1 (under planning, to be ready by late-2030s)
JE CR18	West Coast		Cross Island Line	late-2030s; 13 years' time	TBA
WCE Phase 2 (under planning, to be ready by early-2040s)
JE CC24	Kent Ridge		Circle Line	early-2040s; 14 years' time	TBA

== Infrastructure ==
=== Rolling stock ===
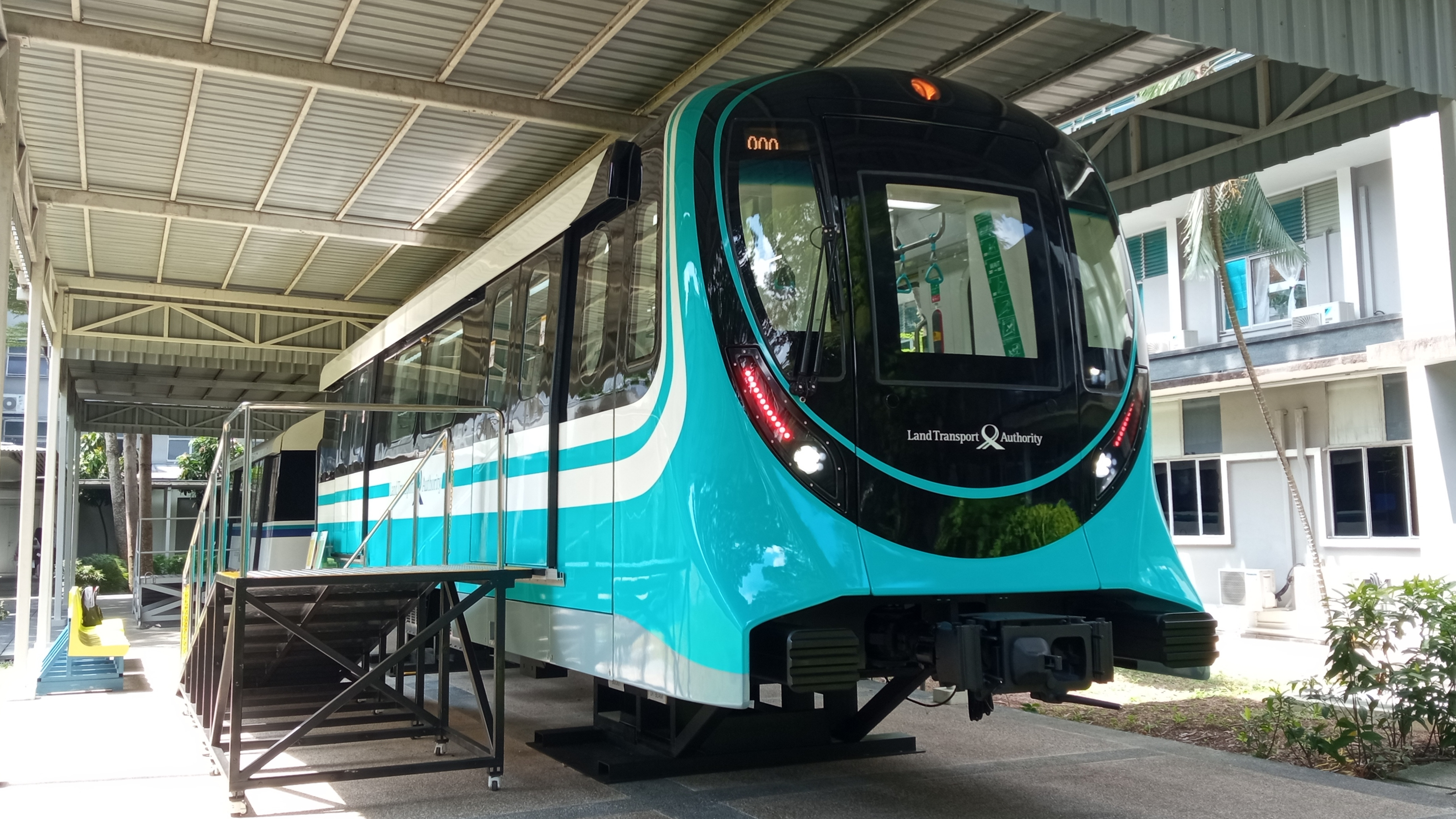
Exterior mockup of the J151

The JRL will be operated by a fleet of 62 Hyundai Rotem J151 trains. Designed specifically for the line's alignment, the fully automated trains are configured in three-car formations, with provisions for expansion to four cars as passenger demand grows. Owing to the tight curves along the route, the trains are smaller than those used on Singapore's other MRT lines, with each car measuring 18.6 m (61 ft) in length and 2.75 m (9.0 ft) in width. To facilitate faster boarding and alighting, every car is fitted with three 1.5 m (4.9 ft)-wide doors on each side.

Powered by a 750 V DC third-rail system, the trains are capable of operating at speeds of up to 70 km/h (43 mph). They also introduce two new technologies to Singapore's rail network: Condition Based Maintenance (CBM), which enables real-time monitoring of train conditions, and Automatic Track Inspection (ATI), which continuously detects track defects. In the event of a power failure, onboard emergency batteries allow trains to proceed to the nearest station. The first JRL trains arrived in Singapore in September 2025.

=== Depot ===
The line is supported by Tengah Depot, a 44.5 ha (110-acre) at-grade facility that serves as the primary maintenance and stabling depot for the JRL fleet. Constructed by China Railway 11 Bureau Group Corporation at a cost of S$739.5 million (US$498 million), the depot incorporates the line's Operations Control Centre and has capacity for up to 100 trains.

Located west of Tengah, the depot is integrated with a bus depot and a workers' dormitory, forming a multi-purpose transport and support complex. Plans were also considered for an additional stabling facility near Peng Kang Hill station, which would have enhanced train launching and withdrawal operations along the line.

=== Signalling technology ===
The JRL employs Siemens' Trainguard Sirius communications-based train control (CBTC) system, a moving-block signalling technology that enables fully automated operation at Grade of Automation 4 (GoA4). The radio-based system continuously monitors train locations and speeds, allowing precise control of train movements across the network.

The signalling architecture incorporates several subsystems. Automatic Train Protection (ATP) regulates train speeds and maintains safe separation between services, while the Controlguide Rail 9000 Automatic Train Supervision (ATS) system manages train tracking and service scheduling. Train routing and interlocking functions are handled by the Trackguard Westrace MKII computer-based interlocking (CBI) system, which prevents conflicting signal and point settings. Similar CBTC technology is also used on Singapore's Downtown Line.

Passenger safety at stations is enhanced through the use of Siemens platform screen doors installed along the network.
