= Singapore One Rail =

Public transport operator in Singapore

- Type: Subsidiary
- Industry: Public transport
- Founded: 15 January 2025; 21 months ago
- Headquarters: Singapore
- Area served: Singapore
- Key people: Anthony Mok Peng Fai (CEO)
- Services: Rail service
- Parent: SBS Transit (75.01%); RATP Dev Asia (24.99%)
- Footnotes: Formation date

Singapore One Rail (abbreviation: SOR) is a public transport operator in Singapore, formed in joint venture between Singapore public transport operator SBS Transit and RATP Dev Asia.

A majority of the shares are owned by SBS Transit at 75.01%, with RATP Dev holding the remaining 24.99%.

== History ==
In 2023, SBS Transit entered into partnership with French transit group RATP Dev for tender bids to operate the Jurong Region Line and Cross Island Line in Singapore as a joint venture. Both tenders are limited to existing rail operators in Singapore, while foreign operators will be allowed to participate as minority partners of joint ventures with existing rail operators.

On 28 November 2024, the joint venture under the submitted name SRJV, was awarded the contract at a bid of S$750 million to operate the line for nine years, with an optional two-year extension. The bid was reported to be 8 per cent lower than the competing bid made by SMRT Trains.

Singapore One Rail Pte Ltd was officially incorporated on 15 January 2025.

== Trains ==
Singapore One Rail is set to operate the Jurong Region Line (JRL) when it opens in 2028. The JRL would span 24 kilometers and consist of 24 stations in the West region of Singapore over three opening phases, serving Choa Chu Kang in the north, Jurong Pier in the south, Peng Kang Hill in the west and Pandan Reservoir in the east. An extension via West Coast on the Cross Island Line to Kent Ridge on the Circle Line, is set be completed in the 2030s to 2040s. The JRL is fully automated and driverless and consists of a fleet of 62 Hyundai Rotem J151 trainsets. The JRL would be the first in Singapore rail network to operate South Korean manufactured rolling stocks.

Name	Image	Maximum speed (km/h)		Trains built	Cars built	Cars per set	Lines served	Built	Number in service	Introduction
Name	Image	Design	Service	Trains built	Cars built	Cars per set	Lines served	Built	Number in service	Introduction
J151		70	TBA	62	186	3	Jurong Region Line	2022‍–‍2026	0	2028

- The trains are classified as contracts unlike other countries which use "class".
