= West Coast MRT station =

Future Mass Rapid Transit station in Singapore

West Coast CR18 西海岸 வெஸ்ட் கோஸ்ட்
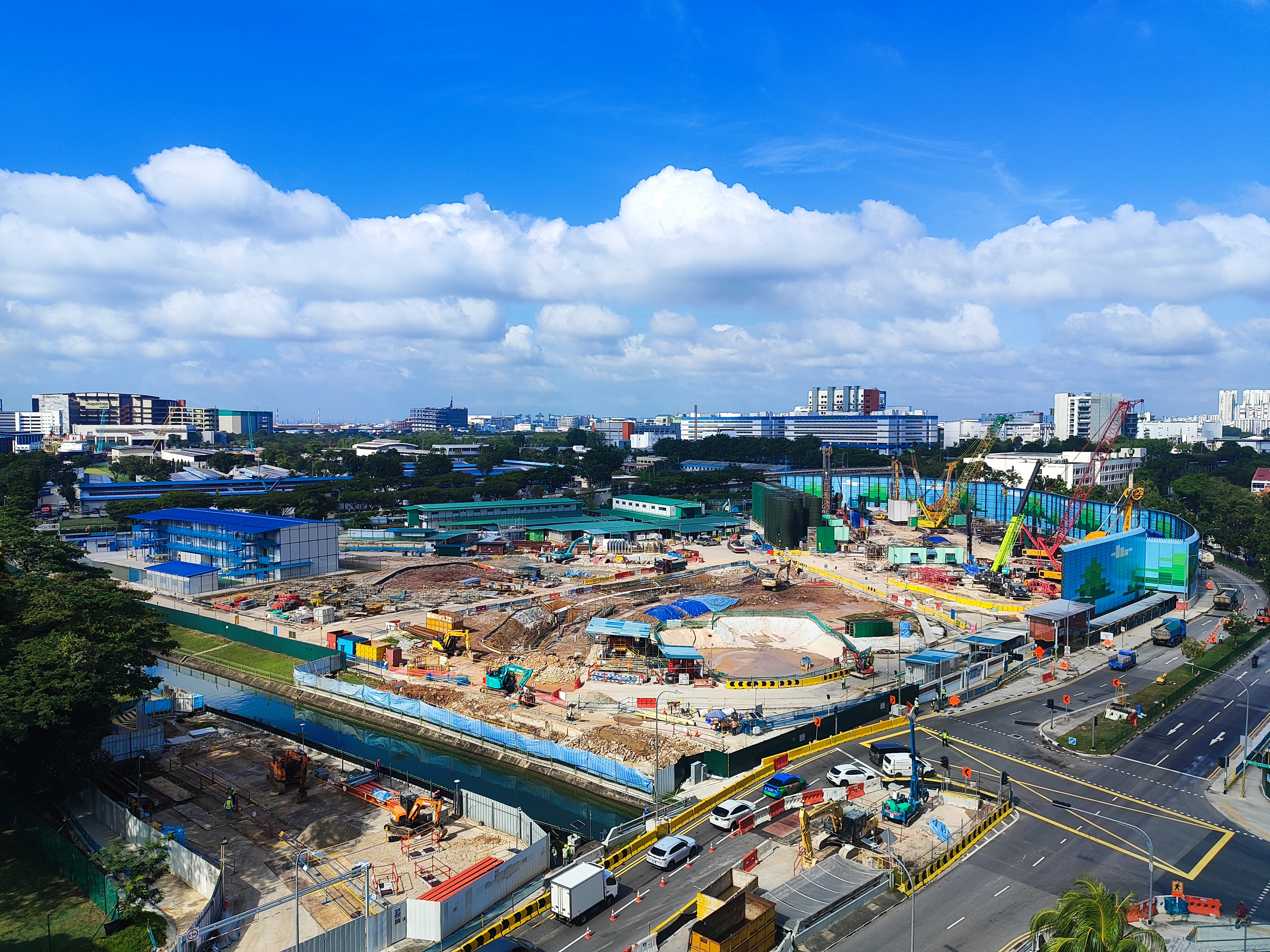
- West Coast station under construction in December 2025

General information
- Location: 301 West Coast Road
- Coordinates: 01°18′39″N 103°45′28″E
- System: Future Mass Rapid Transit (MRT) station
- Owner: Land Transport Authority
- Operator: Singapore One Rail (Jurong Region Line)
- Line: Jurong Region Line Cross Island Line
- Platforms: 2 (1 island platform)
- Connections: Bus, Taxi

Construction
- Structure type: Elevated (JRL); Underground (CRL)
- Accessible: Yes

Other information
- Station code: WSC

History
- Opening: 2032; 6 years' time (Cross Island Line)

Services
Preceding station	Mass Rapid Transit	Following station
Pandan Reservoir towards Tengah	Jurong Region Line Future service	Terminus
Pandan Reservoir towards Tengah	Jurong Region Line Future service	Kent Ridge Terminus
Clementi towards Aviation Park	Cross Island Line Future service	Jurong Lake District Terminus
Location
- Location within Singapore Rail

West Coast MRT station is a future underground Mass Rapid Transit (MRT) station on the Jurong Region Line (JRL) and Cross Island Line (CRL) located in Clementi, Singapore. It will serve West Coast Road, West Coast Highway, and West Coast Drive. First announced in September 2022, the station is expected to be completed in 2032 along with the other CRL Phase 2 stations. It is also planned to be a JRL interchange by the late 2030s.

== History ==
Artist's impression of West Coast MRT station

West Coast station was first announced on 20 September 2022 by Transport Minister S. Iswaran. The station will be constructed as part of Phase 2 of the Cross Island Line (CRL), a 15-kilometre (9.3 mi) segment spanning six stations from Turf City station to Jurong Lake District station. The station is expected to be completed in 2032.

The station will be located at the former Tanglin Secondary School, which was merged with New Town Secondary School from 2024. Two properties belonging to JTC at Pandan Loop Industrial Estate southwest of the station will be acquired for the construction of the exits. The contract for the construction of West Coast station and associated tunnels was awarded to Gamuda Singapore Branch for S$510 million (US$373.8 million) in December 2023. In June 2024, the contract for the construction of tunnels between the West Coast and Jurong Lake District stations was awarded to a joint venture between Nishimatsu Construction Co Ltd and Okumura Corporation for S$242 million (US$177.4 million).

=== Jurong Region Line interchange ===
On 5 March 2025, Transport Minister Chee Hong Tat announced West Coast station would interchange with the Jurong Region Line (JRL) as part of the first phase of the JRL West Coast extension. The first phase was planned to be completed in the late 2030s. In the early 2040s, the JRL would be extended to Kent Ridge station on the Circle Line.

== Details ==
West Coast station will serve the Cross Island Line (CRL) and have an official station code of CR18. Residents raised concerns that the station was not situated in the West Coast town centre, but Transport Minister Iswaran clarified that the site was chosen for its proximity to residential estates and future industrial developments, which would allow the station to serve both areas. A mixed-use development above the station is being planned and will be integrated with the station.
