= Kent Ridge MRT station =

Mass Rapid Transit station in Singapore

Kent Ridge CC24 肯特岗 கெண்ட் ரிஜ்
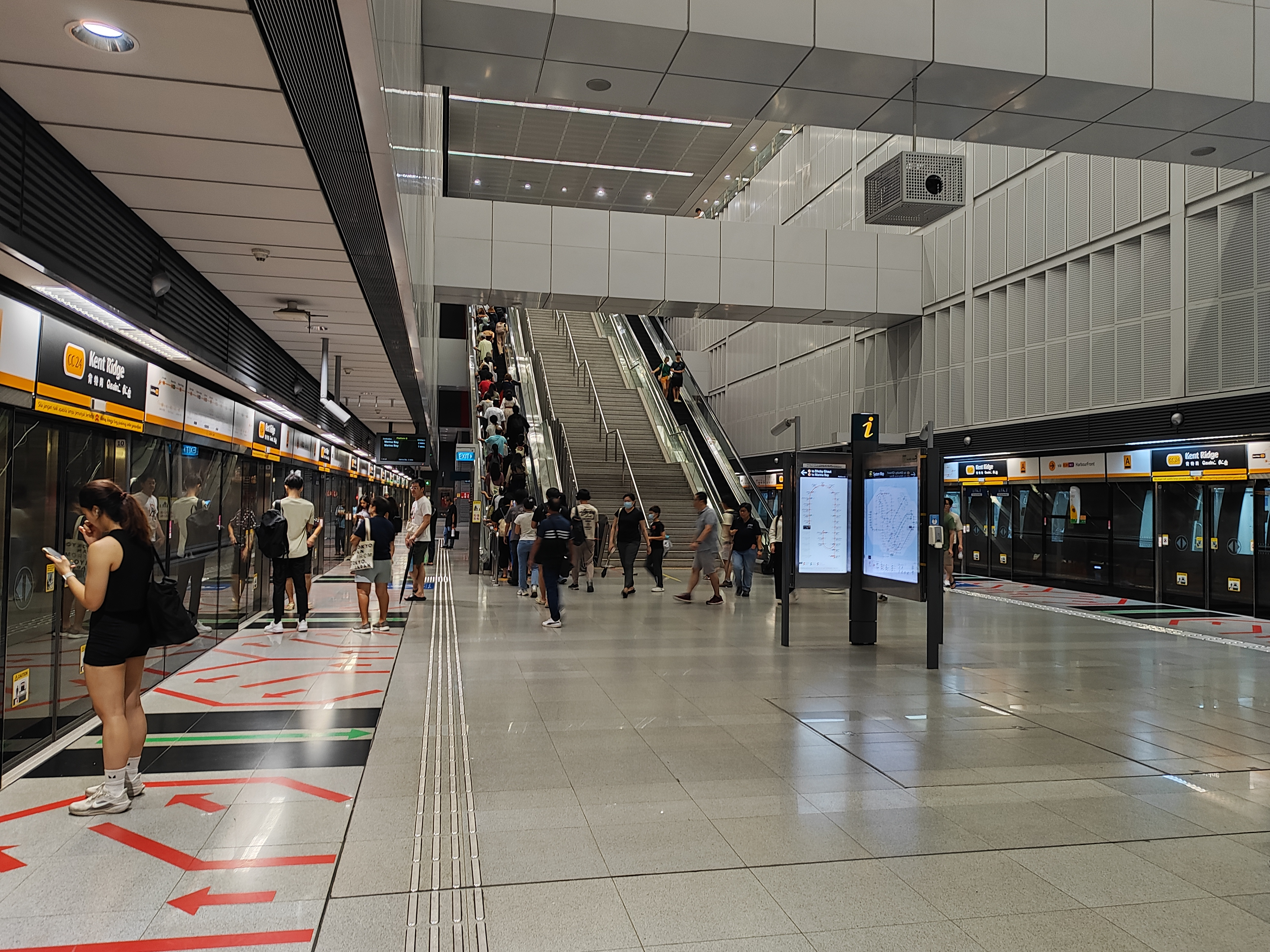
- Platform level of the station

General information
- Location: 301 South Buona Vista Road, Singapore 118177
- Coordinates: 01°17′36″N 103°47′04″E
- System: Mass Rapid Transit (MRT) station
- Owner: Land Transport Authority
- Operator: SMRT Trains (Circle Line); Singapore One Rail (Jurong Region Line)
- Line: Circle Line Jurong Region Line
- Platforms: 2 (1 island platform)
- Tracks: 2
- Connections: Bus, Taxi

Construction
- Structure type: Underground
- Platform levels: 1
- Parking: Yes (National University Hospital)
- Cycle facilities: Yes
- Accessible: Yes

Other information
- Station code: KRG

History
- Opened: 8 October 2011; 15 years ago
- Former names: National University Hospital

Passengers
- June 2024: 15,993 per day

Services
| Preceding station | Mass Rapid Transit | Following station |
|---|---|---|
| one-north Clockwise | Circle Line | Haw Par Villa Anticlockwise |
| one-north towards Dhoby Ghaut | Circle Line | Haw Par Villa towards Prince Edward Road |
| West Coast towards Tengah | Jurong Region Line Future service | Terminus |
Track layout
Location
- Location within Singapore Rail central area

Kent Ridge MRT station is an underground Mass Rapid Transit (MRT) station on the Circle Line (CCL). Located in the eponymous Kent Ridge of Queenstown, Singapore, the station is near the junction of South Buona Vista Road and Lower Kent Ridge Road. The station serves the National University Hospital and the National University of Singapore, and also the nearby commercial and residential buildings such as Ascent, Geneo and Lyndenwoods.

Initially announced as National University Hospital MRT station in 2003, the station was renamed through a public poll in 2005. Kent Ridge station opened on 8 October 2011 when Stages 4 and 5 of the CCL commenced operations. The station features Poetry Mix-Up by Mixed Reality Lab as part of the MRT network's Art-in-Transit programme. In March 2025, it was announced that the Jurong Region Line would be extended to this station as part of the second phase of the West Coast extension.

== History ==
The station was first announced as NUH station when the Circle Line (CCL) Stages 4 and 5 stations were revealed in 2003. The contract for the construction of NUH station was awarded to Woh Hup (Pte) Ltd–Shanghai Tunnel Engineering Co. Ltd–Alpine Mayreder bau GmbH (WH-STEC-AM) Joint Venture in 2004. The S$399.91 million (US$236.6 million) contract included the construction of Holland, Buona Vista and one-north stations. The construction of the 8.25-kilometre (5.13-mile) bored tunnels required the use of 6.35-metre (20.8 ft) diameter Earth pressure balance (EPB) machines.

In 2005, the station name was renamed to Kent Ridge as it reflects the broader Kent Ridge area instead of National University Hospital, stating that the "National University Hospital" name was never used for the public infrastructure. As announced by transport minister Lui Tuck Yew during his visit to the CCL4 and 5 stations on 1 August 2011, the station began revenue service on 8 October of that year.

=== JRL interchange ===
On 5 March 2025, it was announced the Jurong Region Line (JRL) would interchange with this station, and the extension was expected to be completed in the early 2040s. Previously, it was announced by transport minister Lui Tuck Yew in 2015 that the JRL would terminate at Haw Par Villa. The extension was expected to improve connections between the western part of Singapore and the Central Business District.

== Details ==
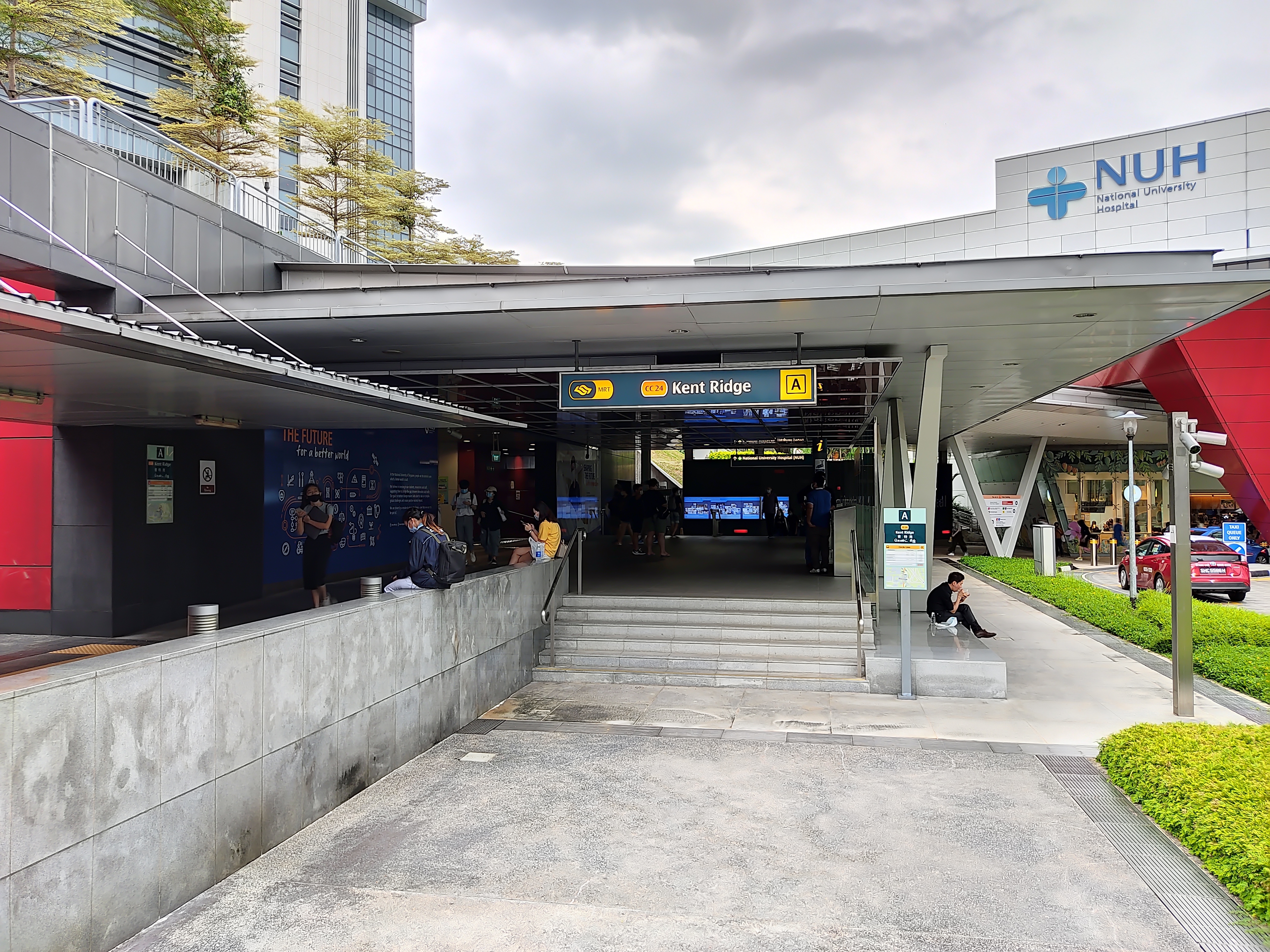
Exit A in front of NUH

Kent Ridge station serves the CCL and is between the one-north and Haw Par Villa stations. The official station code is CC24. Being part of the CCL, the station is operated by SMRT Trains. Trains runs every 5 to 7 minutes in both directions daily.

The station is located underneath the National University Hospital (NUH) Medical Centre near the junction of South Buona Vista Road and Kent Ridge Road. The station is at the east of National University of Singapore (NUS) campus. Other landmarks include Singapore Science Park I and Kent Ridge Park. The station serves NUS internal bus shuttle services that connects the station to other areas of the NUS campus.

The station is wheelchair accessible. A tactile system, consisting of tiles with rounded or elongated raised studs, guides visually impaired commuters through the station, with dedicated tactile routes that connect the station entrances to the platforms. Wider fare gates allow easier access for wheelchair users into the station.

Commissioned as part of the Art-in-Transit programme, Poetry Mix-Up is a multimedia work installed by Mixed Reality Lab of NUS and is displayed at Kent Ridge MRT station. Commuters at the station are able to generate a poem via a SMS message, which will then be displayed on a screen situated at the station's lift shaft. The artwork installation is intended to remind commuters to be more aware of their surroundings especially when using mobile devices, while at the same time aiming to revive poetic expression.
