= Jurong Pier MRT station =

Future Mass Rapid Transit station in Singapore

Jurong Pier JS12 CR21 裕廊渡头 ஜூரோங் பியர் Dermaga Jurong
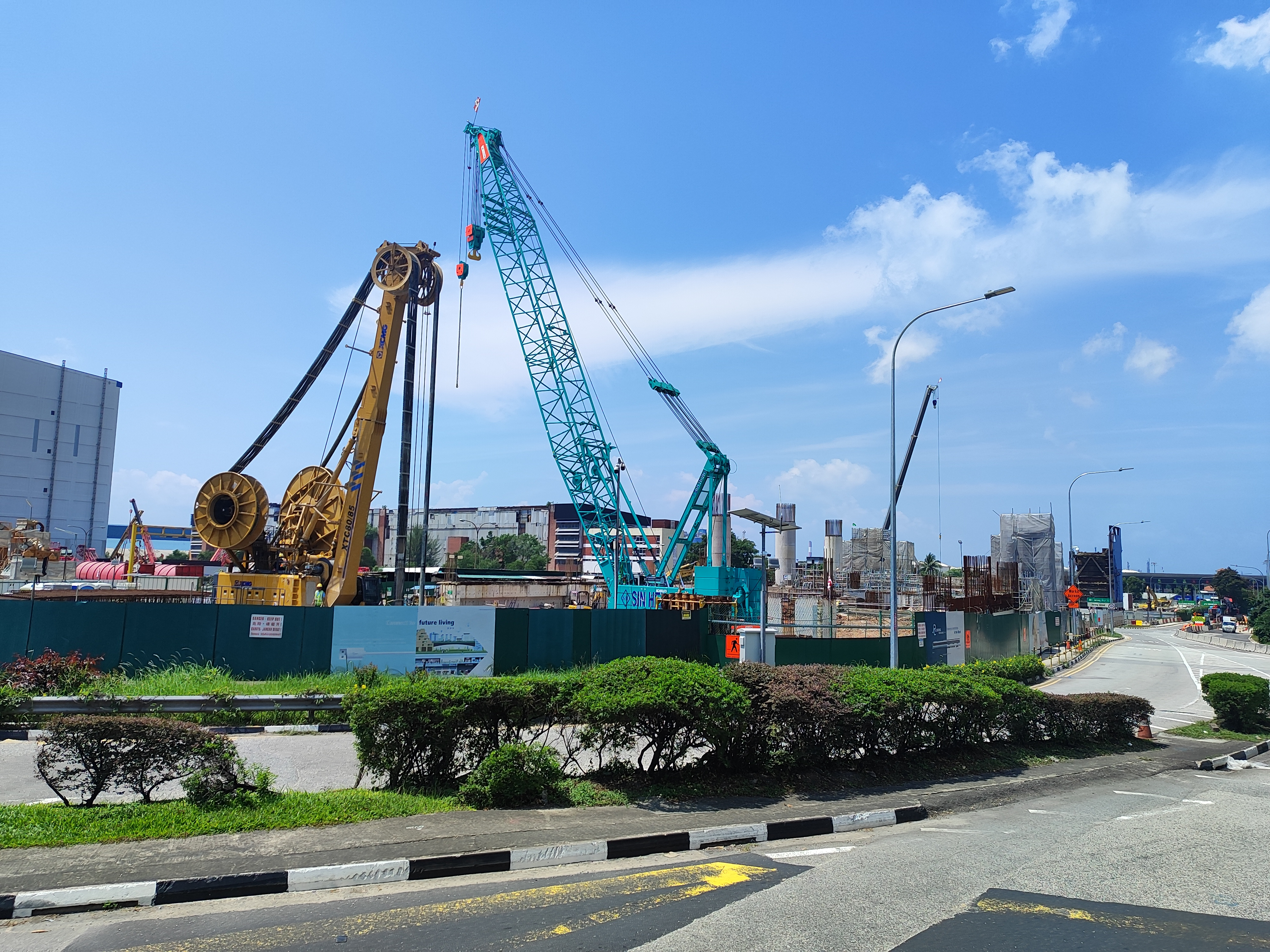
- Jurong Pier MRT station site in May 2025

General information
- Coordinates: 01°18′47″N 103°42′37″E
- System: Future Mass Rapid Transit (MRT) station
- Owner: Land Transport Authority
- Operator: Singapore One Rail
- Line: Jurong Region Line Cross Island Line
- Platforms: 2 (1 island platform)
- Tracks: 2
- Connections: Bus, Taxi

Construction
- Structure type: Elevated
- Platform levels: 1
- Parking: Yes
- Cycle facilities: Yes
- Accessible: Yes

Other information
- Station code: JRP

History
- Opening: 2029; 3 years' time (JRL) late-2030s; 13 years' time (CRL)

Services
Preceding station	Mass Rapid Transit	Following station
Jurong Hill towards Peng Kang Hill	Jurong Region Line Future service	Terminus
CR20 towards Changi Terminal 5	Cross Island Line Future service	CR22 towards Gul Circle
Location
- Location within Singapore Rail

Jurong Pier MRT station is a future Mass Rapid Transit (MRT) interchange station on the Jurong Region Line (JRL) and Cross Island Line (CRL). It is located on the boundary of Boon Lay and Jurong East planning areas in Singapore. On the JRL, the station serves as the southern terminus of the mainline from Choa Chu Kang, while trains entering service at this station will head towards Peng Kang Hill via Bahar Junction.

First announced in May 2018, the station is expected to be completed in 2029 as part of JRL Stage 3. It is planned to become an interchange with the CRL in the late 2030s.

== History ==
=== Jurong Region Line ===
On 9 May 2018, the Land Transport Authority (LTA) announced that Jurong Pier station would be part of the proposed JRL. The station will be constructed as part of Phase 3, consisting of 7 stations – a 4 station extension to this station from Boon Lay and a 3 station extension to Peng Kang Hill from Tawas. It was expected to be completed in 2028. However, the restrictions on construction due to the COVID-19 pandemic has led to delays, with the completion date pushed to 2029.

The contract for the design and construction of the Jurong Hill and Jurong Pier stations and 1.1 km (0.68 miles) of associated viaducts – Contract J112 – was awarded to a joint venture between China Civil Engineering Construction Corporation (Singapore Branch) (CCECC) and SCB Building Construction Pte Ltd at S$263 million (US$192.79 million) on 6 April 2021.

=== Cross Island Line ===
On 31 July 2026, transport minister Jeffrey Siow announced that this station will interchange with the Cross Island Line (CRL), as part of Phase 3 of the line. The CRL station is expected to be completed by the late 2030s.

== Station details ==
The station will serve the Jurong Region Line (JRL) as the southern terminus of the main route, with the preceding station being Jurong Hill. The official station code will be JS12. Jurong Pier station will be situated along Jurong Pier Road, next to the Jurong Pier Circus and Jurong Pier Flyover. The station is planned to have three entrances.
