= Peng Kang Hill MRT station =

Future Mass Rapid Transit station in Singapore

Peng Kang Hill JW5 秉光山 பெங் காங் ஹில்
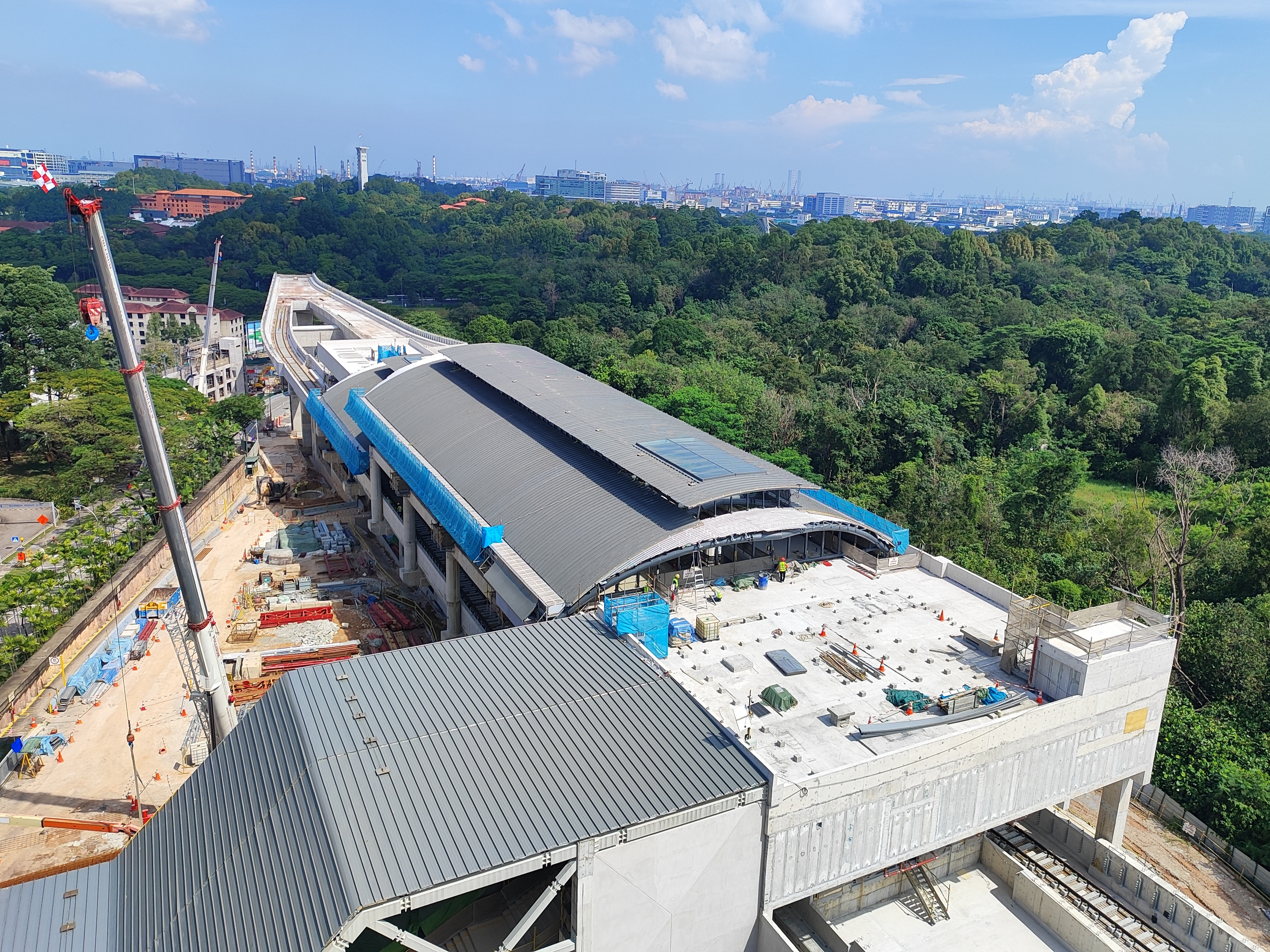
- Construction site of the station in June 2026

General information
- Location: 57 Nanyang Drive, Singapore 639943
- Coordinates: 01°20′36″N 103°40′43″E
- System: Future Mass Rapid Transit (MRT) station
- Owner: Land Transport Authority
- Operator: Singapore One Rail
- Line: Jurong Region Line
- Platforms: 2 (1 island platform)
- Tracks: 2
- Connections: Bus, Taxi

Construction
- Structure type: Elevated
- Platform levels: 1
- Parking: Yes
- Cycle facilities: Yes
- Accessible: Yes

Other information
- Station code: PKH

History
- Opening: 2029; 3 years' time

Services
Preceding station	Mass Rapid Transit	Following station
Nanyang Crescent towards Choa Chu Kang	Jurong Region Line Future service	Terminus
Track layout
Location
- Location within Singapore Rail

Peng Kang Hill MRT station is a future elevated Mass Rapid Transit (MRT) station on the Jurong Region Line in Western Water Catchment, Singapore.

It will be the terminus of the West Branch of the Jurong Region line. Trains entering service at this station will terminate at Choa Chu Kang via Bahar Junction.

== History ==
On 9 May 2018, LTA announced that Peng Kang Hill station would be part of the proposed Jurong Region line (JRL). The station will be constructed as part of Phase 3, consisting of a total of 7 stations. A 4-station extension to Jurong Pier at Boon Lay and a 3 station extension to Peng Kang Hill from Tawas. It is expected to be completed in 2029.

This station was named after the nearby Peng Kang Hill, in the SAFTI Live Firing Area.

Contract J115A for the design and construction of Peng Kang Hill Station and associated viaducts was awarded to Hwa Seng Builder Pte Ltd at a sum of S$148 million. Construction will start in 3Q 2022, with completion in 2029. Previously, the station was to be built under contract J115 which also included the design and construction of a stabling facility next to the station and associated viaducts.

Initially expected to open in 2028, the restrictions on the construction due to the COVID-19 pandemic has led to delays in the JRL line completion, and the date was pushed to 2029.

== Location ==
The station complex will be straddled over the existing Nanyang Drive, north of the junction with Peng Kang Avenue and Nanyang Link in Nanyang Technological University (NTU). It is located in the Western Water Catchment planning area, serving the Lee Kong Chian School of Medicine (Yunnan Garden Campus), Wee Kim Wee School of Communication and Information, and School of Electrical and Electronics Engineering.

== Exits ==
Access to the station will be via 3 exits along Nanyang Drive, each to the following destinations:

- Exit: Experimental Medicine Building, Lee Kong Chian School of Medicine (Yunnan Gardens Campus), School of Biological Sciences, Nanyang Drive
- Exit: Nanyang Auditorium, Research Techno Plaza, School of Electrical and Computer Engineering, Wee Kim Wee School of Communications and Information, Nanyang Drive, Nanyang Link
- Exit: SAFTI Live Firing Area, Nanyang Drive, Peng Kang Avenue
