= JW3 (disambiguation) =

JW3 or variation, may refer to:

- JW3, the Jewish Community Centre London
- Nanyang Gateway MRT station (station code: JW3) Singapore mass rapid transit station
- ACA JW-3, the ACA Industries aircraft model JW-3, see List of aircraft (0–Ah)
- Honda Today model JW3, a Japanese kei car
- Jurassic World Dominion, the sequel to Jurassic World: Fallen Kingdom, sixth film in the Jurassic Park film series
- John Wick: Chapter 3 – Parabellum, third film in the John Wick series

== See also ==
- J3W, see List of postal codes of Canada: J
- JW (disambiguation)
