= Jw2 =

jw2 or variation, may refer to:

- Tawas MRT station (station code: JW2) Singapore mass rapid transit station
- ACA JW-2, the ACA Industries aircraft model JW-2, see List of aircraft (0–Ah)
- Honda Today model JW2, a Japanese kei car
- John Wick: Chapter 2, 2017 film
- Jurassic World: Fallen Kingdom, 2018 film

== See also ==
- J2W, see List of postal codes of Canada: J
- JW (disambiguation)
