= Western Water Catchment =

Planning area in Singapore

- Planning Area

Other transcription(s)
  - Chinese: 西部集水区 (Simplified) 西部集水區 (Traditional); Xībù Jíshuǐqū (Pinyin); Se-pō͘ Chi̍p-chúi-khu (Hokkien POJ)
  - Malay: Kawasan Tadahan Air Barat (Rumi) کاوسن تادهن اءير بارت (Jawi)
  - Tamil: மேற்கத்திய நீர் நீர்ப்பிடிப்பு Mēṟkattiya nīr nīrppiṭippu (Transliteration)
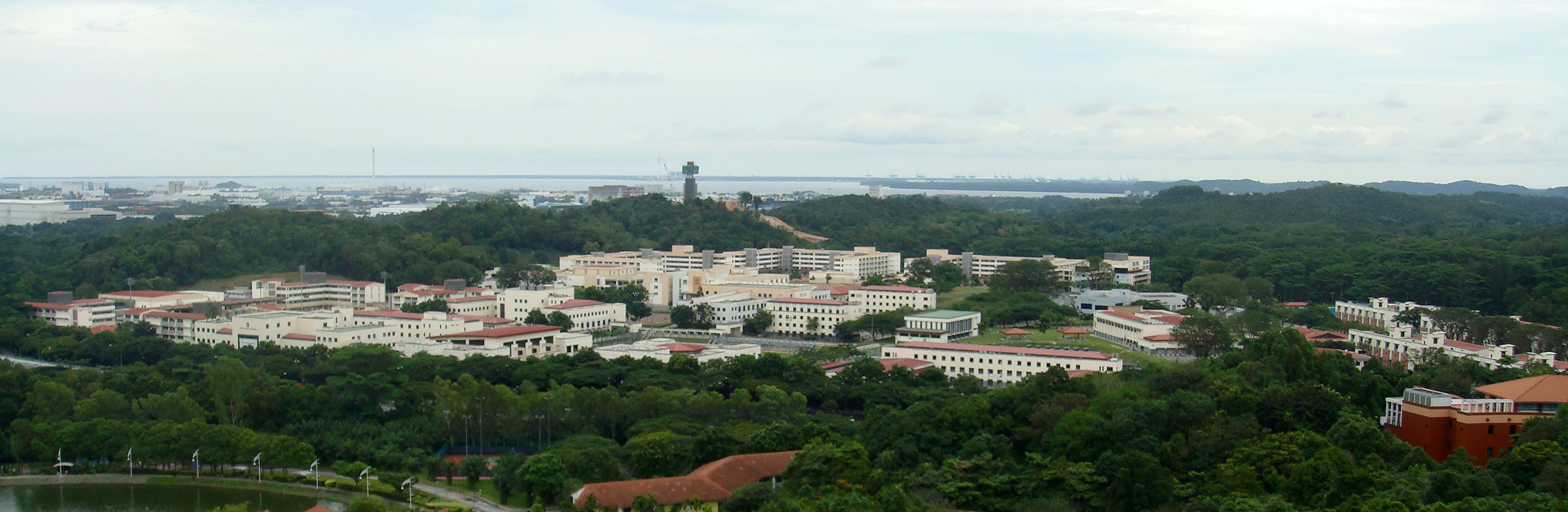
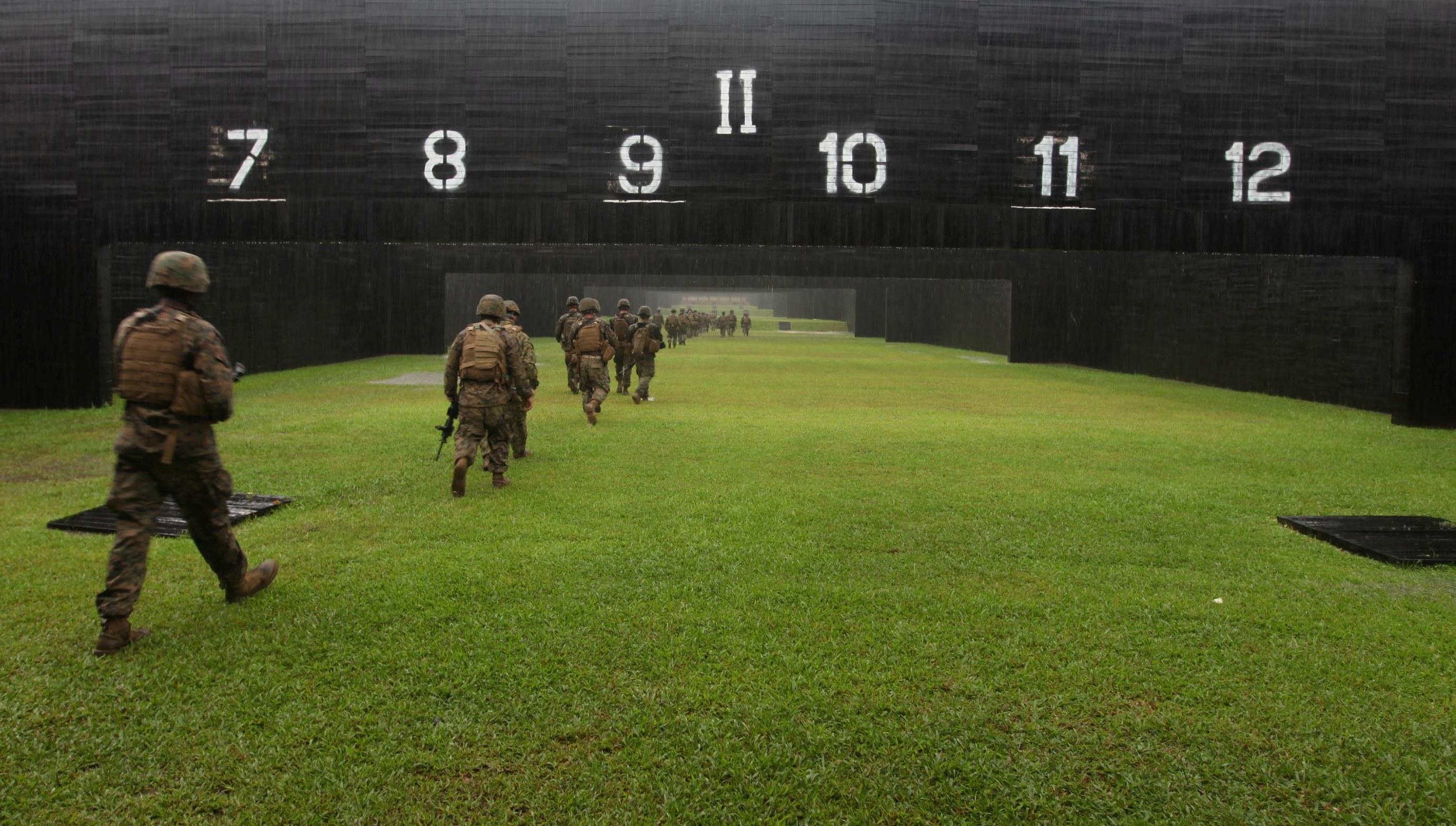
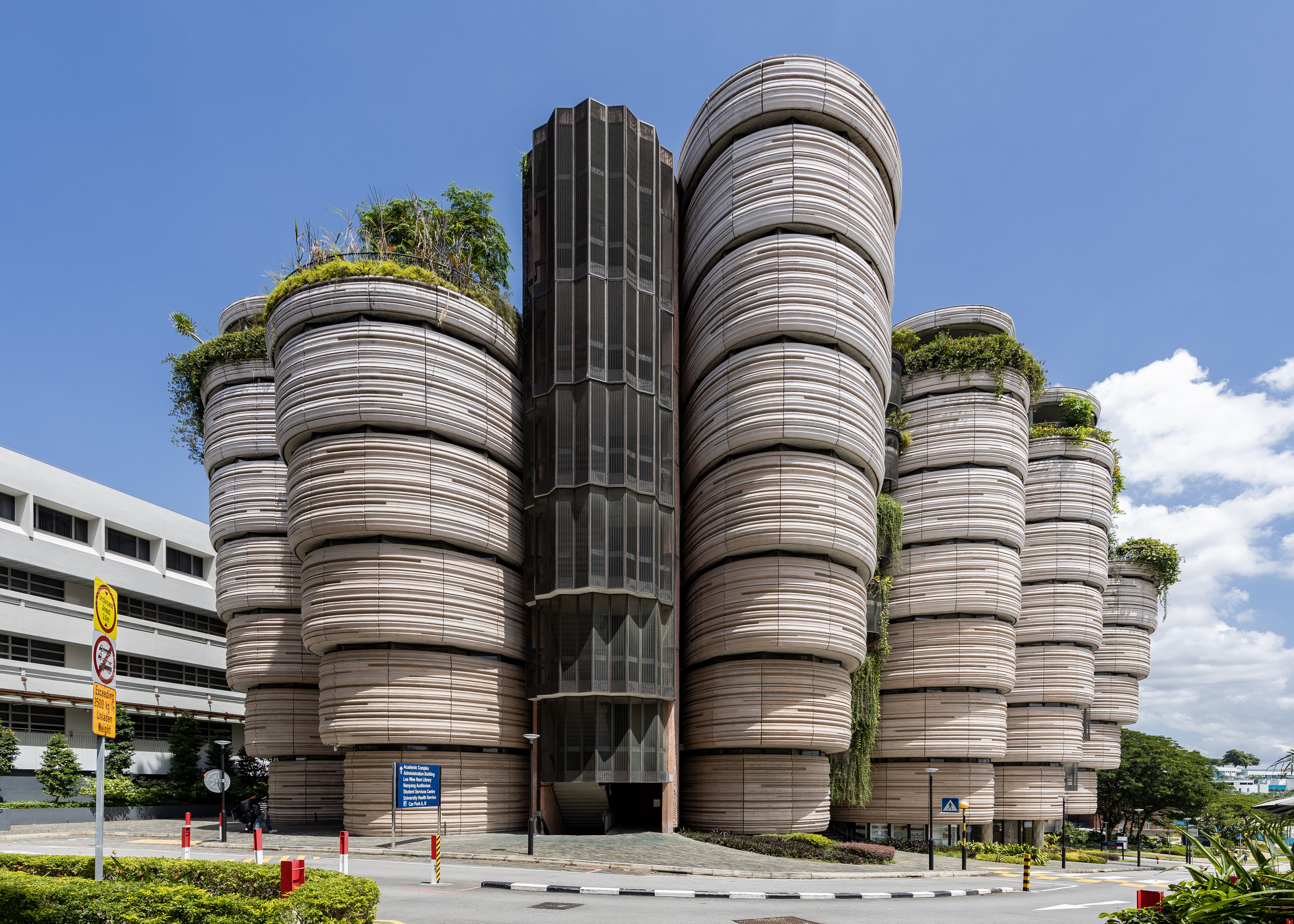
- From top to bottom: An overview of Pasir Laba Camp, soldiers at the Murai Urban Training Facility, The Hive building at Nanyang Technological University

- Location of Western Water Catchment in Singapore

- Location in Singapore
- Coordinates: 1.387°N 103.692°E
- Country: Singapore
- Region: West Region
- CDC: South West CDC
- Town councils: Chua Chu Kang Town Council
- Constituencies: Chua Chu Kang GRC

Government
  - Mayor: South West CDC: Low Yen Ling
  - Members of Parliament: Chua Chu Kang GRC: Zhulkarnain Abdul Rahim; West Coast-Jurong West GRC: Ang Wei Neng; Cassandra Lee

Area
  - Total: 69.7 km^{2} (26.9 sq mi)
  - Rank: 1st

Population (2026)
  - Total: 590
  - Rank: 41st
  - Density: 8.5/km^{2} (22/sq mi)
  - Rank: 42nd
- Postal districts: 22, 23, 24
- Postal sectors: 63, 64, 68–71

The Western Water Catchment is a planning area in the West Region of Singapore. It is bordered by Lim Chu Kang to the north, Tuas and Pioneer to the south, Sungei Kadut, Choa Chu Kang, Tengah and Jurong West to the east, and the Straits of Johor to the west.

The Western Water Catchment is the largest planning area in Singapore by land area, covering about 70 km^{2} (27 sq mi). It contains four reservoirs—Tengeh Reservoir, Poyan Reservoir, Murai Reservoir and Sarimbun Reservoir—and forms one of Singapore's two main water catchment areas, together with the Central Water Catchment.

The planning area is sparsely populated and is used largely for military training and water catchment purposes. A significant part of the area is occupied by the SAFTI Live Firing Area, which is used by the Singapore Armed Forces for live-firing exercises and other training activities.

== History ==
The Western Water Catchment has a military past with the Pasir Laba area being used as the Pasir Laba Battery for the defence of Singapore. The battery was involved in the defence of Singapore during World War II and was subsequently destroyed by the British forces to deny usage of it by the Japanese army.

After World War II, squatter settlements moved in around Pasir Laba Road. In the 1960s, these squatter settlements were removed by the government so that a military camp, Singapore Armed Forces Training Institute (SAFTI), could be constructed for the Singapore Armed Forces (SAF) to use as a training and live firing ground. On 18 June 1966, SAFTI was officially opened.

In 1980, other military units were moved to the SAFTI premise but only the Officer Cadet School was allowed to use the name "SAFTI" for its location while the other units were based in Pasir Laba Camp. On 31 May 1986, Pasir Laba Camp was renamed SAFTI. In June 1995, when the Officer Cadet School moved to a new complex, the SAFTI Military Institute, at Upper Jurong Road, the camp was reverted to its old name as Pasir Laba Camp.

Date	Event
1967	Drawing out of SAFTI Live Firing Area, and before this date, most residents and occupants living within the affected boundaries were shifted to Boon Lay as its pioneer residents and factories there were relocated to the Jurong Industrial Area, leaving only a few villages behind. There are 504 warning signs in the vicinity.
14 July 1968	Four villagers died and nine others were injured in the live-firing area (near Kampong Berih, one of many rural villages in the area) and seven other villagers snuck into Pasir Laba (on the coastline of the Johor Straits) by sampans to pick durians and rambutans from the many fruit trees in the forest there. These villagers were injured by mortar rounds in their attempt to collect fruits. There are many cases of trespassers in the live firing area.
1970s	Demolition of Pasir Laba Battery, located at Wrexham and Bajau area. Several of the WWII gun battery historical remains were seen at the junction of Wrexham Drive and Wrexham Road.
1994	Remaining villages behind such as Kampong Berih and Chua Chu Kang Village were all gone.
July 2022	TRMC has put up additional sign depicting "No Unauthorised Photography or Filming" under the Infrastructure Protection Act.
November 2024	TRMC has put up the new generation of Live Firing Area sign depicting "Force May Be Used - No Entry Beyond This Sign" and instead of deadly skull and crossbone, a toxic substance was used instead to deter trespassers, and the yellow extra instruction sign saying "Do Not Go Beyond This Point - Live Firing Area: KEEP CLEAR" was briefly replaced by "Trespassers Will Be Handed to the Police".

== Districts ==
There are 21 districts in Western Water Catchment. Except for Cleantech, Murai North, Nanyang Bridge, Nanyang Crescent, Nanyang Gateway and part of Peng Kang Hill (NTU), visiting to these districts and unauthorised photography or filming in these districts is not allowed by law. Deadly force may be used against trespassers, security guard or military gate warden will ask trespassers to leave, if not police will be called.

1. Ama Keng
2. Bahtera
3. Bajau
4. Cleantech
5. Jalan Bahar
6. Kapal
7. Kranji Camp
8. Lorong Danau
9. Murai
10. Murai North (Opened from 10 January 2025)
11. Nanyang Bridge
12. Nanyang Crescent
13. Nanyang Gateway
14. Pasir Laba
15. Peng Kang Hill
16. Poyan
17. Safti City
18. Sarimbun
19. Sungei Gedong
20. Thousand Oaks
21. Wrexham

== Infrastructure ==
=== Military ===
There are seven main military bases in the Western Water Catchment. These include Pasir Laba Camp, Choa Chu Kang Camp at Lorong Danau (where the RSAF's 201 Squadron is based; it has Fighter control, SAM control, Surveillance and ASP), Sungei Gedong Camp (HQ Armour), Kranji Camp II & III, Mowbray Camp (SAF MP Command) and Tengah Air Base. A military aerostat, widely referred to as a blimp locally, is tethered to the ground at Choa Chu Kang Camp as part of testing for use as long-range air defence radar in Singapore. Additionally, there are various live-firing ranges in the Western Water Catchment; these include the Multi-Mission Range Complex, MATADOR Range, M203 Range, several SAFTI ranges and the Poyan 300m Range.

The SAFTI City Urban Training Facility, located in Old Choa Chu Kang Road, was officially opened on 19 March 2025. It was operational since October 2024. The facility simulates a densely built-up town with an integrated transport hub and has a training area for island defence scenarios. The facility has three decommissioned MRT trains, two decommissioned buses, two decommissioned taxis, offices, hospitals and residential buildings.

Half of the Western Water Catchment lies within the SAFTI Live Firing Area boundary. The boundary is within Bahtera Track, Lim Chu Kang Road, New Lim Chu Kang Road, Jalan Bahar, Nanyang Avenue, Nanyang Crescent, Nanyang Drive, PIE, Singapore Rail Test Centre, Tengeh Reservoir and Straits of Johor.

In the Murai area, there are more military training areas which are the Murai Urban Live Firing Facility (MULFAC), Murai Urban Training Facility (MUTF) and MEXCON. These will be affected under the proposed Lim Chu Kang Road realignment project for the expanded Tengah Air Base, along with the construction of the new SAFTI City Urban Training Facility. The facility was located within an existing training area in Lim Chu Kang, in the vicinity of Jalan Murai. The MUTF is built to resemble a typical town, and has features such as single-level houses; a commercial district comprising multi-function, multi-storey buildings; a residential district; as well as an industrial district. The MUTF was permanently closed in 26 August 2022 to be given for the construction of the new Lim Chu Kang Road and Tengah Airbase, with training being shifted to SAFTI City.

Since 8 June 2025, the SAFTI Live Firing Area (North) and SAFTI Live Firing Area (South) were renamed into Training Plot "L", Training Plot "M" and Training Plot "P" respectively. The SAFTI City acts as a central division between Training Plot P and Training Plot M. The move is to provide more consistent naming in line with all military training plots designated by law, and even the Central Water Catchment's live firing plots such as Woodcutters Trail, Nee Soon and Mandai Ranges were also given Training Plot "C" respectively.

==== Tengah Air Base ====
Tengah Air Base is a military airbase of the Republic of Singapore Air Force (RSAF) and is the most significant airfield operated by the RSAF, as it hosts the bulk of its fixed wing frontline squadrons. The base is home to most of the RSAF's airborne early warning and control (AEWC) assets, its F-16C/D Fighting Falcons as well as a large proportion of its UAVs.

Before Singapore's independence, the site operated as a flying Royal Air Force station known as RAF Tengah. The base is currently undergoing expansion to accommodate additional aircraft, equipment and infrastructure following the planned full decommissioning of Paya Lebar Airbase in the 2030s.

=== Home Team Academy ===
Western Water Catchment houses the Home Team Academy (HTA), which is located along Old Choa Chu Kang Road, and the Civil Defence Academy (CDA), which is located along Jalan Bahar, next to the Muslim cemetery. The SPF ProCom (Protective Security Command) camp is located at Mowbray road, adjacent to the SAF Mowbray Camp.

=== Education ===
Western Water Catchment houses the main campus of Nanyang Technological University and National Institute of Education, located at the boundary with Jurong West.

=== Cemetery ===
Western Water Catchment houses the Choa Chu Kang Cemetery, which is the largest cemetery in Singapore. It is located at the junction of the Old Choa Chu Kang Road, Lim Chu Kang Road and Jalan Bahar. Within its grounds, are several columbaria, including the state-run Choa Chu Kang Columbarium, and two private facilities, namely The Garden of Remembrance, a Christian columbarium and Ji Le Memorial Park, a Buddhist facility.

== Reservoirs ==
This water catchment has 4 reservoirs. There are two road connections to connect reservoirs – Wrexham Road from Jalan Ahmad Ibrahim to Wrexham Avenue for connecting via Tengeh Reservoir, and Lim Chu Kang Coast Road to cross via Poyan Reservoir, Murai Reservoir, Sarimbun Reservoir and ending at Jalan Kapal.

=== Tengeh Reservoir ===
Tengeh Reservoir
- Location within Singapore
- Location: Western Water Catchment
- Coordinates: 1°20′45″N 103°38′50″E
- Type: reservoir
- Basin countries: Singapore

Tengeh Reservoir (Malay: Tadahan Air Tengeh; Chinese: 登格蓄水池) was formerly a river, Sungei Tengeh, which emptied into the Straits of Johor and was dammed to become a reservoir in the early 1980s (which is part of Western Water Catchment Scheme). It is located at Wrexham and Bajau districts. Construction of the reservoir began on 11 March 1977.

Tengeh Reservoir is part of the SAFTI Live Firing Area (South), now known as Training Plot P from 8 June 2025 and has restricted access since 19 January 1992. It is accessible from the side road of Jalan Ahmad Ibrahim called Wrexham Road and running through the Wrexham Bridge via TRMC Gate A. It is also accessible from another side road of PIE/Upper Jurong Road called Pasir Laba Road and running through the Wrexham Drive via TRMC Gate B. In 1993, MINDEF, Singapore Immigration and Public Works Department had constructed Wrexham Bridge to allow primary shortcut for military vehicles to enter via TRMC Gate A while retaining the flexibility of vehicles entering the side road for MediaCorp Tuas TV World (renamed to Police Tactical Training Village before being demolished in 2024) and Sembcorp Tuas Floating Farm. It was completed on 15 December 1997. The Wrexham Bridge is a suspension bridge.

The southern side of Tengeh Reservoir is the Raffles Country Club, and the golf areas can see the reservoir clearly. The Raffles Country Club construction began on 29 October 1987. The government of Singapore has made the second large acquisition of land for the project by requiring Raffles Country Club to vacate its plot as the site offers the "most suitable location" to run the HSR tracks after the bridge crossing and to place the tunnel portal leading to the tunnels that would take the HSR to the Jurong East terminus. The site has to be vacated by July 31, 2018, to be used for HSR crossover tracks and a siding facility to temporarily house a train near the border for safety or operational reasons. It is renamed to Singapore Rail Test Centre, the northern perimeter is called Peng Kang View from May 2024. Peng Kang View also has built a new Instrumented Battle Circuit (IBAC).

On 3 November 2011, Public Utilities Board and Economic Development Board decided to install floating solar panels at Tengeh Reservoir, which is part of S$11 million project. The 60 MW facility became operational in July 2021.

=== Poyan Reservoir ===
Poyan Reservoir
- Location within Singapore
- Location: Western Water Catchment
- Coordinates: 1°22′37″N 103°39′50″E
- Type: reservoir
- Basin countries: Singapore

Poyan Reservoir (Malay: Tadahan Air Poyan; Chinese: 波扬蓄水池) was previously part of the river Sungei Poyan and its delta, which was dammed to become a reservoir. Sungei Poyan emptied into the Straits of Johor. It is located in SAFTI City, Poyan and Bajau districts. Construction of the reservoir began on 11 March 1977.

At the same year, Mediacorp has filmed the drama "Behind Bars" (Season 1 Episode 28) at that location, the Poyan Temple was there, as "Temple Hill". However, at that location, there is a cash train visible at the location since 2007 and three additional Kawasaki Heavy Industries C151 trains (003/004, C751B 321/322 and 345/346) were added since 2023.

It is part of SAFTI Live Firing Area (South), now known as Training Plot P since 8 June 2025, which has restricted access and is accessible from TRMC Gate E, Gate F, Gate G, Gate H and Gate I. In April 2019, some of the roads at Poyan Reservoir were also named - Poyan Drive, Poyan Avenue, SAFTI City Avenue and Danau Grove. The road name, Jalan Sungei Poyan still exists for a short section from Danau Grove to Old Choa Chu Kang Road, but the remaining section of Jalan Sungei Poyan was renamed to Poyan Drive, which connects to Pasir Laba Avenue at the Multi-Mission Range Complex. Lorong Danau was eventually amended to link towards the Gate E on 8 June 2025 while Danau Grove took over the northern portion of Lorong Danau from Chua Chu Kang Camp to Jalan Sungei Poyan.

At the reservoir, only the Mobility 3rd Generation raft is deployed to load and unload military vehicles when crossing from the western side to the eastern side.

=== Murai Reservoir ===
Murai Reservoir
- Location within Singapore
- Location: Western Water Catchment
- Coordinates: 1°24′00″N 103°40′25″E
- Type: reservoir
- Basin countries: Singapore

Murai Reservoir (Malay: Tadahan Air Murai; Chinese: 慕莱蓄水池; pinyin: Mù lái xù shuǐ chí) was formerly Sungei Murai, which was dammed in early 1980s, to create a reservoir. It is located in Murai, Murai North and Thousand Oaks districts. Construction work had begun in November 1977.

It is part of SAFTI Live Firing Area (North), now known as Training Plot M, of which is restricted to only from the TRMC Operations Room and accessible from Gate J and Gate K. The Murai IBAC (Instrumented Battle Circuit) is west of Murai Reservoir, which can be accessed through Jalan Murai from New Lim Chu Kang Road at TRMC Gate J, together with the Murai Urban Live Firing Facility (MULFF).

There is also a road east of Murai Urban Training Facility which goes from Lim Chu Kang Road to Jalan Murai, called Murai Farmway and was expunged since the COVID-19 pandemic. Access to the area and the reservoir has been restricted since October 1999. Murai North and Thousand Oaks had four dirt roads named - Lim Chu Kang Track 11 and Track 13, most of it were expunged by December 2023 and only Track 13 was renamed to Thousand Oaks Avenue. Also, with the opening of New Lim Chu Kang Road from 8 June 2025, even the road - Jalan Murai was expunged and the remaining parts in the SAFTI LFA were renamed to Murai South Lane and Murai North Drive. Lorong Melukut and Lorong Puyoh is renamed to Oakville Road and Oakville Park Street respectively for modern military reasons as it is still within the restricted Thousand Oaks area but the Murai North is already acquired for the Tengah Air Base extension.

=== Sarimbun Reservoir ===
Sarimbun Reservoir
- Location within Singapore
- Location: Western Water Catchment
- Coordinates: 1°25′35″N 103°41′00″E
- Type: reservoir
- Basin countries: Singapore

Sarimbun Reservoir (Malay: Tadahan Air Sarimbun; Chinese: 莎琳汶蓄水池) was constructed by damming Sungei Sarimbun and widening of Sungei Karang, Sungei Hantu, and Sungei Sarimbun. It is located in Sarimbun, Sungei Gedong, Bahtera and Kapal districts. Construction work began in November 1977.

It is part of SAFTI Live Firing Area in the north, now Training Plot M, which has restricted access since 19 January 1992 and only accessible through the TRMC Operations Room. The gate is accessible through the road named Jalan Bahtera and is called TRMC Gate P and Gate Q. The public can cut through from Bahtera Track to enter Sarimbun Reservoir area.

Sarimbun was where General Tomoyuki Yamashita landed his troops during World War II, and was engaged in the Battle of Sarimbun Beach. Sarimbun is also home to many small vegetable and fruit farms and health farms. Sarimbun also hosts multiple permanent campsites, especially on Jalan Bahtera. These campsites include the Singapore Scout Association's Sarimbun Campsite, Girl Guides Singapore's Camp Christine, and Ministry of Education's Jalan Bahtera Adventure Centre. These will be closed down by 2032 and will be replaced by expanded SAFTI Live Firing Area.

==== Etymology ====
Sarimbun is a Malay place name, and existed probably since the early nineteenth century. The Franklin and Jackson's Plan of Singapore (1830) refers to Sungei Sarimbun, or Sarimbun River in Malay, as "Serimhone".

Rimbun means "luxuriant", "in great quantity" or "thick".

Other place names with Sarimbun include Pulau Sarimbun, a small island in the Straits of Johor off the coast at Sarimbun. Pulau Sarimbun is within the SAFTI Live Firing Area as shown in the map.

== Islands ==
There are three islands in the Western Water Catchment - Pulau Bajau, Pulau Pergam and Pulau Sarimbun. Pulau Bajau is a hypsographic island within Poyan Reservoir. It is part of the SAFTI live firing area.

For Pulau Bajau, it is part of Training Plot P, out of which it is primarily used for TRMC's small craft and amphibious training purposes. For Pulau Pergam and Pulau Sarimbun, it is part of Training Plot M, which is the northern part of SAFTI Live Firing Area.

=== Etymology ===
Pulau Bajau means Bajau island, in which Bajau is an indigenous ethnic group residing in the state of Sabah in east Malaysia, Indonesia and southern Philippines.

== Transport ==
On 8 June 2025, Lim Chu Kang Road was closed for the expansion of Tengah Air Base. It was replaced by a new stretch of Lim Chu Kang Road further west.

=== Bus ===
Western Water Catchment Area has very few public bus connections in the vicinity – 172, 179, 199, 405 and 975. All buses are operated by SMRT Buses.

- 172, which operates between Choa Chu Kang and Boon Lay interchanges, serves the military and Home Team installations along Jalan Bahar and Old Choa Chu Kang Road.
- 179 and 199 operates from Boon Lay Bus Interchange and provides bus connections between NTU and nearby MRT stations, Boon Lay and Pioneer.
- 405, which operates from Boon Lay Interchange, and provides connectivity to Choa Chu Kang Cemetery and direct connectivity to SAFTI City [Bus Stop 31009 is renamed to bef SAFTI City as a result, previously bef Jln Sungei Poyan, and u-turn immediately before the entrance to SAFTI City]
- 975, which operates from Bukit Panjang Interchange, via Choa Chu Kang, also goes through the Old Choa Chu Kang Road, Choa Chu Kang Cemetery, New Lim Chu Kang Road and Lim Chu Kang Road, terminating at Lim Chu Kang Road End.

Besides public bus services, NTU internal campus shuttle buses provide a free alternative to public buses for commutes between Pioneer MRT station and NTU as well as within the campus.

=== MRT ===
There are currently no operational MRT stations within Western Water Catchment. Tawas, Nanyang Gateway, Nanyang Crescent and Peng Kang Hill stations of the upcoming Jurong Region line (JRL) are currently under construction and will be completed by 2029. These stations will improve accessibility between NTU, CleanTech Park and Jurong West.
