= Hong Kah MRT station =

Future Mass Rapid Transit station in Singapore

Hong Kah JS4 丰加 ஹோங் காஹ்
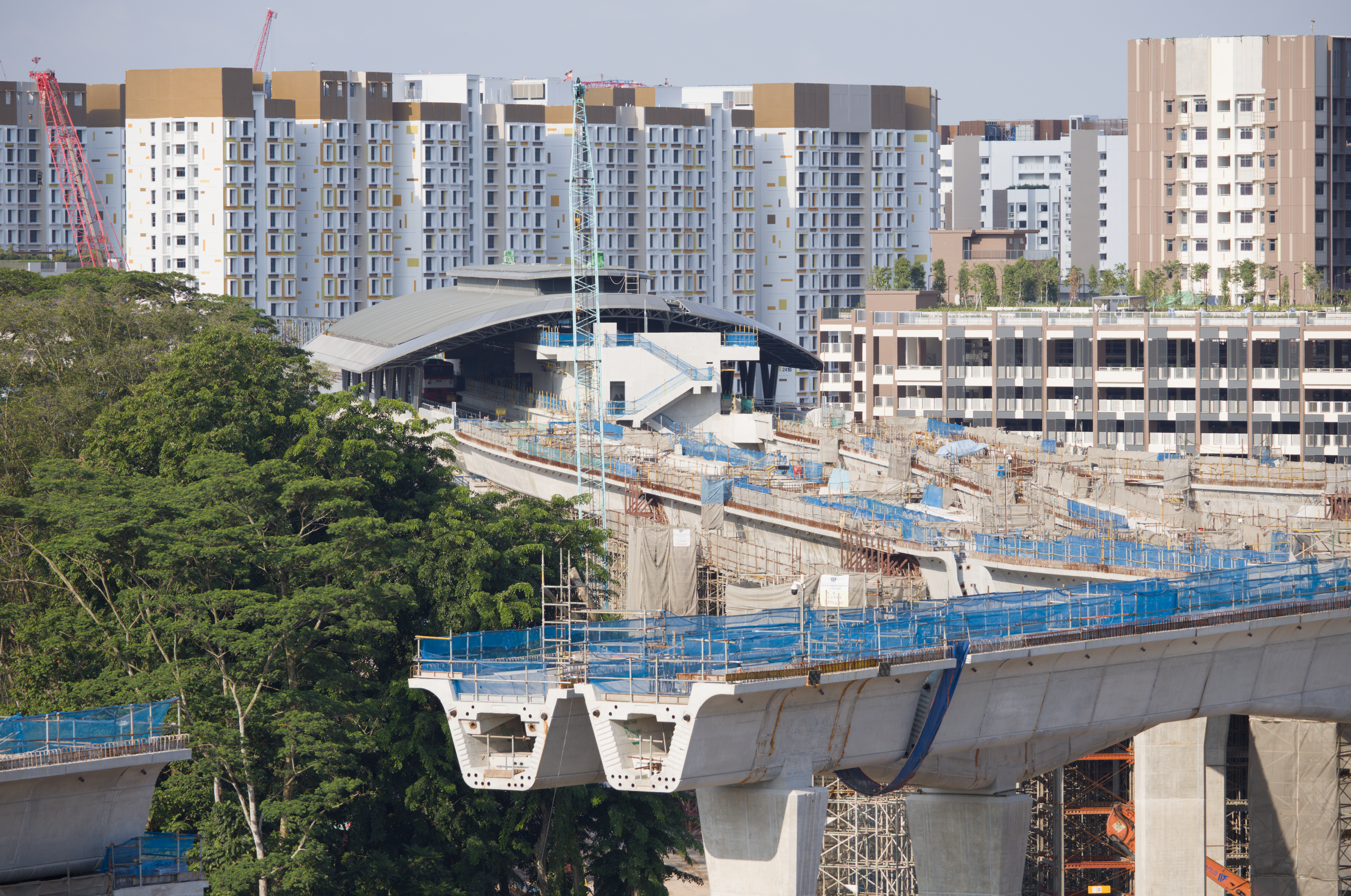
- Hong Kah MRT station in September 2025

General information
- Location: 31 Tengah Garden Avenue, Singapore 699914
- Coordinates: 01°21′29″N 103°43′33″E
- System: Future Mass Rapid Transit (MRT) station
- Owner: Land Transport Authority
- Operator: Singapore One Rail
- Line: Jurong Region Line
- Platforms: 2 (1 island platform)
- Tracks: 3 (Including one reception track to/from Tengah depot)
- Connections: Bus, Taxi

Construction
- Structure type: Elevated
- Platform levels: 1
- Cycle facilities: Yes
- Accessible: Yes

Other information
- Station code: HGK

History
- Opening: mid-2028; 2 years' time

Services
| Preceding station | Mass Rapid Transit | Following station |
|---|---|---|
| Tengah towards Choa Chu Kang | Jurong Region Line Future service | Corporation towards Boon Lay |
Track layout
Location
- Location within Singapore Rail

Hong Kah MRT station is a future elevated Mass Rapid Transit (MRT) station on the Jurong Region Line in Tengah, Singapore.

== History ==
On 9 May 2018, LTA announced that Hong Kah station would be part of the proposed Jurong Region Line (JRL). The station will be constructed as part of Phase 1, JRL (West), consisting of 10 stations between Choa Chu Kang, Boon Lay and Tawas, and is expected to be completed in mid-2028.

Contract J103 for the design and construction of Hong Kah Station and associated viaducts was awarded to Eng Lee Engineering Pte Ltd - Wai Fong Construction Pte Ltd Joint Venture (JV) at a sum of S$274.3 million. Construction will start in 2020, with completion in mid-2028. Contract J103 also includes the design and construction of Corporation station, and associated viaducts.

Initially expected to open in 2026, the restrictions on the construction due to the COVID-19 pandemic has led to delays in the JRL's completion, and the date was pushed to 2027. Due to construction and testing delays, the completion date was further delayed to mid-2028.

== Location ==
The station will be located within the future Tengah planning area.

The station name is also taken from Hong Kah Village and Hong Kah Constituency, of which it was closed down in 1990s and became an army training facility there. However, there were plans to change the name from Hong Kah to "Tengah Garden" for modernisation.
