= SRTC =

SRTC may refer to:

- Singapore Rail Test Centre, a rail testing facility in Tuas, Singapore
- Southern Regional Technical College, a public community college in Thomasville, Georgia, United States
