= Nanyang Crescent MRT station =

Future Mass Rapid Transit station in Singapore

Nanyang Crescent JW4 南洋弯 நன்யாங் க்ரெஸ்ஸன்
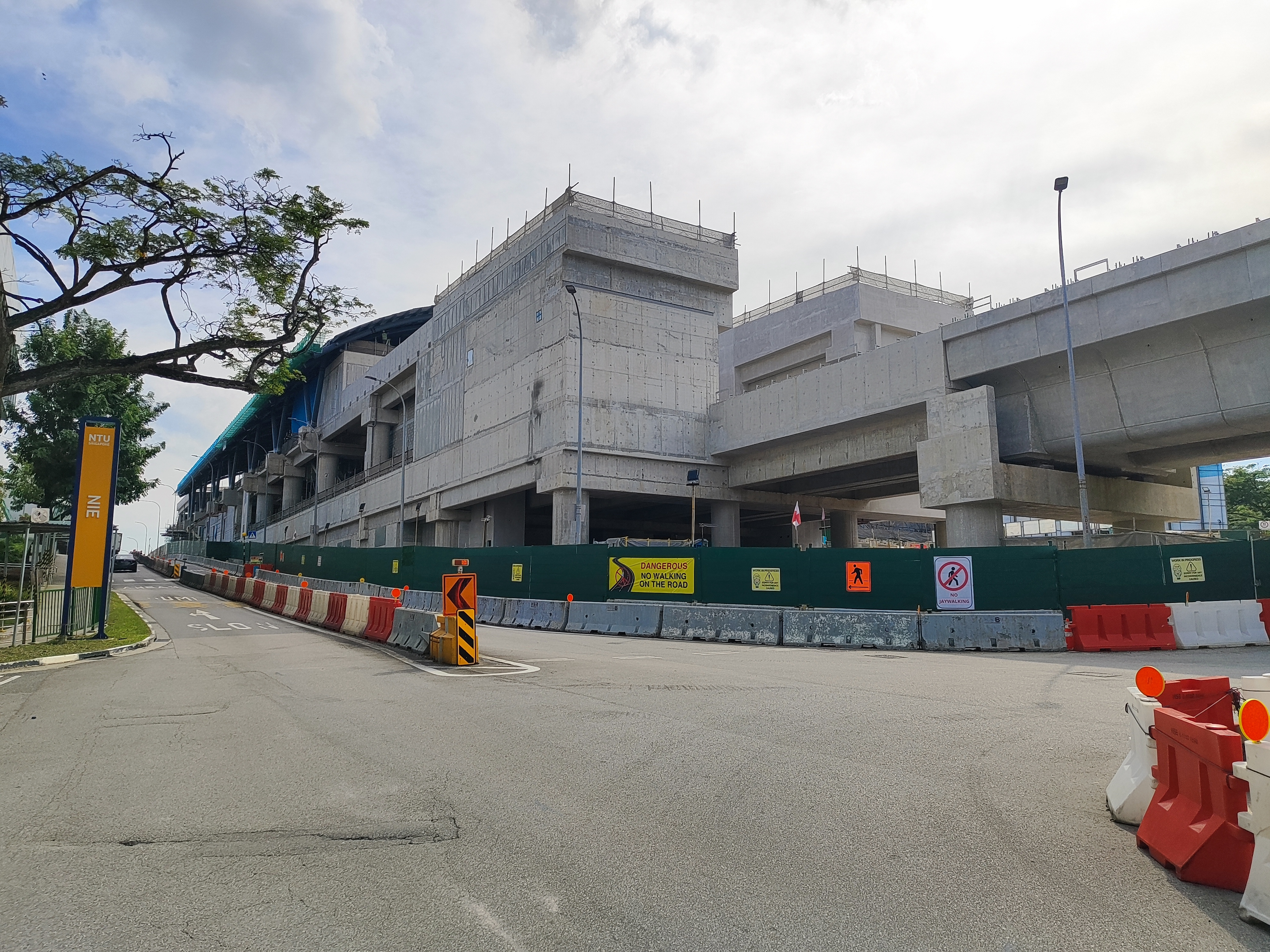
- Nanyang Crescent station under construction

General information
- Location: 75 Nanyang Drive, Singapore 639942
- Coordinates: 01°20′54″N 103°40′51″E
- System: Future Mass Rapid Transit (MRT) station
- Owner: Land Transport Authority
- Operator: Singapore One Rail
- Line: Jurong Region Line
- Platforms: 2 (2 side platforms)
- Tracks: 2
- Connections: Bus, Taxi

Construction
- Structure type: Elevated
- Platform levels: 1
- Parking: Yes
- Cycle facilities: Yes
- Accessible: Yes

Other information
- Station code: NYC

History
- Opening: 2029; 3 years' time

Services
Preceding station	Mass Rapid Transit	Following station
Nanyang Gateway towards Choa Chu Kang	Jurong Region Line Future service	Peng Kang Hill Terminus
Track layout
Location
- Location within Singapore Rail

Nanyang Crescent MRT station is a future elevated Mass Rapid Transit (MRT) station on the Jurong Region Line in Western Water Catchment, Singapore. The station will be located within the Nanyang Technological University (NTU).

== History ==
On 9 May 2018, the Land Transport Authority (LTA) announced that Nanyang Crescent station would be part of the proposed JRL. The station will be constructed as part of Phase 3, consisting of 7 stations – a 4 station extension to Jurong Pier from Boon Lay and a 3 station extension to Peng Kang Hill from Tawas. It was expected to be completed in 2028. However, the restrictions on construction due to the COVID-19 pandemic has led to delays, with the completion date pushed to 2029.

The contract for the design and construction of the Nanyang Gateway and Nanyang Crescent stations and 1.4 km (0.87 miles) of associated viaducts – Contract J113 – was awarded to Hwa Seng Builder Pte Ltd at S$263 million (US$192.8 million) on 6 April 2021. Construction is scheduled to start in the second quarter of 2021, with expected completion in 2029.

Starting on 31 July 2022, a section of Nanyang Drive had to be temporarily diverted for the station's construction, with two bus stops along the road shifted accordingly. The overhead bridge connecting the Nanyang Technological University (NTU) North Spine and the National Institute of Education (NIE) was demolished on 11 September that year.

== Details ==
Nanyang Crescent station will serve the JRL and will be located between the Nanyang Gateway and Peng Kang Hill stations. The official station code will be JW4. The station will be located in the Nanyang Technological University (NTU), along Nanyang Drive near the junction with Nanyang Walk.
