= Corporation MRT station =

Future Mass Rapid Transit station in Singapore

Corporation JS5 企业 கார்ப்பரெஷன்
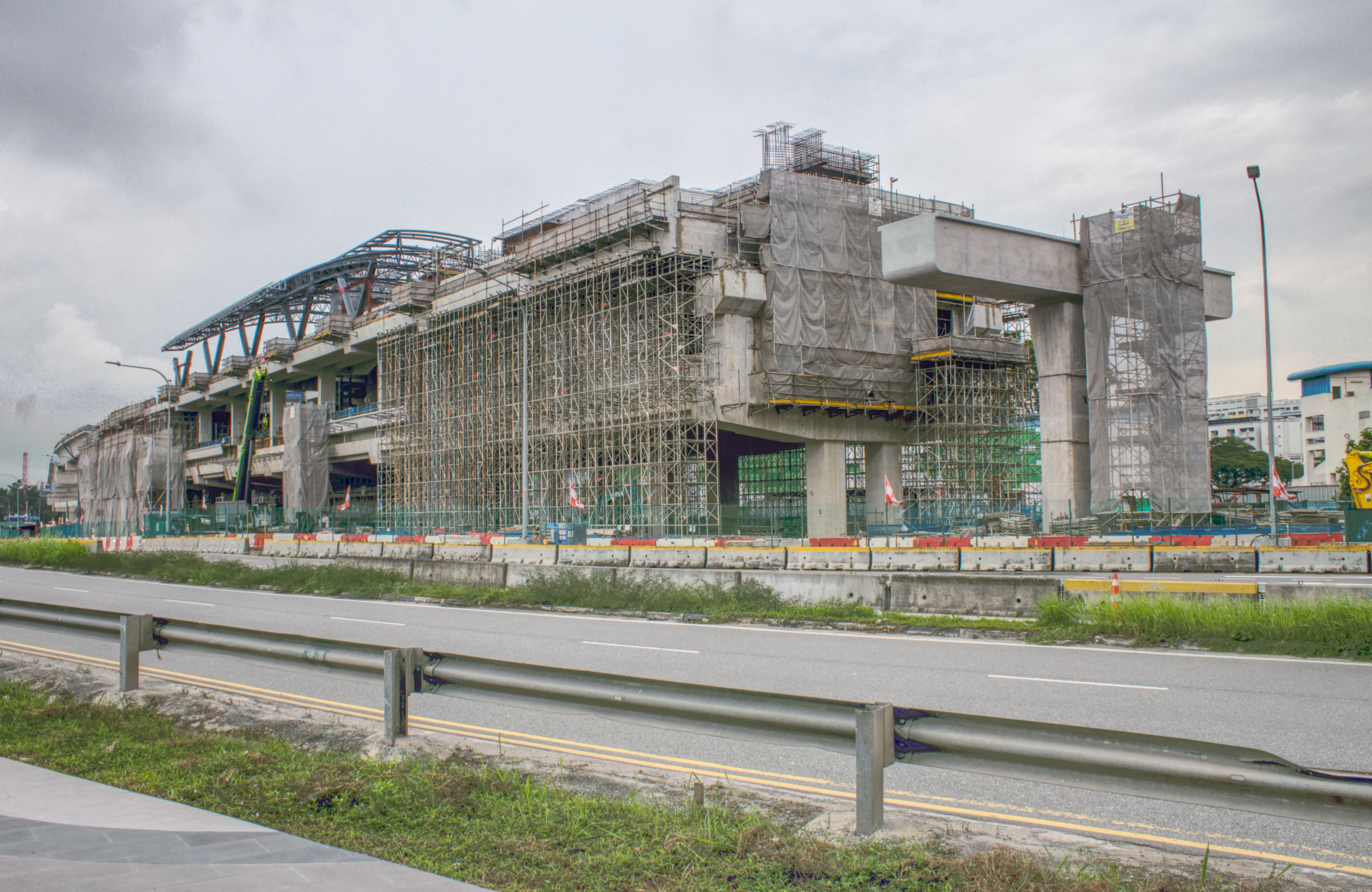
- Corporation MRT station site

General information
- Location: 100 Jurong West Avenue 2, Singapore 649673
- Coordinates: 01°21′11″N 103°42′50″E
- System: Future Mass Rapid Transit (MRT) station
- Owner: Land Transport Authority
- Operator: Singapore One Rail
- Line: Jurong Region Line
- Platforms: 2 (1 island platform)
- Tracks: 2
- Connections: Bus, Taxi

Construction
- Structure type: Elevated
- Platform levels: 1
- Cycle facilities: Yes
- Accessible: Yes

Other information
- Station code: CPN

History
- Opening: mid-2028; 2 years' time

Services
Preceding station	Mass Rapid Transit	Following station
Hong Kah towards Choa Chu Kang	Jurong Region Line Future service	Jurong West towards Boon Lay
Track layout
Location
- Location within Singapore Rail

Corporation MRT station is a future elevated Mass Rapid Transit (MRT) station on the Jurong Region Line in Jurong West, Singapore.

== History ==
On 9 May 2018, LTA announced that Corporation station would be part of the proposed Jurong Region Line (JRL). The station will be constructed as part of Phase 1, JRL (West), consisting of 10 stations between Choa Chu Kang, Boon Lay and Tawas, and is expected to be completed in mid-2028.

Contract J103 for the design and construction of Corporation Station and associated viaducts was awarded to Eng Lee Engineering Pte Ltd - Wai Fong Construction Pte Ltd Joint Venture (JV) at a sum of S$274.3 million. Construction started in 2020, with completion in mid-2028. Contract J103 also includes the design and construction of Hong Kah station, and associated viaducts.

Initially expected to open in 2026, the restrictions on the construction due to the COVID-19 pandemic has led to delays in the JRL line completion, and the date was pushed to 2027. Due to construction and testing delays, the completion date was further delayed to mid-2028.

== Location ==
The station will be straddled over the existing Jurong West Avenue 2, just east of the junction with Bulim Avenue and Corporation Road, and west of the PIE expressway exit. It is located within the Jurong West planning area between the Hong Kah and Wenya Subzones, with a housing estate and the future site of Jurong Pioneer Junior College to the south, and the Bulim district of the future Jurong Innovation District to the north.

Access to the station will be via 4 exits, 2 on each side of Jurong West Avenue 2.
