= Jurong West MRT station =

Future Mass Rapid Transit station in Singapore

Jurong West JS6 裕廊西 ஜூரோங் வெஸ்ட்
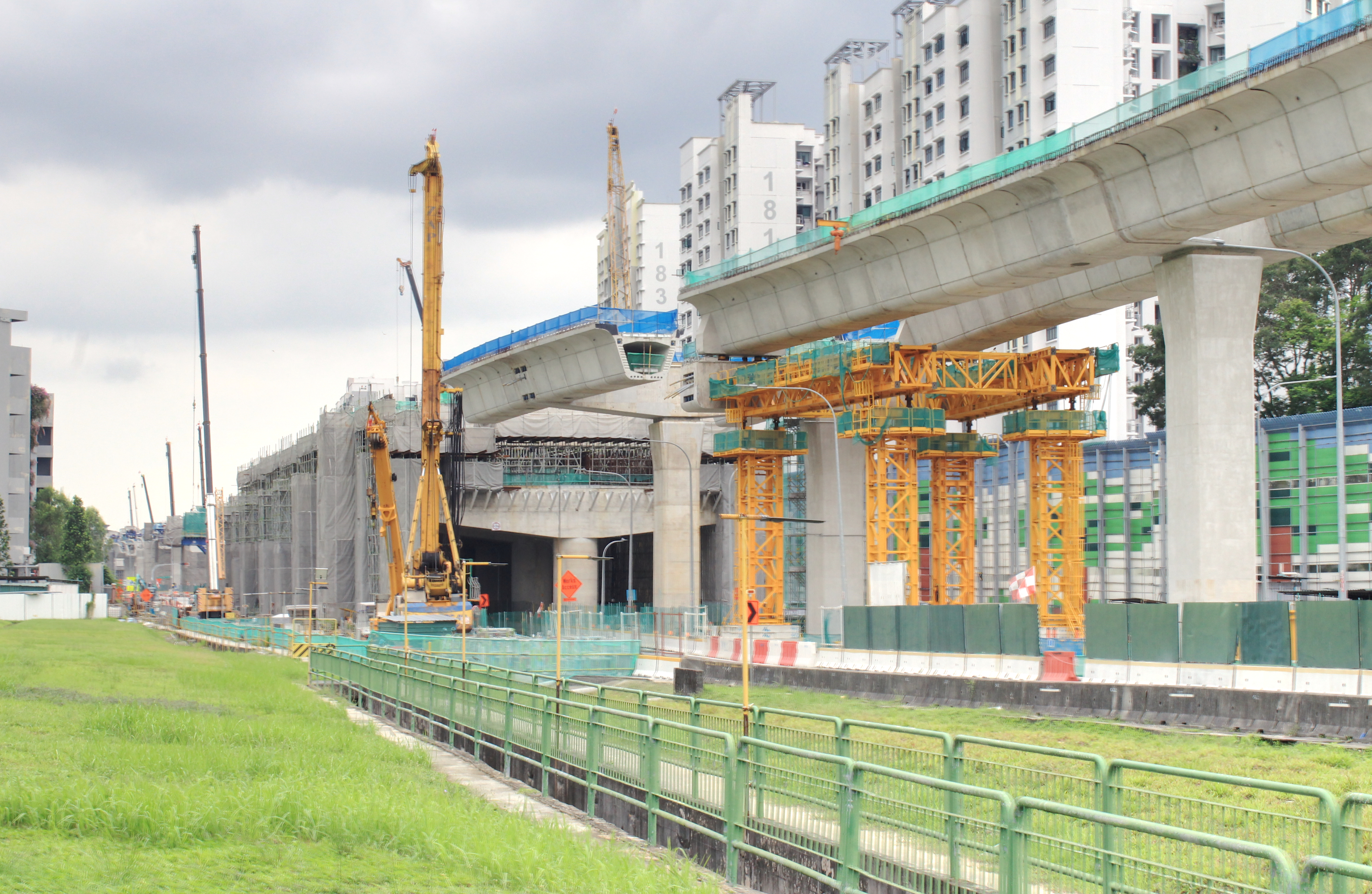
- Jurong West MRT station site in May 2024

General information
- Location: 50 Jurong West Avenue 2, Singapore 649659
- Coordinates: 01°20′57″N 103°42′30″E
- System: Future Mass Rapid Transit (MRT) station
- Owner: Land Transport Authority
- Operator: Singapore One Rail
- Line: Jurong Region Line
- Platforms: 2 (1 island platform)
- Tracks: 2
- Connections: Bus, Taxi

Construction
- Structure type: Elevated
- Platform levels: 1
- Cycle facilities: Yes
- Accessible: Yes

Other information
- Station code: JRW

History
- Opening: mid-2028; 2 years' time

Services
| Preceding station | Mass Rapid Transit | Following station |
|---|---|---|
| Corporation towards Choa Chu Kang | Jurong Region Line Future service | Bahar Junction towards Boon Lay |
Track layout
Location
- Location within Singapore Rail

Jurong West MRT station is a future elevated Mass Rapid Transit (MRT) station on the Jurong Region Line in Jurong West, Singapore.

== History ==
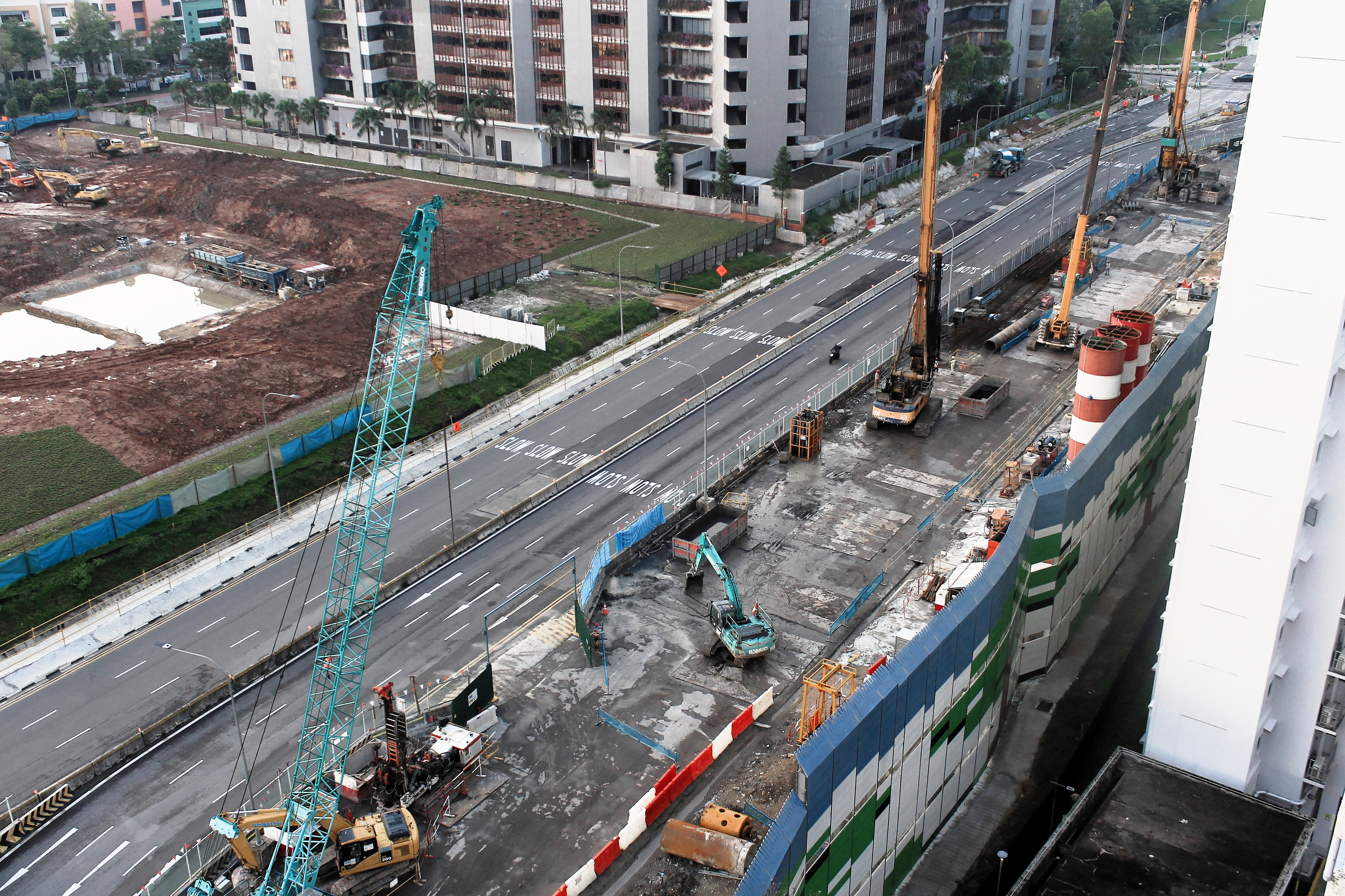
Road diversion works in June 2022

On 9 May 2018, LTA announced that Jurong West station would be part of the proposed Jurong Region line (JRL). The station will be constructed as part of Phase 1, JRL (West), consisting of 10 stations between Choa Chu Kang, Boon Lay and Tawas, and is expected to be completed in mid-2028.

On 20 November 2019, Contract J105 for the design and construction of Jurong West Station and associated viaducts was awarded to China Railway 11 Bureau Group (Singapore Branch) at a sum of S$210.1 million. Construction starts in 2020, with completion in mid-2028. Contract J105 also includes the design and construction of Bahar Junction Station, and associated viaducts.

Initially expected to open in 2026, the restrictions on the construction due to the COVID-19 pandemic has led to delays in the JRL line completion, and the date was pushed to 2027. Due to construction and testing delays, the completion date was further delayed to mid-2028.

== Location ==
The station will be straddled over the existing Jurong West Avenue 2, just west of the junction with Jurong West Street 23, and east of the junction with Jurong West Avenue 4, Jalan Bahar and Jalan Boon Lay. It is located within the Jurong West planning area between the Boon Lay Place and Wenya Subzones, with a St. Joseph's Home and Singapore Boy's Home to the north, and a housing estate to the south.

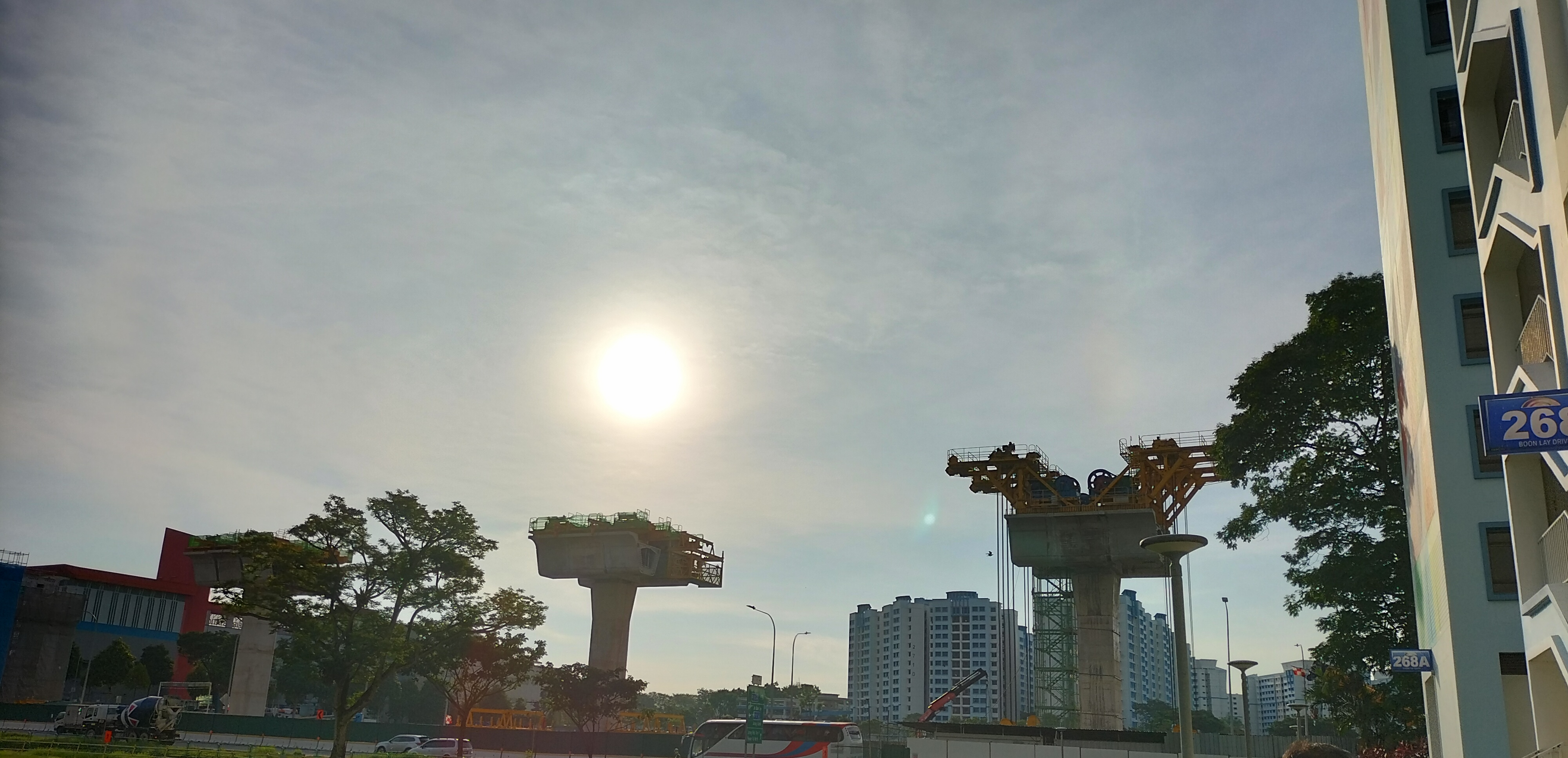
Construction progress of the tracks near Jurong West station

Access to the station will be via 3 exits on each side of Jurong West Avenue 2.
