= WJ =

- WJ may refer to:
- Jeep Grand Cherokee (WJ), a generation of Jeep Grand Cherokee
- Air Labrador, based in Canada (1948-2017, IATA code WJ)
- West Jersey Railroad, a predecessor of the West Jersey and Seashore Railroad
- WestJet airlines
- Wiking-Jugend, a German Neo-Nazi organization
- Woodcock–Johnson Tests of Cognitive Abilities, a set of intelligence tests
- Word joiner, a Unicode character
- Fighting World of Japan Pro Wrestling, also known as World Japan
- Waylon Jennings (1937-2002), American musician

== See also ==
- JW
