= Gek Poh MRT station =

Future Mass Rapid Transit station in Singapore

Gek Poh JW1 玉宝 ஜெக் போ
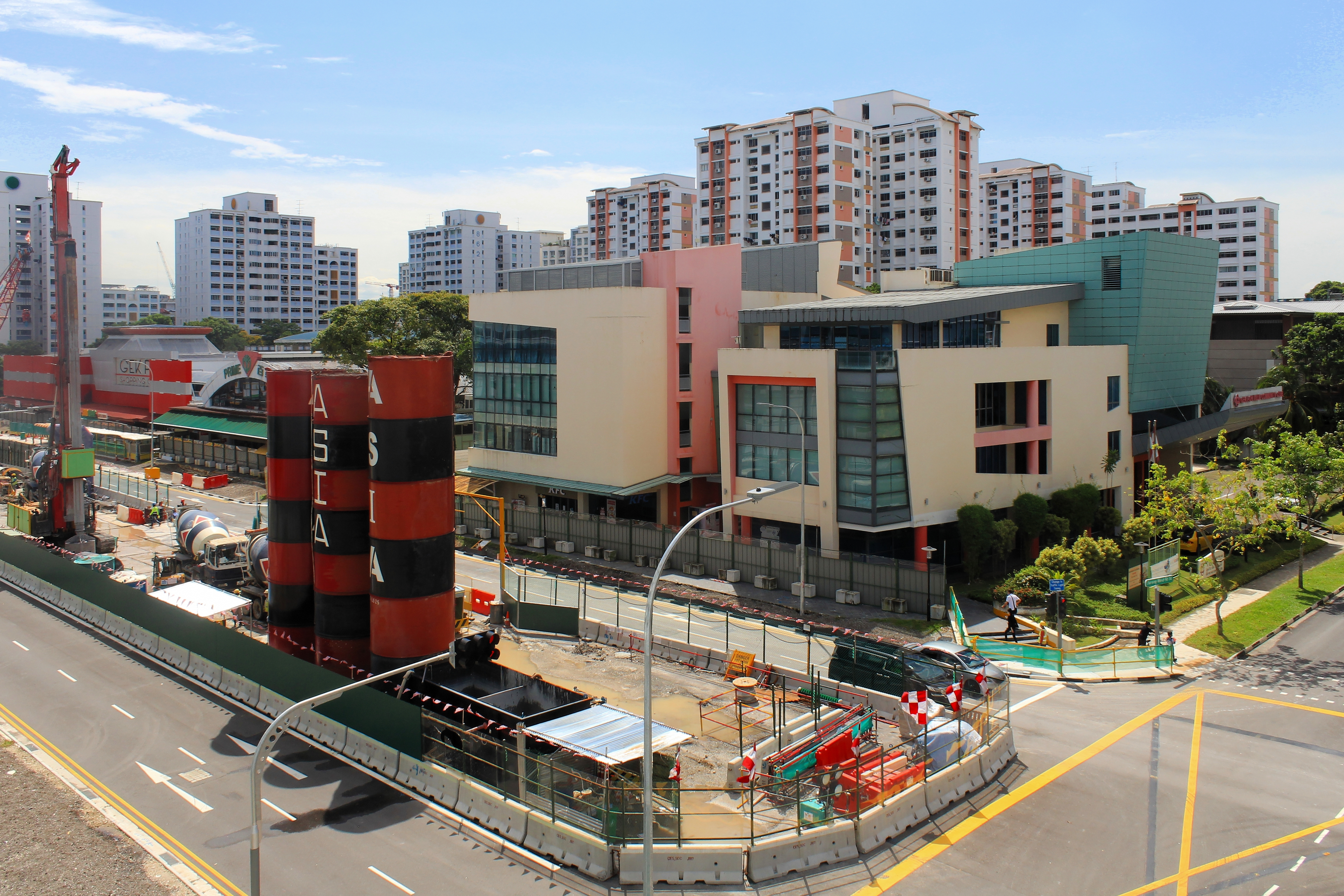
- Gek Poh MRT station site

General information
- Location: 31 Jurong West Street 75, Singapore 649829
- Coordinates: 01°20′54″N 103°41′53″E
- System: Future Mass Rapid Transit (MRT) station
- Owner: Land Transport Authority
- Operator: Singapore One Rail
- Line: Jurong Region Line
- Platforms: 2 (2 side platforms)
- Tracks: 2
- Connections: Bus, Taxi

Construction
- Structure type: Elevated
- Platform levels: 1
- Parking: Yes
- Cycle facilities: Yes
- Accessible: Yes

Other information
- Station code: GKP

History
- Opening: mid-2028; 2 years' time

Services
Preceding station	Mass Rapid Transit	Following station
Bahar Junction towards Choa Chu Kang	Jurong Region Line Future service	Tawas Terminus
Track layout
Location
- Location within Singapore Rail

Gek Poh MRT station is a future elevated Mass Rapid Transit (MRT) station along the Jurong Region Line in Jurong West, Singapore.

== History ==
On 9 May 2018, LTA announced that Gek Poh station would be part of the proposed Jurong Region Line (JRL). The station will be constructed as part of Phase 1, JRL (West), consisting of 10 stations between Choa Chu Kang, Boon Lay and Tawas, and is expected to be completed in mid-2028.

Contract J107 for the design and construction of Gek Poh station and associated viaducts was awarded to Sembcorp Design and Construction Pte Ltd at a sum of S$226.6 million (US$166.1 million). Construction will start in 2020, with completion in mid-2028. Contract J107 also includes the design and construction of Tawas, and associated viaducts.

Initially expected to open in 2026, the restrictions on the construction due to the COVID-19 pandemic has led to delays in the JRL line completion, and the date was pushed to 2027. Due to construction and testing delays, the completion date was further delayed to mid-2028.

In the early morning of 4 January 2024, a 27-year-old construction worker was injured when he fell from an unfinished platform. The worker was brought to Ng Teng Fong General Hospital where he died from his wounds. Work at the station site was halted while safety procedures were reviewed at all LTA construction sites.

== Location ==
The station complex will be straddled over the existing Jurong West Street 75, between the junction with Jurong West Street 74, and the junction with Jurong West Avenue 5 and Jurong West Street 82. It is located within the Jurong West planning area in the Yunan Subzone, nested by multiple housing estates, with Gek Poh Shopping Centre and Gek Poh Ville Community Club to the north.

Access to the station will be via 3 exits on each side of Jurong West Street 75.
