= Bahar Junction MRT station =

Future Mass Rapid Transit station in Singapore

Bahar Junction JS7 峇哈路口 பஹார் சந்திப்பு
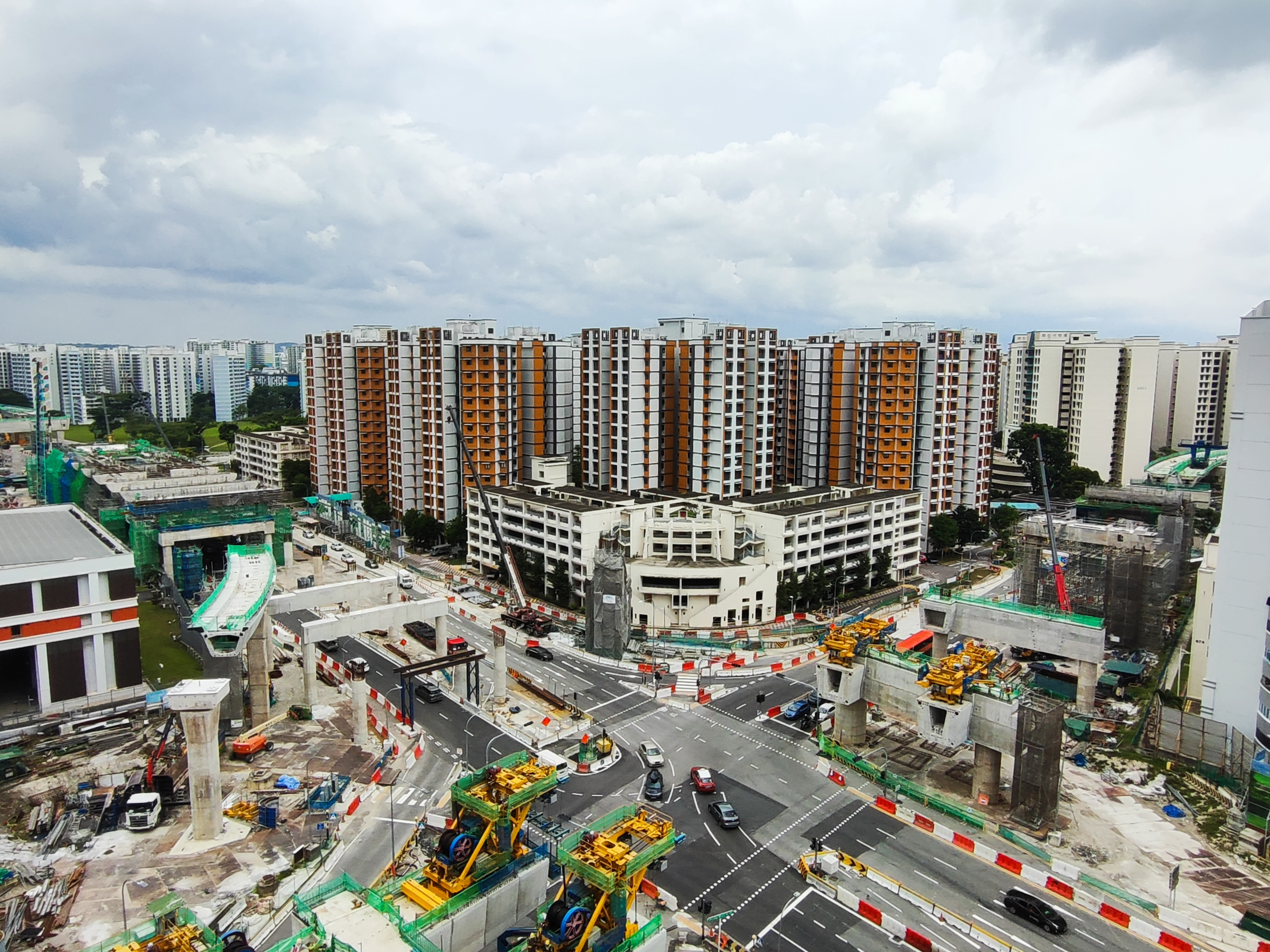
- Bahar Junction construction site

General information
- Location: 30 Jurong West Avenue 4, Singapore 649658
- Coordinates: 01°20′43.52″N 103°42′9.15″E
- System: Future Mass Rapid Transit (MRT) station
- Owner: Land Transport Authority
- Operator: Singapore One Rail
- Line: Jurong Region Line
- Platforms: 3 (1 island platform, 1 side platform)
- Tracks: 3
- Connections: Bus, Taxi

Construction
- Structure type: Elevated
- Platform levels: 1
- Parking: Yes
- Cycle facilities: Yes
- Accessible: Yes

Other information
- Station code: BHJ

History
- Opening: mid-2028; 2 years' time

Services
Preceding station	Mass Rapid Transit	Following station
Jurong West towards Choa Chu Kang	Jurong Region Line Future service	Boon Lay Terminus
Boon Lay One-way operation	Jurong Region Line Future service	Gek Poh towards Tawas
Track layout
Location
- Location within Singapore Rail

Bahar Junction MRT station is a future elevated Mass Rapid Transit (MRT) station in Jurong West, Singapore. Serving the Jurong Region Line (JRL), the station will be located at the junction of Jurong West Avenue 4 and Jurong West Street 75.

Bahar Junction station was first announced along with the 24 JRL stations in May 2018. The station is slated to open in mid-2028 along with JRL Stage 1. Bahar Junction station will have two platforms to serve three branches converging at this station.

== History ==
On 9 May 2018, the Land Transport Authority (LTA) announced Bahar Junction station as part of the proposed 24-kilometre (15 mi) Jurong Region line (JRL). The station will be constructed as part of Stage 1, consisting of 10 stations from Choa Chu Kang to this station and two branches to Tawas and Boon Lay. This stage was expected to be completed in mid-2028.

The contract for the design and construction of Bahar Junction station and the adjacent Jurong West station was awarded to China Railway 11 Bureau Group (Singapore Branch) in December 2019. The S$210.1 million (US$154.01 million) contract also included the construction of 1.15 kilometres (0.71 miles) of associated viaducts. Construction was scheduled to start in 2020, with a scheduled completion date of 2026. However, the restrictions on construction due to the COVID-19 pandemic has led to delays, with the completion date pushed to 2027. Due to construction and testing delays, the completion date was further delayed to mid-2028.

== Details ==
The station will serve the JRL with the three branches converging at this station. The adjacent stations will be Jurong West on the Choa Chu Kang branch, Gek Poh on the Peng Kang Hill branch and Boon Lay station on the Jurong Pier branch. The official station code will be JS7. The station will have six entrances and will be located over Jurong West Avenue 4 and the junction with Jurong West Street 75 and Jurong West Street 64.

The T-shaped station will have two platforms – an island platform for services towards Choa Chu Kang or Jurong Pier and a side platform for services towards Peng Kang Hill. A bridge will link the two platforms for transfers between services. Hence, commuters from the Nanyang Technological University (NTU) on the Peng Kang Hill branch have to alight at this station to transfer for services towards Boon Lay. With the need for a transfer, however, plenty of NTU students have commented they would prefer taking a direct bus route instead of taking the JRL when travelling between the school and Boon Lay.

== Gallery ==
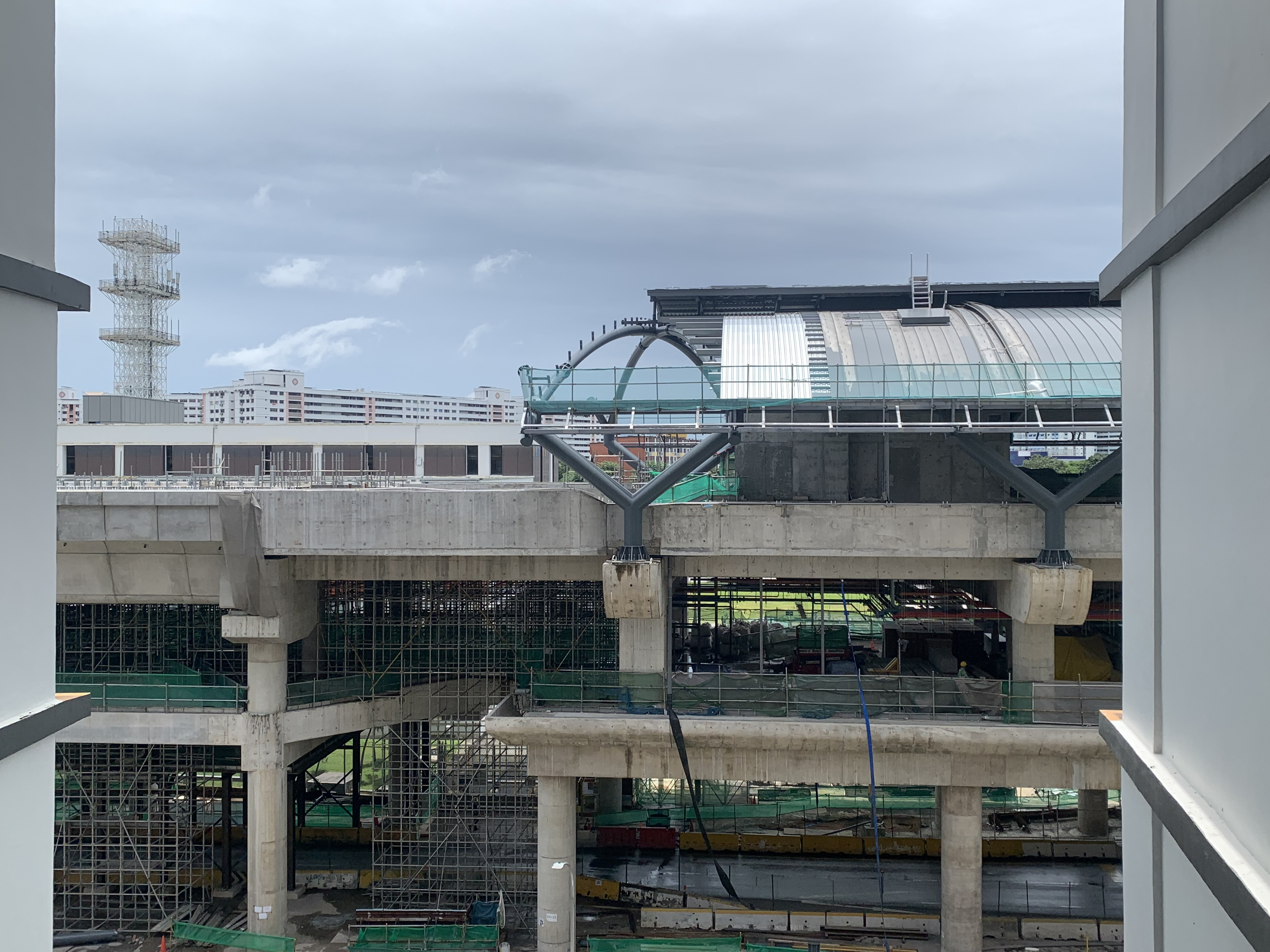
The station under construction in September 2025

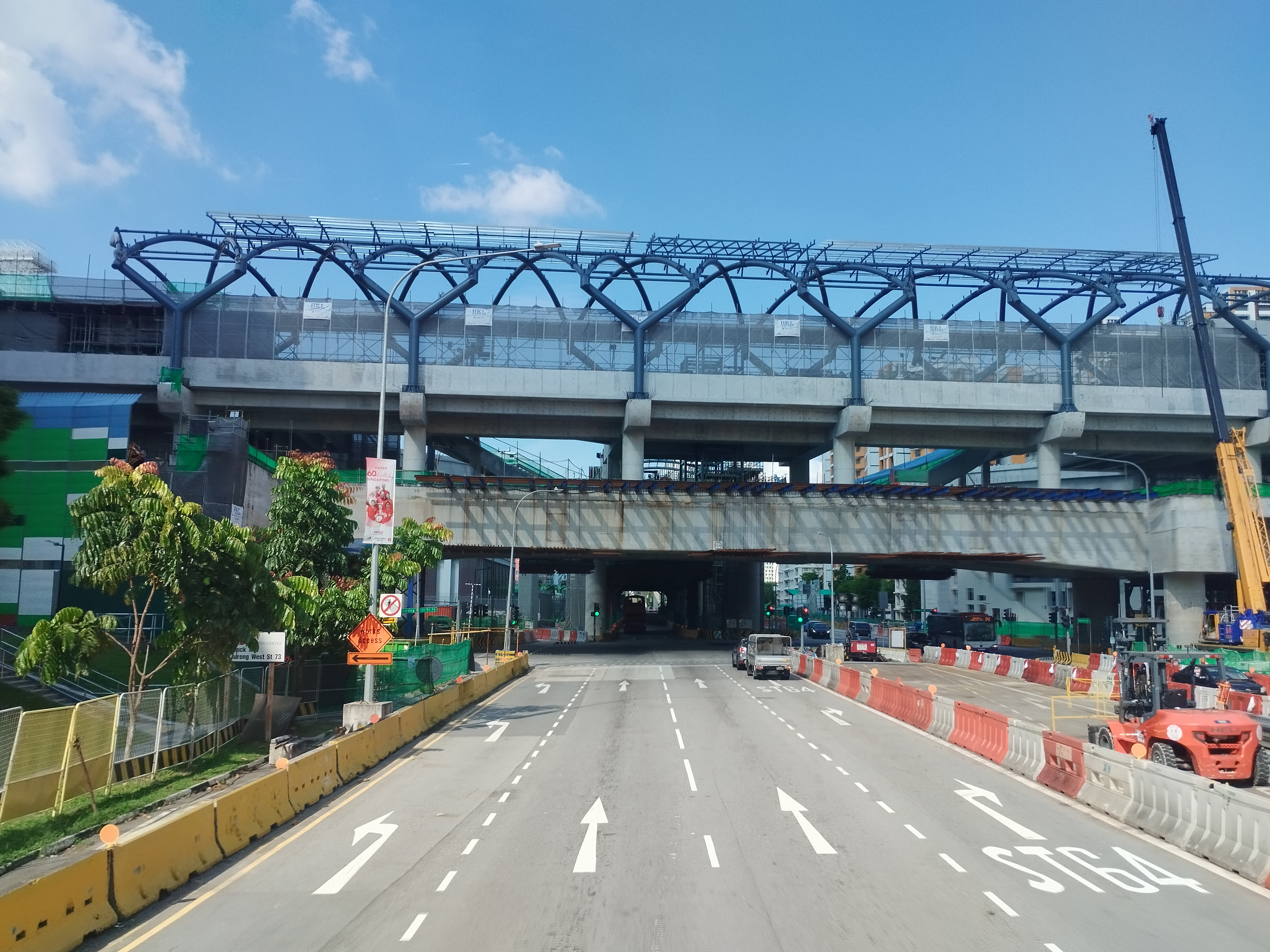
Peng Kang Hill bound platform
