= Safti City =

Military training facility in Singapore

SAFTI City
- Western Water Catchment in Singapore
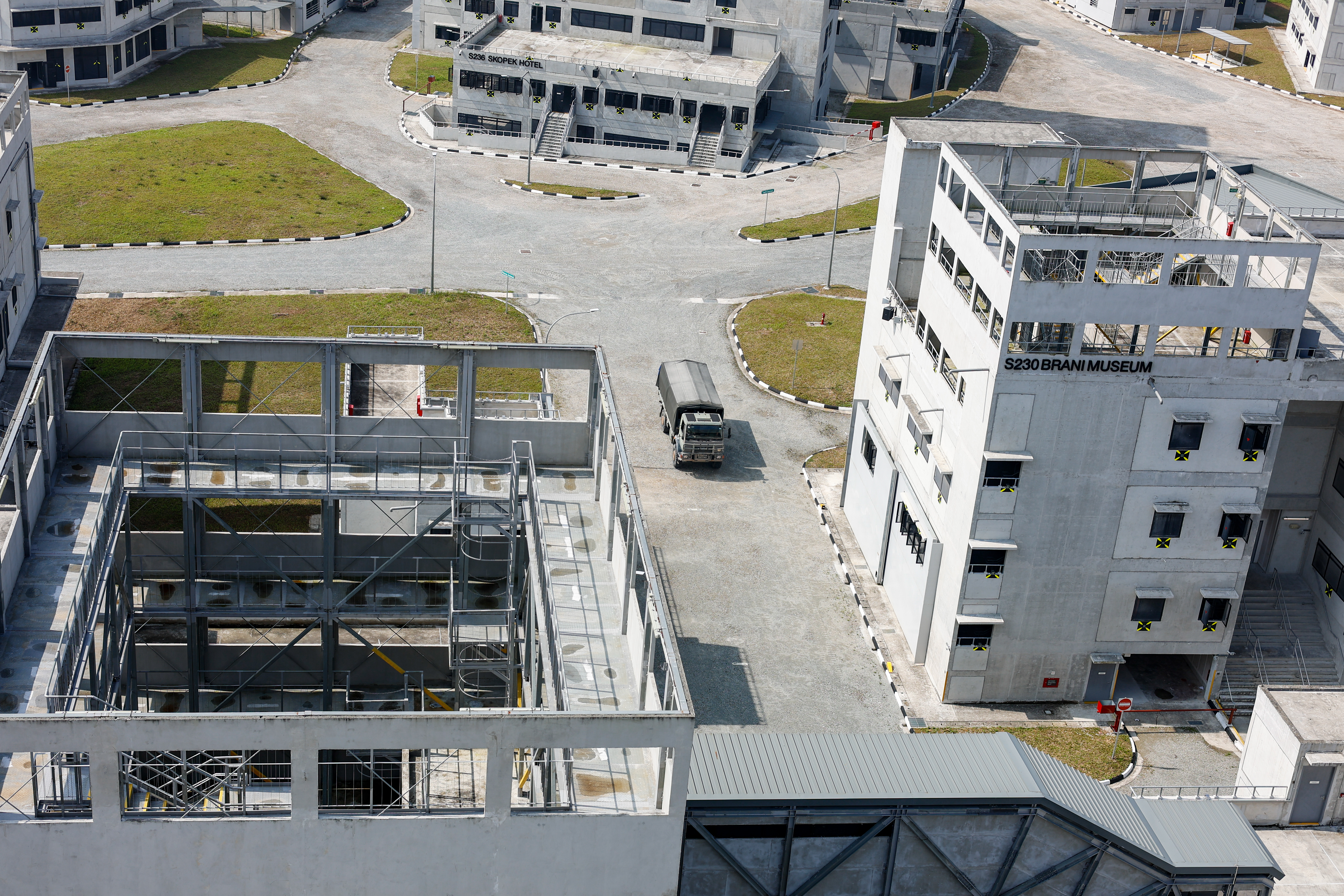
- Safti City training area in 2025

Site information
- Type: Urban training facility
- Owner: Ministry of Defence
- Operator: Singapore Armed Forces
- Open to the public: No

Location
- Coordinates: 1.36961°N 103.68162°E

Site history
- Built: Phase 1: 2017–2024; Phase 2: 2017–? (Under construction)
- In use: Since October 2024

Chinese name
- Simplified Chinese: 新加坡武装部队军训城
- Hanyu Pinyin: Xīnjiāpō wǔzhuāng bùduì jūnxùnchéng
- Literal meaning: Singapore armed forces military training city
Transcriptions
Standard Mandarin
- Hanyu Pinyin: Xīnjiāpō wǔzhuāng bùduì jūnxùnchéng
Yue: Cantonese
- Jyutping: san^{1} gaa^{3} bo^{1} mou^{5} zong^{1} bou^{6} deoi^{6} gwan^{1} fan^{3} sing^{4}
Southern Min
- Hokkien POJ: Sin-ka-pho bú-chong pō͘-tūi kun-hùn-siâⁿ
- Tâi-lô: Sin-ka-pho bú-tsong pōo-tūi kun-hùn-siânn
- Teochew Peng'im: Sing^{1}gia^{1}bo^{1} bhu^{2}zuang^{1} bou^{6}dui^{7} gung^{1}hung^{3}sian^{5}

Safti City (Note: Chinese: 新加坡武装部队军训城; Malay: Bandar Safti; Tamil: சாஃப்டி சிட்டி) is a Singapore armed forces training institute located in Western Water Catchment, Singapore.

== History ==
The plan to build the facility was first publicly announced in parliament by Minister for Defence Ng Eng Hen on 3 March 2017. The budget for the facility was slated to be 900 million Singapore dollars. Phase 1 was officially launched on 19 March 2025 by Minister for Defence Ng Eng Hen. The team behind the facility received defence tech award on 1 October 2025.

The SAF and PLA conducted an exercise together from 10th to 17th December 2025. The exercise involved 90 personnel from the SAF’s 3rd Singapore Division and 1st Commando Battalion, and 90 from the PLA’s Southern Theatre Command Army’s 74th Army Group.

== Facilities ==
=== Phase 1 ===
Phase 1 includes 71 buildings in the city, of which 43 are mid- to high-rise ones. One building is a recreation of a bus interchange, which had includes recreations of facilities such as boarding berths, escalator mock-ups and high ceilings which are typically common inside bus interchanges. Next to the interchange is a high-rise structure, a 12-storey office building recreation called Murai Tower, which simulates an office building. There are three 12-storey buildings in the city, with the other two simulating a residential block and a hotel. Sensors are dotted around the building in various areas such as along corridors, rooms and the lift which allows trainers to track each soldier’s position during a combat exercise. Devices marked in yellow and black are located on the exterior of buildings. Known as a “shoot through wall module”, they can simulate a wall “crumbling” when a soldier shoots at it. This adds to the realism of battle, as soldiers can no longer hide behind walls if they are “destroyed”.

There are also speakers that emit noises, such as blasts from an air strike, to keep soldiers on their toes. There are a total of around 11,000 such sensors and devices installed throughout the facility, which reportedly is meant to help add to the realism of warfare and track the movement of soldiers. The area covered by this first phase is 17 hectares.

=== Phase 2 ===
Phase 2 has yet to commence operation as it is still under construction.
