= List of railway test tracks =

Railway rolling stock testing and certification facilities

Railway test tracks and their facilities are used for rolling stock testing and certification. Railway test tracks around the world include:

== China ==
- Beijing National Railway Test Centre

== Czech Republic ==
- Velim railway test circuit

== France ==
- Centre d'essais ferroviaires – Near Alstom Valenciennes factory site in Raismes, includes 2.75 km for testing at 100 km/h, a 1.85 km loop for endurance testing at 80 km/h, and a loop for testing driverless trains.

== Germany ==
- Wegberg-Wildenrath Test and Validation Centre – Near Wildenrath in North Rhine-Westphalia. Several loops of standard gauge and metre gauge track with various electrification systems.
- Emsland test facility - The 31,8 km single track line runs between Dörpen and Lathen in Lower Saxony. The now defunct site was used to test Transrapid maglev trains but was closed in 2011 and is supposed to be demolished.

== India ==
- Construction for Indian Railways' first test track is underway in Jodhpur division, Rajasthan. The 60 km track is being built to conduct tests for Semi-high-speed rail and high-speed rail (200-250 km/h) and to test the axle loads of up to 32.5 tonnes.

== Italy ==
- Bologna San Donato railway test circuit

== Japan ==
- Yamanashi test track – Maglev technology development for the future Chuo Shinkansen line.
- Tōkaidō Shinkansen Model Line – Tōkaidō Shinkansen test track, since 1962 to 1964. From Ayase, Kanagawa to near Kamonomiya Station (Odawara, Kanagawa). About 30 km long. It was incorporated into the main line.
- MIHARA Test Center – A railway test centre used by Mitsubishi Heavy Industries to test rolling stock for conventional rail (including light rail transit), automated guideway transit (especially the Mitsubishi Crystal Mover) and maglev High Speed Surface Transport.

== Poland ==
- Newag – manufacturer's onsite test track.
- Test Track Centre near Żmigród – Operated by Railway Institute, Warsaw. 7.7 km standard gauge loop, 160 km/h maximum allowed speed.

== Romania ==
- Railway Testing Center Faurei – Total length of lines: 20,2 km, maximum speed 200 km/h.

== Russia ==
- Moscow Monorail – 2.8 km operational, experimental monorail line.
- VNIIZhT experimental ring railway – A 6-kilometre-long (3.7 mi) circular test track in Shcherbinka, south of Moscow.

== Singapore ==
- Integrated Train Testing Centre – future integrated testing facility for all new and existing MRT lines due to open in stages from end-2022 to 2024.

== Spain ==
- Olmedo - Medina del Campo test track 14.4km in length

The test track is built on the site of a closed broad gauge (1,668 mm (5 ft 5 21/32 in)) line.

== United Kingdom ==
- Global Centre of Rail Excellence
- Old Dalby Test Track
- High Marnham Test Track

== United States ==
- Maglev – AMT Test Track, Powder Springs, Georgia
- Transportation Technology Center – Four test tracks, total length 48 miles (77 km), max speed (one of the tracks) 165 mph (266 km/h), Pueblo, Colorado
- Miner Enterprises – Incline test track used for dynamic impacts, with a maximum drop speed of 16 mph (26 km/h), Geneva, Illinois
