= W. A. B. Goodall =

William Goodall
- Born: 1880; Eccles, Manchester
- Died: 1941 (aged 60–61); Singapore
- Education: Bedford Modern School

William Arthur Bates Goodall (1880–1941) was a British soldier and engineer who achieved a period of popular renown as a voluntary castaway on the island of Pulau Serimbun in the Johore Straits west of Singapore during the 1930s. The island, only two acres in area, had been uninhabited for many years and was considered to be haunted. Goodall came to be regarded as a local Robinson Crusoe in Singapore, however when his story spread through the international press he became known as 'the ruler of the world's tiniest kingdom'.

== Early life ==
William Arthur Bates Goodall was born in Eccles, Greater Manchester in 1880 and was brought up there and in Bedford where he attended Bedford Modern School. At the age of 16 he enlisted as a private in the First Battalion, the Manchester Regiment, and fought in the Second Boer War for which he was awarded the King's South Africa Medal and the Queen's South Africa Medal with 5 clasps. Goodall was present at the Defence of Ladysmith and later recalled that when the siege was finally broken by the British under Sir Redvers Buller, he 'sat down and wept for joy' when he was offered a cigarette by one of the relieving soldiers.

== Civilian life ==
The Regiment was drafted to Singapore in 1903 at which point Goodall, who didn't like the prospect of 'soldiering in the East', embarked on a civilian career. He spent some time in Sumatra and tried his hand at tin mining and tea planting. He secured a position with the Singapore Municipal Commissioners in the Water Department and was engaged on the construction of the Pierce, Gunong Pulai and Pontian reservoirs. He was also credited with the discovery of the Sembawang Hot Springs.

== Pulau Serimbun ==
Goodall had been visiting Pulau Serimbun since the 1920s and had spent increasing amounts of his spare time there. When the contracts on the Singapore Reservoirs ended in 1932, he decided to live there permanently. He described the attractions of life as a castaway:

'Being a Robinson Crusoe is a delightfully peaceful existence for those who are not wedded to the pictures, the club, the hotel bar or a bevy of friends and acquaintances and for those who love nature'.

He lived alone on Pulau Serimbun until 1935 before succumbing to loneliness and the rigours of maintaining the island. He engaged a Chinese employee to help him in practical and clerical matters and he was followed by other helpers, a Javanese and another Chinese. His story was given an added dimension by a Fleet Street journalist, H. Harvey-Day, who provided a few embellishments:

'Should you happen to sail past Pulau Serimbun at sunset-a most unlikely occurrence, as it is off the beaten track-the musical notes of a Boer bugle will float over the waves, and the Union Jack together with a mysterious ensign being a white horse impressed on dark azure background, will flutter slowly to the ground. Perhaps you will have the good fortune to observe Mr W.A.B. Goodall erectly saluting during this evening rite, for the island is his private kingdom...There he hopes to live peacefully to the end, ruling his four subjects, who are also his friends-a Chinese educated at Cambridge, two Chinese servants and a Malay boatman'.

The story appeared in the London Evening News and was picked up by other newspapers across the globe, leading to a spate of letters to Goodall from New Zealand, Germany, Britain and the United States.

'Talking of correspondence reminds me of some very interesting letters which began to arrive in August last, addressed to Coral island in seas west of Singapore. These letters were of a direct consequence of a long and very inaccurate account of my life on the island which appeared without my knowledge in the Evening News, London. Some of my correspondents seemed to think we lived behind a stockade and spent our time beating off the attacks of savages. They exhorted me 'to keep the flag flying' and so on'.

Goodall, whilst seemingly not averse to the attention, was dismayed by some of the inaccuracies. He did, however, seem to accept a measure of jurisdiction: 'I've been dubbed the laird of Serimbun by the press, and as I'm the only authority on the island, with a staff of two Chinese and one Javanese, I suppose the title is a good one'.

== Goodall and Singapore ==
Despite his geographical isolation William Goodall seems to have played a full part in the social life of Singapore. He corresponded regularly with Straits Times in matters relating to the natural history of Serimbun. He once picked up a Kapal Hantu, a Malayan 'Ghost Ship', which he donated to the Raffles Museum. The Manchester Regiment continued to be stationed at Singapore and Goodall was always a prominent figure in the annual commemorations of Ladysmith. He appears to have been an excellent raconteur and he travelled to Singapore to give Radio talks, for example about his life on the island, 'An Amateur Robinson Crusoe', and once gave a broadcast of his reminiscences about the attack of SMS Emden during the Battle of Penang at which he had been an eye-witness.

William Arthur Bates Goodall died at the Johore Bahru Hospital in 1941 aged 61.
