= Pulau Sarimbun =

Island in Singapore

- Location within Singapore

Geography
- Location: Straits of Johor
- Coordinates: 1°26′3.192″N 103°41′6″E
- Area: 1.4 ha (3.5 acres)

Administration
- Singapore

Pulau Sarimbun (previously also spelled Pulau Serimbun or Pulau Srimbun) is a small island situated in the Straits of Johor, off the north-western coast of Singapore. Located within Singapore waters, it has an area of 1.4 hectares.

William Arthur Bates Goodall was a regular visitor in the 1920s and subsequently lived there permanently in the 1930s until his death in 1941. He was referred to as the "Robinson Crusoe" of the island by the press at the time.
