= Nanyang Gateway MRT station =

Future Mass Rapid Transit station in Singapore

Nanyang Gateway JW3 南洋门 நன்யாங் கேட்வே
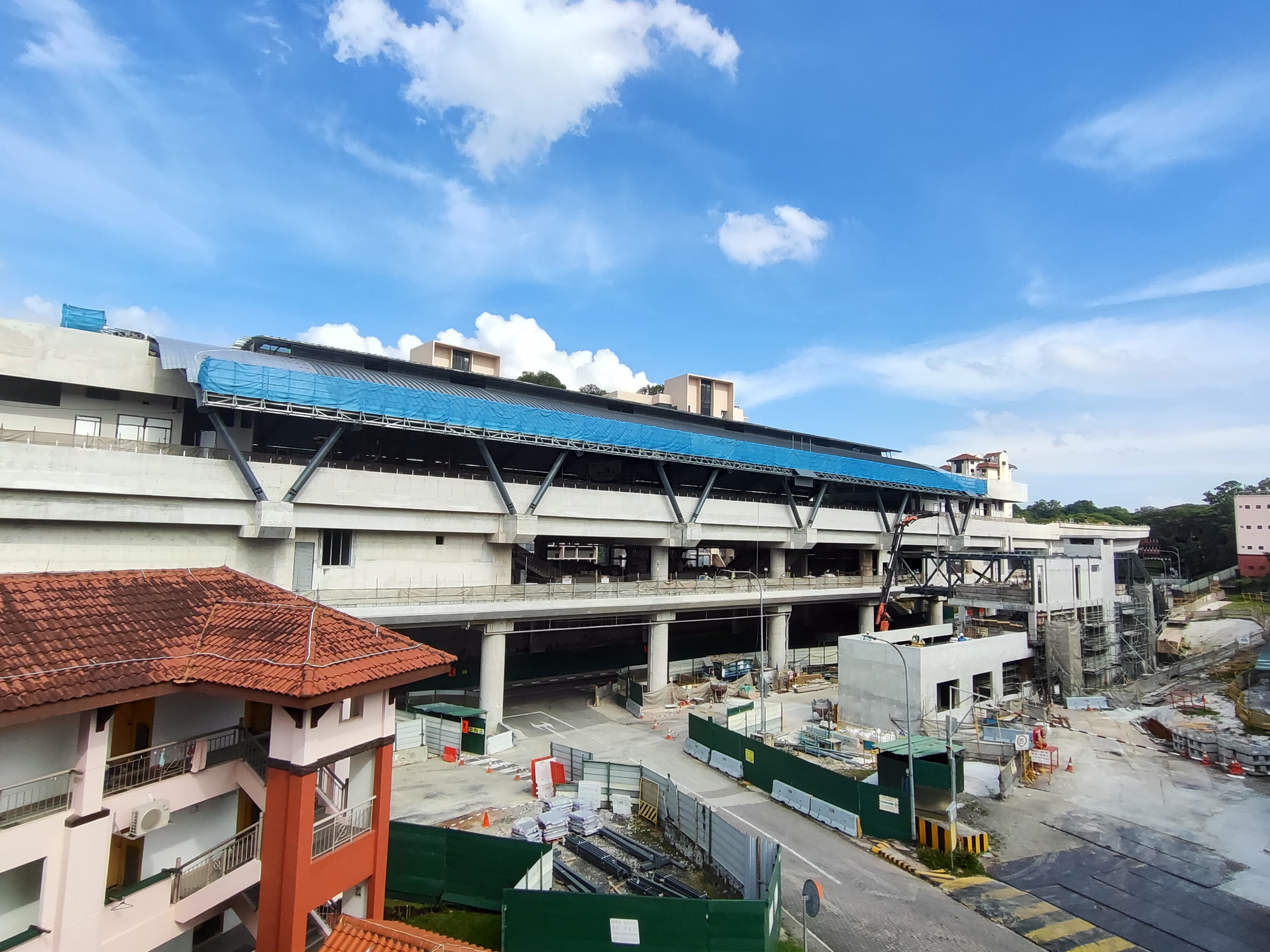
- Nanyang Gateway station under construction

General information
- Location: 18 Nanyang Avenue, Singapore 639957
- Coordinates: 01°21′13″N 103°41′12″E
- System: Future Mass Rapid Transit (MRT) station
- Owner: Land Transport Authority
- Operator: Singapore One Rail
- Line: Jurong Region Line
- Platforms: 2 (1 island platform)
- Tracks: 2
- Connections: Bus, Taxi

Construction
- Structure type: Elevated
- Platform levels: 1
- Parking: Yes
- Cycle facilities: Yes
- Accessible: Yes

Other information
- Station code: NYG

History
- Opening: 2029; 3 years' time

Services
| Preceding station | Mass Rapid Transit | Following station |
|---|---|---|
| Tawas towards Choa Chu Kang | Jurong Region Line Future service | Nanyang Crescent towards Peng Kang Hill |
Track layout
Location
- Location within Singapore Rail

Nanyang Gateway MRT station is a future elevated Mass Rapid Transit (MRT) station on the Jurong Region Line in Western Water Catchment, Singapore. The station will be located within the Nanyang Technological University (NTU).

== History ==
On 9 May 2018, the Land Transport Authority (LTA) announced that Nanyang Gateway station would be part of the proposed JRL. The station will be constructed as part of Phase 3, consisting of 7 stations – a 4 station extension to Jurong Pier from Boon Lay and a 3 station extension to Peng Kang Hill from Tawas. It was expected to be completed in 2028. However, the restrictions on construction due to the COVID-19 pandemic has led to delays, with the completion date pushed to 2029.

The contract for the design and construction of the Nanyang Gateway and Nanyang Crescent stations and 1.4 km (0.87 miles) of associated viaducts – Contract J113 – was awarded to Hwa Seng Builder Pte Ltd at S$263 million (US$192.8 million) on 6 April 2021. Construction is scheduled to start in the second quarter of 2021, with expected completion in 2029.

== Station details ==
The station will serve the JRL and will be located between the Tawas and Nanyang Crescent stations. The official station code will be JW3. The station will span over Nanyang Avenue and has four entrances, serving multiple NTU Halls of Residence and Staff Residences.
