= Singapore Rail Test Centre =

Railway testing facility in Singapore

Coordinates: 1°20′42″N 103°38′33″E

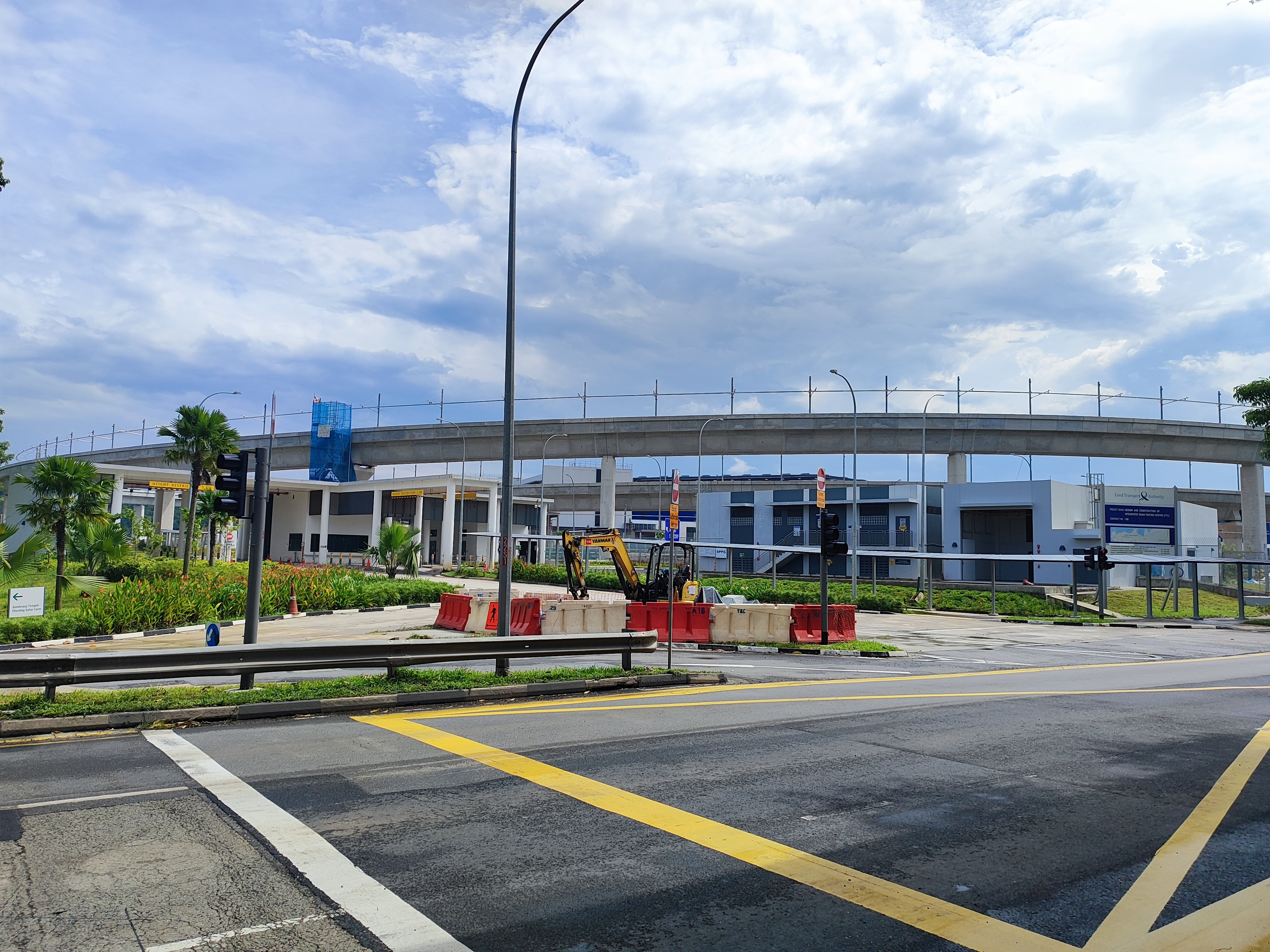
- The main entrance to the Singapore Rail Test Centre

Overview
- Native name: Malay: Pusat Ujian Kereta Api Singapura; Chinese: 新加坡铁路测试中心; Tamil: சிங்கப்பூர் ரயில் சோதனை நிலையம்
- Locale: Tuas, Singapore
- Transit type: Rail testing facility
- Headquarters: 450 Jalan Ahmad Ibrahim, Singapore 639932
- Website: Singapore Rail Test Centre

Operation
- Began operation: 2 November 2023; 3 years ago (partial completion); 28 March 2025; 19 months ago (full completion)

Technical
- System length: 16.9 km (10.5 mi)

The Singapore Rail Test Centre (SRTC) is a rail testing facility in Tuas, Singapore. Located on the former site of the Raffles Country Club and near Tuas Depot, the 54-hectare (130-acre) facility is used to test new rolling stock and rail systems for the Singapore MRT network, avoiding the need to conduct tests on operational lines. The SRTC is the first rail testing facility in Southeast Asia, featuring workshops, an operations control centre, an administration building and three tracks for safety tests.

The SRTC was first announced as the Integrated Train Testing Centre in April 2019, and construction began with a groundbreaking ceremony on 17 March 2021. The site was originally secured for the cancelled Kuala Lumpur–Singapore high-speed rail (HSR). Originally expected to be completed in phases from 2022 to 2024, the opening of the first phase was delayed to November 2023, and full operations commenced in March 2025.

== History ==
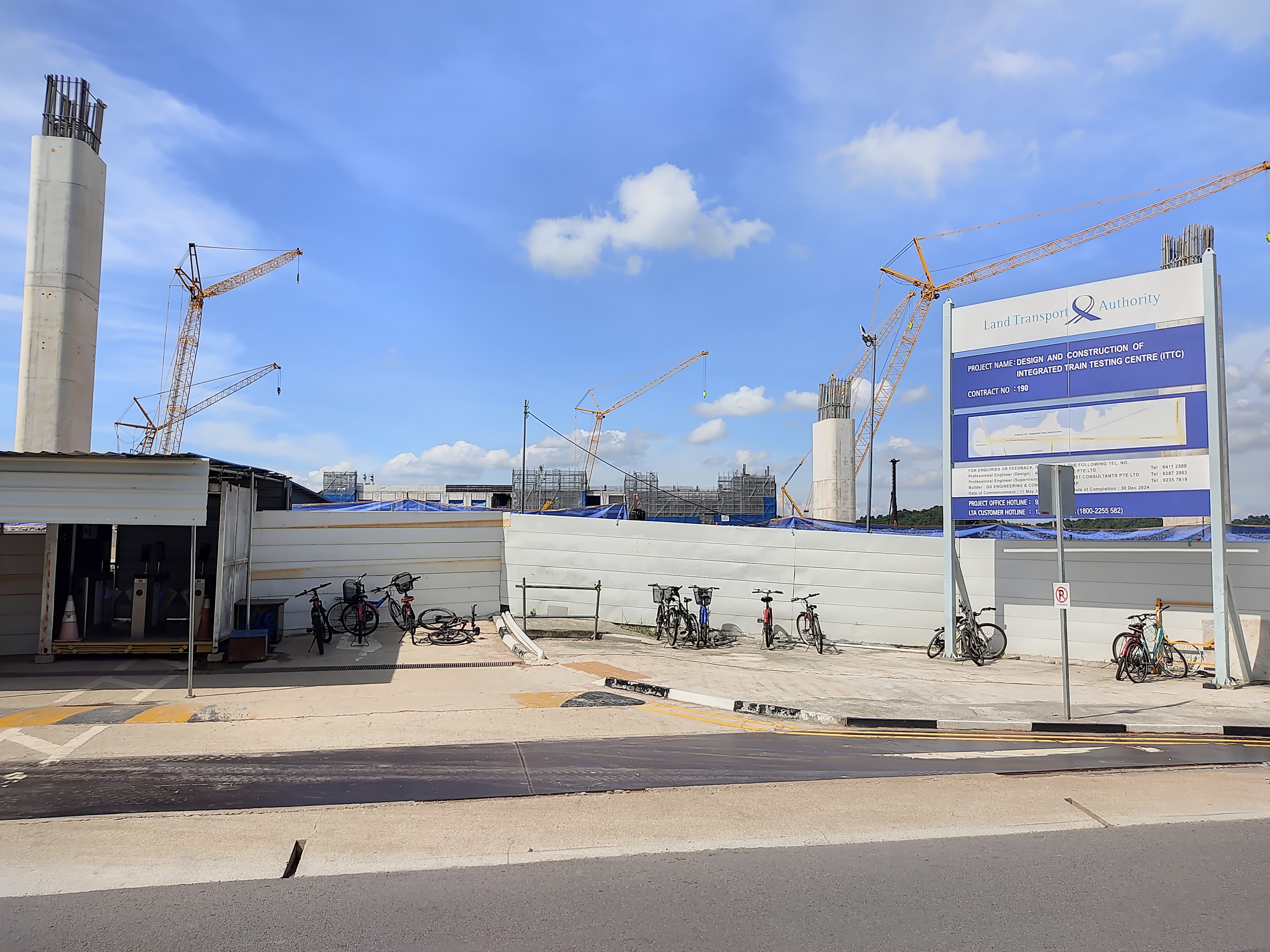
Construction site in May 2022

Prior to the establishment of the Singapore Rail Test Centre (SRTC), the bulk of testing of Singapore's rolling stock had to be conducted overseas. However, as these tests could not replicate Singapore's operating conditions, the new trains still required extensive testing on the operational lines.

The facility was first announced as the Integrated Train Testing Centre (ITTC) by transport minister Khaw Boon Wan on 24 April 2019. Khaw regarded the project as a "worthwhile investment" projected to cost several hundred million dollars, and said that the ITTC would allow testing of new railway systems without the need to close MRT lines. The facility was also intended to allow officials to develop deeper expertise in railway operations and maintenance.

The site was originally secured for the Kuala Lumpur–Singapore high-speed rail (HSR), and part of the HSR route was planned to run across the land from southwest to northeast. Part of the site would also be used for a depot for the Cross Island Line. However, when the HSR project was cancelled, Land Transport Authority (LTA) deputy CEO Chua Chong Kheng supported using the site for a testing facility instead. Contract 190 for the design and construction of the ITTC was awarded to GS Engineering & Construction in April 2020 for S$639.5 million (US$468.8 million). Construction of the ITTC officially began with a groundbreaking ceremony on 17 March 2021.

The testing centre was constructed in two phases. The first phase, which included the high-speed track, was initially planned to be completed by the end of 2022, allowing Circle Line Stage 6 trains to be tested in 2023. The ITTC was originally expected to be completed by the end of 2024, with the construction of two additional test tracks and other facilities. However, due to the COVID-19 pandemic, the scheduled completion dates were later postponed by one year to 2023 and 2025 respectively. To improve safety and efficiency in the construction, the contractor incorporated precast concrete and utilised Building Information Modelling technology to identify construction risks.

On 1 November 2022, the rolling stock test and research facility for the ITTC was over 50% completed, with trackwork for the high-speed test track nearly completed. The other facilities, including the operations control centre and the administration building, were expected to be completed in 2023. The LTA also signed a memorandum of understanding with the Global Centre of Rail Excellence to collaborate on developing train testing centres in Singapore and the United Kingdom.

In 2023, the ITTC was renamed the Singapore Rail Test Centre (SRTC). The first phase of the SRTC was completed and opened on 2 November of that year, and the testing and commissioning of the new Circle Line trains began at the facility the same month. Full operations of the facility commenced on 28 March 2025.

== Design ==
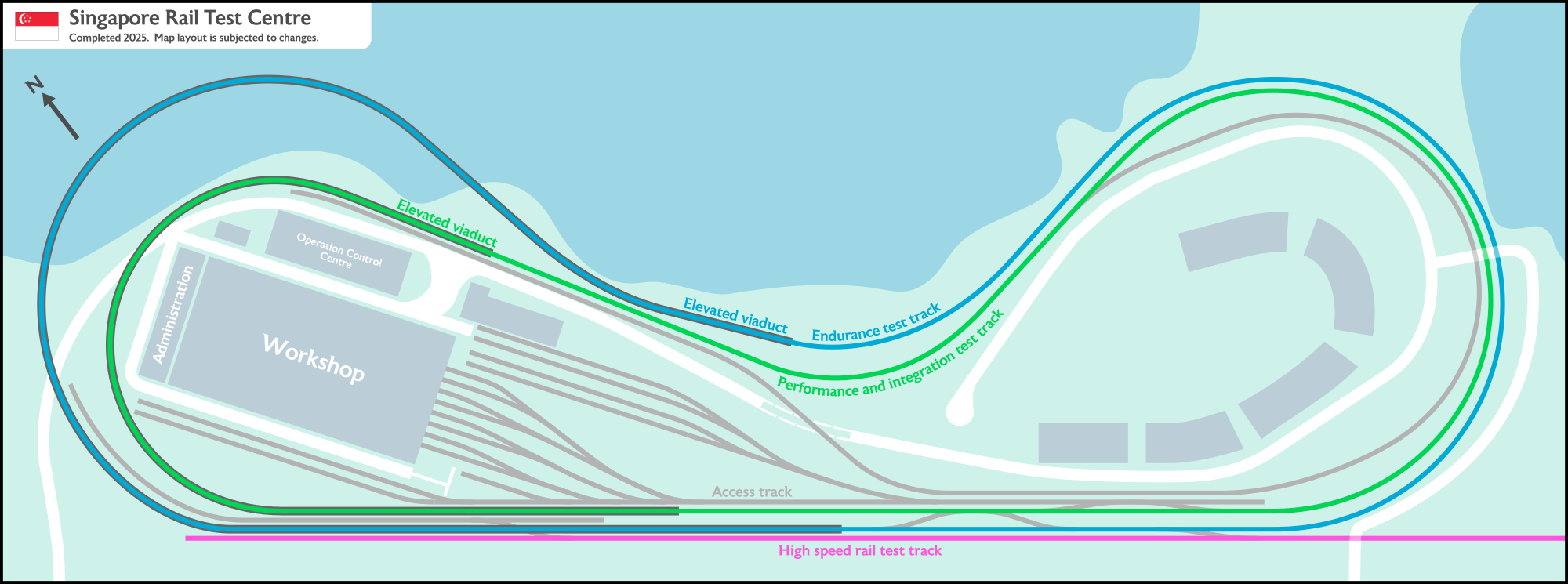
Map of the facility as depicted in early 2021 design documents

Spanning 54 hectares (130 acres), the SRTC is constructed on the former site of the Raffles Country Club in Tuas, which was originally acquired for the currently suspended Kuala Lumpur–Singapore high-speed rail project. The facility is close to the Tuas Depot.

The SRTC allows integrated systems testing for different trains and rail systems simultaneously, avoiding the need to conduct tests on operational lines. The LTA also intended for the SRTC to be a shared testing and maintenance centre where LTA engineers could collaborate with train operators and equipment manufacturers to improve rail systems in Singapore. The Korea Railroad Research Institute – which is responsible for the management and operation of a train test centre in Osong – was consulted in the design of the testing facility. The architectural design was undertaken by Ong&Ong, while Arup was responsible for the facility's mechanical and electrical engineering design. A three-level building houses the operations control centre, offices and workshops. The inspection and maintenance areas allow mid-life refurbishments of trains.

The SRTC has 16.9 kilometres (10.5 miles) of track, which is compatible with various types of signalling systems and is powered by both 750V direct-current third rail and 25kV alternating-current overhead catenary. The SRTC is planned to be linked with the East–West Line via a viaduct in 2029. The tracks include:

- A looped 3 km (1.9-mile) endurance track with a maximum 3% gradient for performance testing. Part of the track is elevated and runs over Tengah Reservoir. This ensures that the train's systems remain reliable and durable after reaching a set mileage.
- A looped 2.8 km (1.7-mile) S-curved track for performance and integration testing of rolling stock, assessing the train's ability to navigate bends.
- A 2.8 km (1.7-mile) straight high-speed track with minimal gradient that enables speed testing of up to 100 kilometres per hour (62 mph).
- Stabling and maintenance tracks for conducting major refurbishment of existing trains.

The SRTC is the first dedicated train testing facility in Southeast Asia. The facility received the Building and Construction Authority's Green Mark Platinum certification in recognition of its energy-efficient design, which includes features such as smart lighting control systems, solar panels, and a hybrid cooling system. The facility also includes bicycle parking facilities and sheltered linkways between various buildings to promote walking and cycling within the facility.

A viaduct link connecting the Tuas West Extension and the SRTC under Contract 1906 is slated to be completed by 2029.
