= Coastal fortifications of Singapore =

The first fortifications of Singapore consisted of batteries built in the early 19th century to protect the harbour and city. After this there were two main phases of building.

From the 1860s, technological changes started to render the existing fortifications obsolete. Steam-powered warships were faster and carried improved armour. Artillery also improved; Smooth Bore (SB) cannons were replaced by Rifled Muzzle Loading (RML) and then in the 1890s Breech Loading (BL) guns were introduced. These changes coupled with increased threats from Russia and France resulted in a need to upgrade the fortifications. The first phase was instigated by William Jervois whilst he was Governor of Singapore in the 1870s.

The second phase was prior to the Second World War and was to counter the threat posed by Japan with a building program implemented in 1933. The focus of the defences moved to the protection of the Eastern entrance to the Johore strait which guarded the entrance to the Singapore Naval Base. A number of the existing batteries were upgraded and new, more powerful, 15-inch guns and AMTB (anti motor torpedo boat) batteries were added to the fortress.

== The early fortifications of Singapore ==
| Name | Location | Armament | From | To | Notes |
|---|---|---|---|---|---|
| Scandal Point | Singapore Island 1.2913°N 103.8537°E | Armed with 12-pdr ML guns | 1819 | 1830 | Singapore's first fixed defence in use until Fort Fullerton was built in 1830. It continued in use after 1830 as a saluting battery |
| Prince's Battery | Singapore Island 1.2827°N 103.8516°E | It is unclear if this battery was ever armed | | | This battery was concurrent with Scandal Point Battery and Fort Fullerton |
| Fort Fullerton | Singapore Island 1.2864°N 103.8531°E | Initially armed in 1858 with 3 × 56-pdr and 2 × 32-pdr By 1863 these had been replaced with 9 × 68-pdr 95cwt In 1867 the fort was armed with 9 × 68-pdr cwt and 1 × 13-inch mortars | 1829 | 1873 | The fort was enlarged in 1859. Today, the Fullerton Hotel stands on the site once occupied by the fort. |
| Fort Palmer / Mount Palmer Battery | Singapore Island 1.2747°N 103.8483°E | In 1867 the fort was armed with 5 × 56-pdr Replaced by 3 × 7-inch 6.5-ton RML and 2 × 64-pdr RML By 1890 the fort mounted 2 × 10-inch Mk III BL | 1855 | 1905 | |
| Fort Canning | Singapore Island 1.2944°N 103.8469°E | In 1867 the fort was armed with 7 × 68-pdr, 8 × 8-inch and 2 × 13-inch mortars | 1859 | 1907 | In 1907 the fort was demolished and the site was used as military headquarters known as Headquarters Malaya Command and remained in military use until it was handed over to National Parks Board in 1960s. |
| Fort Faber | Singapore Island 1.2715°N 103.8193°E | In 1857 the fort was armed with 2 × 13-inch mortars In 1867 the fort was armed with 2 × 56-pdr and 2 × 13-inch mortars | Between 1857 and 1864 | c. 1870 | Abandoned c. 1870 reoccupied briefly in 1878 |
| Fort Teregh | Pulau Brani Island 1.2565°N 103.8354°E | Initially in 1887 2 × 7-inch RML guns replaced by 1890 with 2 × 64-pdr RML guns. Around 1891 2 × 6-pdr 22 cwt QF guns were added By 1900, only the 6-pdr 22 cwt QF remained | 1861 | 1907 | |

| 68-pounder smooth bore cannon | 1830 map of Singapore by John Murray | The gate at Fort Canning |

== Fortifications built between 1875 and 1910 ==
| Name | Location | Armament | From | To | Notes |
|---|---|---|---|---|---|
| Blakang Mati East Battery / Fort Connaught | Sentosa Island 1.2457°N 103.8378°E | 2 × 64-pdr RML - 1878 – c. 1886 3 × MK I 7 Inch RML 1878 – c. 1890 2 × MK IV 9.2-inch BL 1886 – c. 1936/37 2 × MK II 6-inch QF - 1890–1910 1 × MK X 9.2-inch BL 1910 - c .1936/7 3 × MK X 9.2-inch BL c.1936/37 – 1942 | 1878 | 1942 | Renamed Fort Connaught c. 1890 Site now occupied by Tanjong Golf Course |
| Fort Siloso | Sentosa Island 1.2592°N 103.8086°E | 2 × 64-pdr RML 1879 – c. 1886 3 × 7-inch RML 1879–1896 One gun removed c. 1891 1 × MK IV 9.2-inch BL 1896 – c. 1908 2 × 12-pdr QF 1899–1907 1 × 12-pdr QF as AMTB remounted prior to WW2 2 × 6-inch QF 1900–1942 upgraded to MK V11 6-inch in 1932 1 × Twin 6-pdr 1948–1950 2 × Mark XXIV 6 Inch BL 1950–1956 | 1879 | 1956 | All armament rendered unusable in 1942 |
| Fort Tanjong Katong | Singapore Island 1.2968°N 103.8867°E | 3 × 7-inch RML 1879–1885 2 × MK VII 8-inch BL 1885–1901 | 1879 | 1901 | The fort was disarmed around 1901 and demolished sometime after WW1 |
| Fort Pasir Panjang | Singapore Island 1.2659°N 103.8028°E | Initially 2 × 7-inch RML 1878 increased to 3 by 1886 prior to being removed by 1900 2 × MK IV 9·2-inch BL 1886–1912 1 × 6-pdr QF 1891–1912 a second 6-pdr QF added c. 1902 | 1886 | 1912 | The fort was disarmed by 1912. Labrador Battery was built above the casemates. |
| Mount Serapong | Sentosa Island 1.2511°N 103.8338°E | 2 × MK VII 8"-inch BL from 1887 to 1909 2 × MK X 9.2-inch BL from 1910 to c. 1936/37 | 1887 | c. 1936/37 | After World War 2 Mount Serapong became Keppel Fire Command |
| Mount Imbiah | Sentosa Island 1.2569°N 103.8144°E | 1 × MK X 9.2-inch BL 1912–1937 | 1890 | 1937 | Initially an infantry redoubt |
| Batu Berlayar Battery | Singapore Island 1.26299°N 103.8050°E | 1 × 6-pdr QF c. 1892 with a second being by 1898 From around 1905 the site was unarmed 2 × 12-pdr QF were deployed by 1942 Replaced with 1 × Twin 6-pdr 1946–1956 | 1892 | 1956 | The guns were rendered unusable in Feb 1942 After the war Batu Berlayar was repaired and rearmed with one Twin 6 Pounder |
| Berhala Reping Battery | Berhala Reping Island 1.2530°N 103.8377°E | 2 × 6-pdr QF 1894–1910 Replaced with 2 × 12-pdr till 1941 Replaced with 2 × Twin 6-pdr 1941–1942 Replaced with 1 × Twin 6-pdr 1946–1956 | 1894 | 1956 | AMTB Battery The guns were rendered unusable in Feb 1942 After the WW2 Berhala Reping was repaired and rearmed with one Twin 6 Pounder |
| Sillingsing Battery | Pulau Brani Island 1.2595°N 103.8340°E | 2 × 12-pdr QF 1899–1907 2 × MKII 6-inch QF c. 1910 – c. 1936/37 2 × BL MK VII 6-inch c. 1936/37 – 1942 | 1899 | 1942 | |
| Serapong Spur Battery | Sentosa Island 1.2505°N 103.8355°E | 1 × MK X 9.2-inch BL 1910 – c. 1936/37 2 × BL MK VII 6-inch c. 1936/37 – 1942 | c. 1910 | 1942 | |

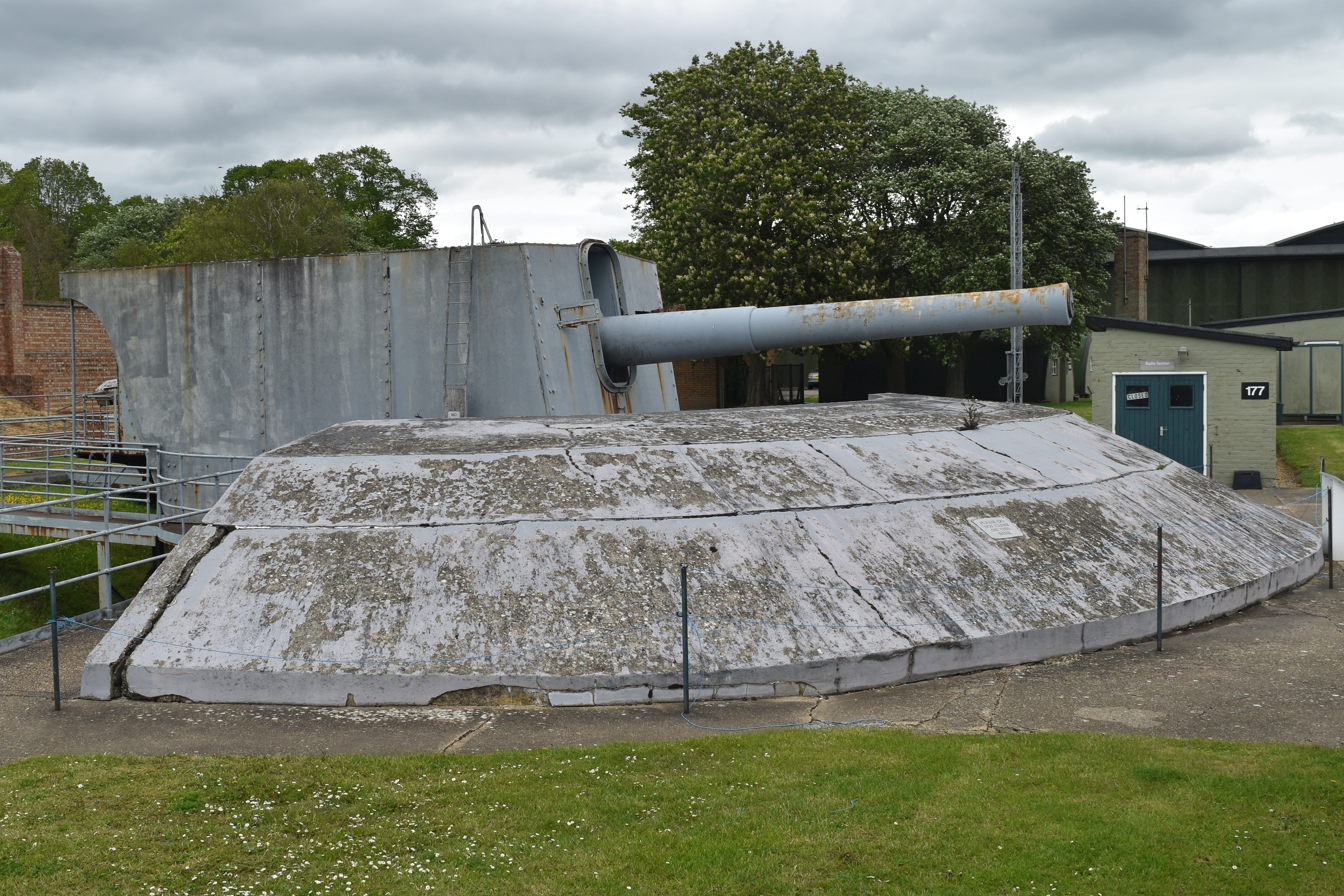
9.2-inch coastal defence gun – IWM Duxford

== World War II coastal batteries ==
| Name | Location | Armament | From | To | Notes |
|---|---|---|---|---|---|
| Pasir Laba Battery | Western Coast Singapore Island 1.3565°N 103.6419°E | 2 × BL MK VII 6-inch | 1936 | 1942 | Now it is currently part of SAFTI Live Firing Area but historical sites and traces of it do remain. |
| Beting Kusah Battery | Changi Singapore Island 1.37256°N 103.991°E | 2 × BL MK VII 6-inch | c. 1936/37 | 1942 | Now it is currently part of Changi Airport |
| Labarador Battery | Singapore Island 1.2659°N 103.8028°E | 2 × BL MK VII 6-inch | 1937 | 1942 | Built on the site of Fort Pasir Panjang |
| Pulau Ubin Battery | Pulau Ubin 1.4189°N 103.9727°E | Not armed | c. 1936/37 | N/A | AMTB Battery built for two Twin 6-pounders, but was never armed. |
| Tekong Besar Battery | Pulau Tekong Besar 1.3995°N 104.0582°E | 3 × MK X 9.2-inch BL | c. 1936/37 | 1942 | Now part of the restricted military training area for BMT (Basic Military Training), although historical traces do remain. |
| Sphinx Battery | Pulau Tekong Basar 1.3978°N 104.0397°E | 2 × MK XXIV 6-inch BL | c. 1936/37 | 1942 | Now part of the restricted military training area for BMT (Basic Military Training), although historical traces do remain. |
| Tanjong Terah | Pulau Brani Island 1.2592°N 103.8351°E | Not armed | c. 1938/39 | N/A | AMTB Battery built for one twin 6-pounders, but was never armed. |
| Changi School / Inner Harbour Battery | Changi Singapore Island 1.3918°N 103.9848°E | Not armed | c. 1938/39 | N/A | Also known as Changi School Battery due to the proximity of school AMTB Battery built for two twin 6-pounders, but was never armed. |
| Changi Palm / Outer Harbour Battery | Changi Singapore Island 1.3883°N 103.9984°E | 2 × 6-pdr 1941–1942 | c. 1938/39 | 1942 | Also known as Changi Palm Battery due to the palm trees AMTB Battery built for 2 twin 6-pdrs It was armed with two 6-pdrs in 1941 |
| Ladang Battery | Pulau Tekong Basar 1.4067°N 104.0285°E | 1 × 12-pdr QF | 1938 | 1942 | AMTB Battery built for a Twin 6-pounder but armed with a 12-pounder in 1942. |
| Pengerang Battery | Johore - Malaysia 1.3750°N 104.0997°E | 2 × BL MK VII 6-inch c. 1939–1942 2 × 18-pdr c. 1941–1942 | 1939 | 1942 | 2 × 18-pdr as part of beach defence |
| Buona Vista Battery | Singapore Island 1.3208°N 103.7715°E | 2 × MK I 15-inch BL | 1939 | 1942 | Now became Pine Grove. |
| Johore Battery | Changi Singapore Island 1.3651°N 103.9766°E | 3 × MK I 15-inch BL | 1939 | 1942 | Now it is currently part of Changi Airport - There is a replica of the No 1 which is open to the public |
| Pulau Hantu Battery | Keppel Island 1.2636°N 103.8108°E | 1 × 18-pdr Field gun | | 1942 | Built as an AMTB Battery an 18 Pounder was mounted here during WWII. |
| Pulau Sejahat Battery | Pulau Sejahat 1.4010°N 104.0201°E | 2 × Twin 6-pdr QF | | 1942 | AMTB Battery |
| Changi Battery | Changi Singapore Island 1.3912°N 103.9841°E | 2 × BL MK VII 6-inch | | 1942 | The radar station for Changi Airport now occupies this site |
| Calder Harbour Battery | Pulau Tekong Basar 1.4187°N 104.0800°E | 2 × Twin 6-pdr QF | | 1942 | Now part of the restricted military training area for BMT (Basic Military Training), although historical traces do remain. |

| One of Singapore's 15-inch coastal defence guns elevated for firing | BL 6-Inch Mk VII gun and crew Fort Siliso | Fort Siliso – Sentosa Island Singapore |

== Fortress Singapore during World War II ==
The main purpose of the guns was to prevent an attack on Singapore Island and the important Naval Base from the sea. A popular myth after the loss of Singapore in February 1942 was that the guns were "impressive but useless: the guns on Singapore pointed the wrong way" and hence could not fire on the advancing Japanese. In reality this was not true. By 1939 most of the batteries had been modified to improve their arcs of fire. During the Battle of Singapore a number of batteries were actively engaged firing over 2000 shells (Changi Fire Command consumed an estimated 1,119 shells and Faber Fire Command 1,072).

The fire of the guns, however, was not that effective; armour-piercing (AP) ammunition was more suitable for use against ships, and that the necessary fire control preparations had not been made.

Prior to the surrender the garrison rendered all guns unusable. This activity was very successful and the Japanese were only able to repair 4 of the 52 guns that had been in use.

Fixed Defences for Fortress Singapore were under the command of Brigadier A.D. Curtis who had three Royal Artillery Regiments manning the guns: The 7th and 9th Coast Regiments and the 16th Defence Regiment. These regiments included three batteries manned by the Hong Kong and Singapore Royal Artillery (HKSRA)

Faber Fire Command - Under Command of Lt. Col. Hereward Douglas St. George Cardew and was manned by the 7th Coast Regiment, Royal Artillery. The fire command controlled the guns protecting the South of the Island and Singapore City

| Unit | Battery name | World War II – armament | Saw action |
|---|---|---|---|
| 5th Bty HKSRA | Sillingsing Battery | 2 × MK VII 6-inch BL | |
| 5th Bty HKSRA 11th Coast Bty RA | Siliso Battery | 2 × MK VII 6-inch BL 1 × 12-pdr | Yes |
| 7th Bty HKSRA | Pasir Laba Battery | 2 × MK VII 6-inch BL | Yes |
| 7th Bty HKSRA | Labarador Battery | 2 × MK VII 6-inch BL | Yes |
| 11th Coast Bty RA | Connaught Battery | 3 × MK X 9.2-inch | Yes |
| 11th Coast Bty RA | Serapong Spur Battery | 2 × MK VII 6-inch BL | |
| 11th Coast Bty RA | Pulau Hantu Battery | 1 × 18-pdr field gun | |
| 11th Coast Bty RA | Berhala Reping Battery | 2 × Twin 6-pdr | |
| 31st Coast Bty RA | Buona Vista Battery | 2 × MK I 15-inch | |
| 31st Coast Bty RA | Batu Berlayar Battery | 2 × 12-pdr | |

Changi Fire Command - Under command Lt. Col. Charles Philip Heath and was manned by the 9th Coast Regiment, Royal Artillery. The fire command controlled the Eastern approaches of the Island and protected the entrance to the Johore Strait and the Naval Base.

| Unit | Battery name | World War II – armament | Saw action |
|---|---|---|---|
| 7th Coast Bty RA | Johore Battery | 3 × MK I 15-inch | Yes |
| 7th Coast Bty RA | Beting Kusah Battery | 2 × MK VII 6-inch BL | |
| 22nd Coast Bty RA | Tekong Battery | 3 × MK X 9.2-inch | Yes |
| 22nd Coast Bty RA | Sphinx Battery | 2 × MK XXIV 6-inch | Yes |
| 22nd Coast Bty RA | Ladang Battery | 1 × 12-pdr | |
| 22nd Coast Bty RA | Pulau Sejahat Battery | 2 × Twin 6-pdr | |
| 32nd Coast Bty RA | Changi Battery | 2 × MK VII 6-inch BL | Yes |
| 32nd Coast Bty RA | Pengerang Battery | 2 × MK VII 6-inch BL 2 × 18-pdr | |
| 32nd Coast Bty RA | Changi Outer Harbour Battery | 2 × Twin 6-pdr | |
| 32nd Coast Bty RA | Calder Harbour Battery | 2 × Twin 6-pdr | |

The 16th Defence Regiment, Royal Artillery – under command of Lt. Col. M.S.H. Maxwell-Gumbleton – had two batteries of 18-pdrs (966 and 968 Defence Batteries) and 1 battery of 2-pdr (967 Defence Battery).

It was planned to use the 18-pdrs in pairs for beach defence. Twenty-four Beach Defence (BD) positions were planned with BD1 was located near Pasir Laba Battery and BD24 was at Pengerang. It is not clear how many of these were actually deployed.

== Postwar batteries ==
Keppel Fire Command - Mount Serapong

| Name | Postwar armament | Dates |
|---|---|---|
| Siliso Battery | 1 × Twin 6-pdr 1948–1950 2 × Mark XXIV 6-inch BL 1950–1956 | c. 1948 – c. 1956 |
| Batu Berlayar Battery | 1 × twin 6-pdr | c. 1946 – c. 1956 |
| Berhala Reping Battery | 1 × twin 6-pdr | c. 1946 – c. 1956 |
