= JW =

JW may refer to:

- Jack Wills, a British clothing brand
- Jehovah's Witnesses, a Christian denomination
- Jurong West, a town in Singapore
- Justizwache, a branch of the Austrian Ministry of Justice responsible for safeguarding prisons and court buildings
- JW, a patient with a "split brain"
- JW, a catalogue of works by Leoš Janáček
- Vanilla Air (2013–2019, IATA code JW), a Japanese airline
- Arrow Air (1947–2010), an American cargo airline
- JW (Hong Kong singer), a Hong Kong singer and actress
- ⟨jʷ⟩, IPA for a voiced labial–palatal approximant
- JW, formerly Jeans West, a former division of Edison Brothers Stores
- JW Marriott Hotels, an American-based hotel chain

== See also ==
- WJ (disambiguation)
