= Tawas MRT station =

Future Mass Rapid Transit station in Singapore

Tawas JW2 大华士 தாவாஸ்
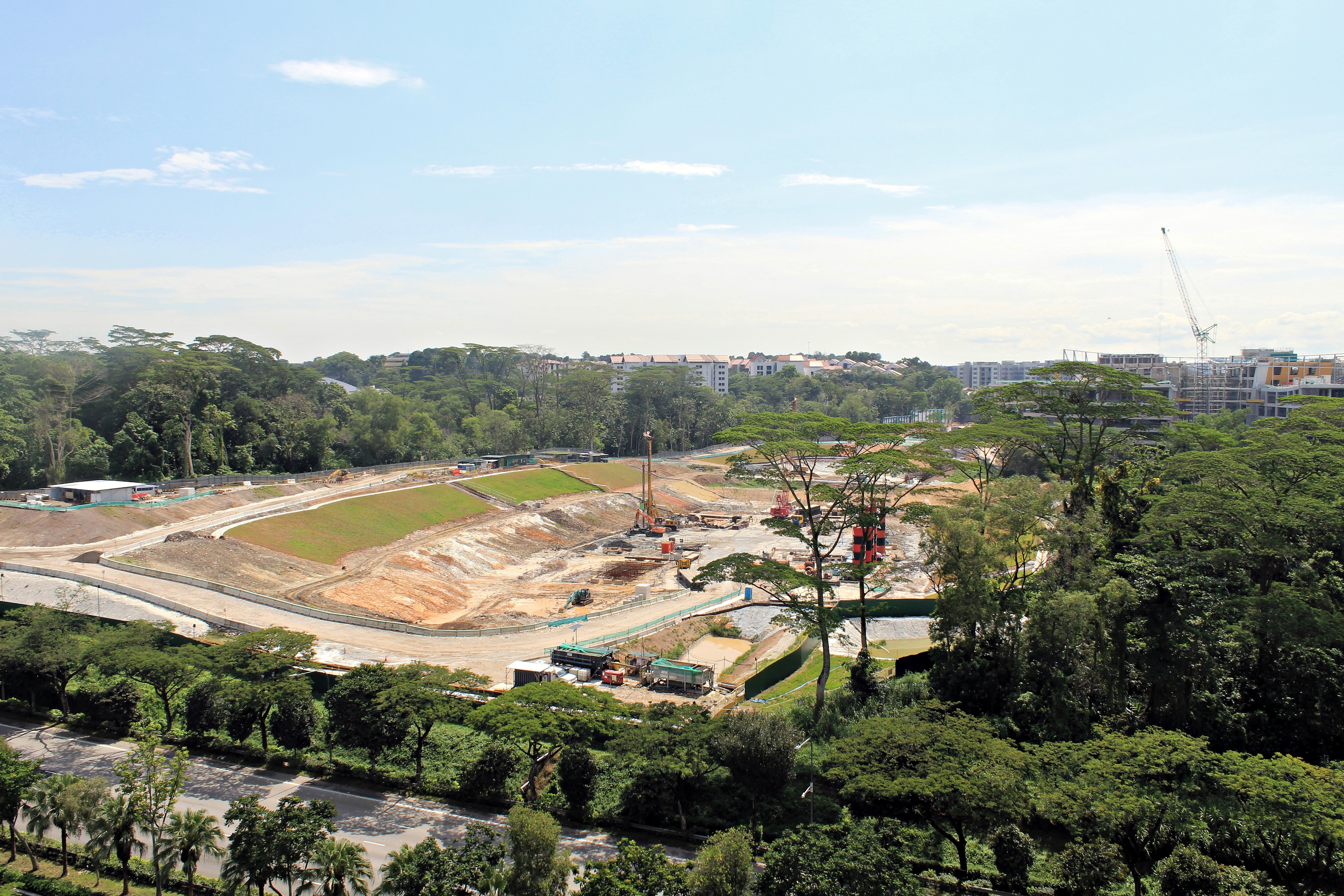
- Tawas MRT station site

General information
- Coordinates: 01°21′02″N 103°41′31″E
- System: Future Mass Rapid Transit (MRT) station
- Owner: Land Transport Authority
- Operator: Singapore One Rail
- Line: Jurong Region Line
- Platforms: 2 (2 side platforms)
- Tracks: 2
- Connections: Bus, Taxi

Construction
- Structure type: Elevated
- Platform levels: 1
- Parking: Yes
- Cycle facilities: Yes
- Accessible: Yes

Other information
- Station code: TWS

History
- Opening: mid-2028; 2 years' time

Services
Preceding station	Mass Rapid Transit	Following station
Gek Poh towards Choa Chu Kang	Jurong Region Line Future service	Terminus
Gek Poh towards Choa Chu Kang	Jurong Region Line Future service	Nanyang Gateway towards Peng Kang Hill
Track layout
Location
- Location within Singapore Rail

Tawas MRT station is a future elevated Mass Rapid Transit (MRT) station on the Jurong Region Line in Western Water Catchment, Singapore.

Derived from the namesake road nearby, Lorong Tawas, it will be the northern terminus of the West Branch of the Jurong Region Line from mid-2028 to 2029 before Peng Kang Hill MRT station opens. There will be two station names in the naming exercise - Tawas and Cleantech. Trains entering service at this station will terminate at Choa Chu Kang via Bahar Junction.

== History ==
On 9 May 2018, the Land Transport Authority (LTA) announced that Tawas station would be part of the proposed Jurong Region Line (JRL). The station will be constructed as part of Phase 1, JRL (West), consisting of 10 stations between Choa Chu Kang, Boon Lay and Tawas, and is expected to be completed in mid-2028.

Contract J107 for the design and construction of Tawas Station and associated viaducts was awarded to Sembcorp Design and Construction Pte Ltd at a sum of S$226.6 million (US$166.1 million). Construction will start in 2020, with completion in mid-2028. Contract J107 also includes the design and construction of Gek Poh, and associated viaducts.

Initially expected to open in 2026, the restrictions on the construction due to the COVID-19 pandemic has led to delays in the JRL line completion, and the date was pushed to 2027. Due to construction and testing delays, the completion date was further delayed to mid-2028.

== Location ==
The station complex will be situated at JTC CleanTech Park. It is located within the Western Water Catchment planning area, to the west of the Jurong Eco-Garden.

Access to the station will be via 4 exits.
