= Maju MRT station =

Future Mass Rapid Transit station in Singapore

Maju CR16 马裕 மாஜு
- Artist's impression of Maju MRT station

General information
- Coordinates: 01°19′42″N 103°46′37″E
- System: Future Mass Rapid Transit (MRT) station
- Owner: Land Transport Authority
- Line: Cross Island Line
- Platforms: 2 (1 island platform)
- Connections: Bus, Taxi

Construction
- Structure type: Underground
- Accessible: Yes

Other information
- Station code: MJU

History
- Opening: 2032; 6 years' time

Services
Preceding station	Mass Rapid Transit	Following station
King Albert Park towards Aviation Park	Cross Island Line Future service	Clementi towards Jurong Lake District
Location
- Location within Singapore Rail

Maju MRT station is a future underground Mass Rapid Transit station on the Cross Island Line (CRL) located in Bukit Timah, Singapore. First announced in September 2022, the station is expected to be completed in 2032 along with the other CRL Phase 2 stations.

== History ==
Maju station was first announced on 20 September 2022 by Transport Minister S Iswaran. The station will be constructed as part of Phase 2 of the Cross Island Line (CRL), a 15-kilometre (9.3 mi) segment spanning six stations from Turf City station to Jurong Lake District station. The station is expected to be completed in 2032.

The announcement of the station drew mixed reactions from residents in the area who live a distance from the future station. Besides the existing institutions, the station does not serve any other amenities including shops or eateries which might make the station inconvenient to use. On the other hand, the dean of the nearby Singapore University of Social Sciences (SUSS) praised that the station would improve transport connections to the school and alleviate traffic congestion on the road.

The contract for the construction of Maju station and associated tunnels was awarded to KTC Civil Engineering & Construction Pte Ltd for S$480 million (US$358.21 million) in January 2024. Construction of the new station was scheduled to begin in the second quarter of 2024 and be completed in 2032.

== Details ==
The station will serve the Cross Island Line (CRL) and have an official station code of CR16. It will be located next to Ngee Ann Polytechnic, the Singapore Institute of Management and the Singapore University of Social Sciences. The station would also serve the Sunset Way estate.
