= Changi (disambiguation) =

Changi is the area in eastern Singapore.

Changi may also refer to:

- Changi (musical instrument), traditional in Georgia
- Changi (TV series)
- Changi, Iran, a village in Tehran Province
- Changi Air Base
- Changi Airport in Singapore
- Changi Airport MRT station
- Changi Airport Skytrain
- Changi Business Park
- Changi Depot
- Changi Exhibition Centre
- Changi East Depot
- Changi General Hospital
- Changi Murals, painted by Stanley Warren in Changi Prison 1942-1943
- Changi Naval Base
- Changi Prison
- Changi Sailing Club
- Changi Terminal 5 MRT station
- Changi Tree, a notably tall tree in Changi
- Changi University, the nickname of a program of education for detainees in the Changi Prisoner of War camp during World War II
- Changi Village
- Upper Changi MRT station
