= King Albert Park MRT station =

Mass Rapid Transit station in Singapore

King Albert Park DT6 CR15 阿尔柏王园 கிங் ஆல்பர்ட் பார்க்
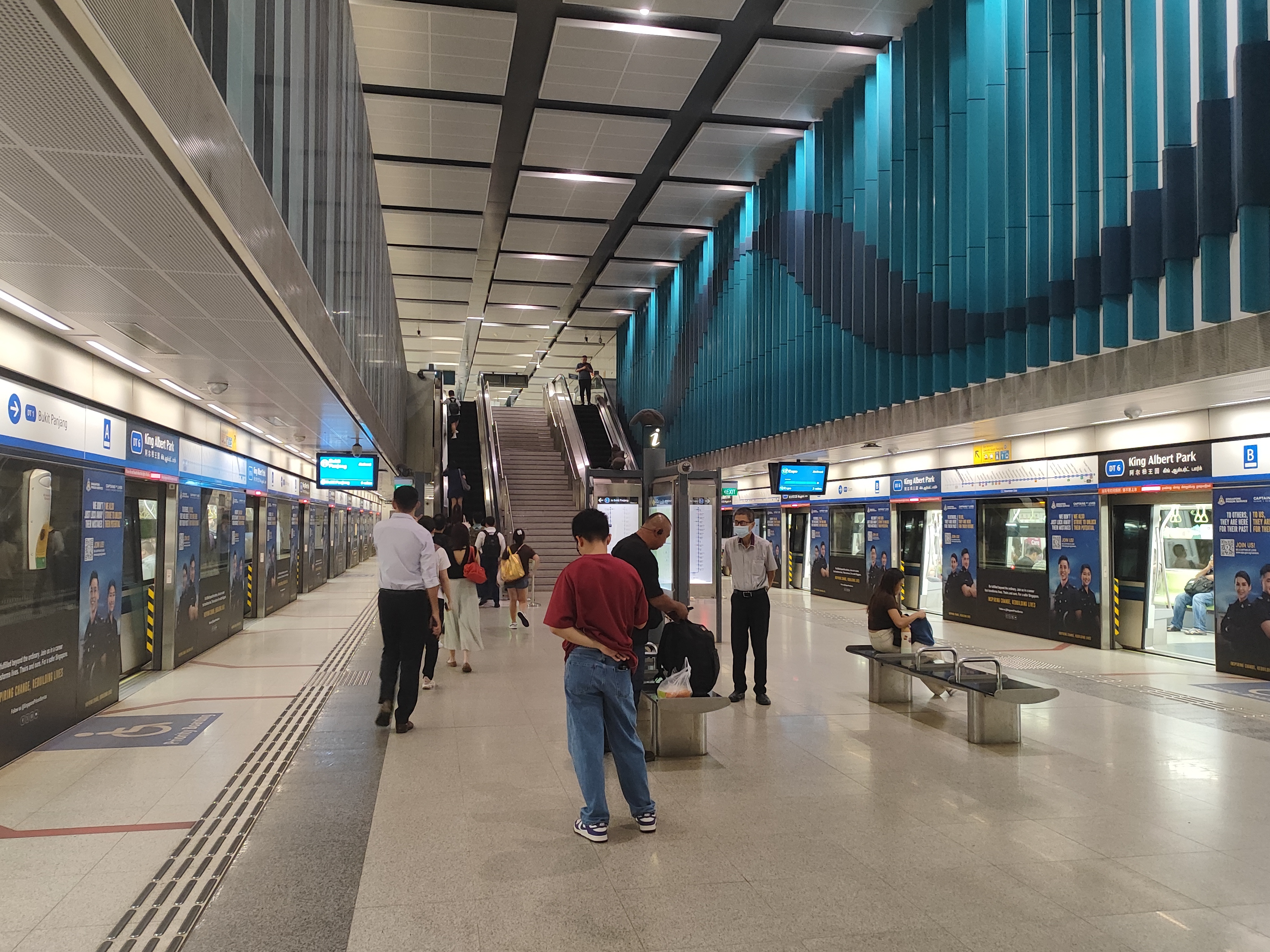
- Platform level of King Albert Park station

General information
- Location: 2 Blackmore Drive, Singapore 599987
- Coordinates: 01°20′09″N 103°47′01″E
- System: Mass Rapid Transit (MRT) station
- Owner: Land Transport Authority
- Operator: SBS Transit (Downtown Line)
- Line: Downtown Line Cross Island Line
- Platforms: 2 (1 island platform) + 2 (1 island platform) (U/C)
- Tracks: 2 + 2 (U/C)
- Connections: Bus, Taxi

Construction
- Structure type: Underground
- Depth: 50 metres (160 ft)
- Platform levels: 1
- Cycle facilities: Yes
- Accessible: Yes

History
- Opened: 27 December 2015; 10 years ago (Downtown Line)
- Opening: 2032; 6 years' time (Cross Island Line)
- Former names: Blackmore, Bukit Timah

Passengers
- June 2024: 5,658 per day

Services
Preceding station	Mass Rapid Transit	Following station
Beauty World towards Bukit Panjang	Downtown Line	Sixth Avenue towards Expo
Turf City towards Aviation Park	Cross Island Line Future service	Maju towards Jurong Lake District
Track layout
Location
- Location within Singapore Rail

King Albert Park MRT station is an underground Mass Rapid Transit (MRT) station on the Downtown Line (DTL) in Bukit Timah, Singapore. Located at the western end of Bukit Timah Road at the junction of Blackmore Drive, this station serves the private residential estates along the Bukit Timah corridor. Sites surrounding the station include Methodist Girls' School, Ngee Ann Polytechnic, and the preserved Bukit Timah railway station.

First announced as Blackmore MRT station in July 2008, the station was constructed as part of DTL Stage 2 (DTL2). Construction was briefly delayed due to residents' concerns of the tunnel launch shaft near their estate, and the sudden bankruptcy of contractor Alpine Bau. Initially forecast to open in mid-2016, the station opened earlier on 27 December 2015 along with the other DTL2 stations. In September 2022, the station was announced to interchange with the future Cross Island Line (CRL). The CRL station will be the deepest MRT station on the network at 50 metres (160 ft) underground. The DTL station features an Art-in-Transit artwork The Natural History of Singapore's Mythical Botanic Creatures by the Artists Caravan.

== History ==
=== Downtown Line ===
The station was first announced as "Blackmore" station when the stations on Downtown Line Stage 2 (DTL2) were revealed in July 2008. The station name was finalised as "King Albert Park" through a public poll in July 2009. Contract 917 for the design and construction of the station and the adjacent tunnels was awarded to Alpine Bau GmbH (Singapore Branch) in September 2009. The S$350 million (US$240.7 million) contract included the construction of the adjacent Sixth Avenue station. Construction was targeted to begin in 2010.

Construction works had to be suspended for two months over Maplewood residents' concerns about the tunnel boring machine (TBM) launch shaft located right outside the condominium. The construction space required pedestrians to take an alternative route which residents considered "dangerous" and "inconvenient" especially for Methodist Girls' School (MGS) students due to the movement of construction vehicles. Motorists exiting the condominium had to watch out and give way to fast-moving traffic along Bukit Timah Road. The new construction site also limited access for service and emergency vehicles to the condominium. Unhappy that they were not consulted, the residents launched a petition to prime minister Lee Hsien Loong while some appealed to the local Member of Parliament (MP) Christopher de Souza to change the construction plans.

Residents had suggested relocating the TBM launch shaft to Sixth Avenue station. However, the Land Transport Authority (LTA) explained that would require demolishing the shophouses. Another suggestion to drill the tunnels from Tan Kah Kee station would delay construction by another four years. Souza and the LTA, through engagements with the Maplewood residents, offered to rebuild a new direct pathway between the condominium and MGS and reconfigure the traffic to and from the condominium.

Eventually, road markings and traffic lights were implemented along Bukit Timah Road so traffic on the road would have to slow down near the condo. Noise barriers were erected to minimise construction noise and the construction site was regularly washed to minimise dust accumulation. The traffic scheme was revised so construction vehicles do not have to pass by the condominium. Construction resumed in the middle of July 2011.

A 14 m (46 ft) precast segment of the Bukit Timah canal wall near the junction of Bukit Timah Road and Clementi Road was dislodged, which prompted a halt in construction works and the closure of the rightmost two lanes on Bukit Timah Road on 17 January 2012. Cement had to be injected to stabilise the ground.

==== Bankruptcy of main contractor ====
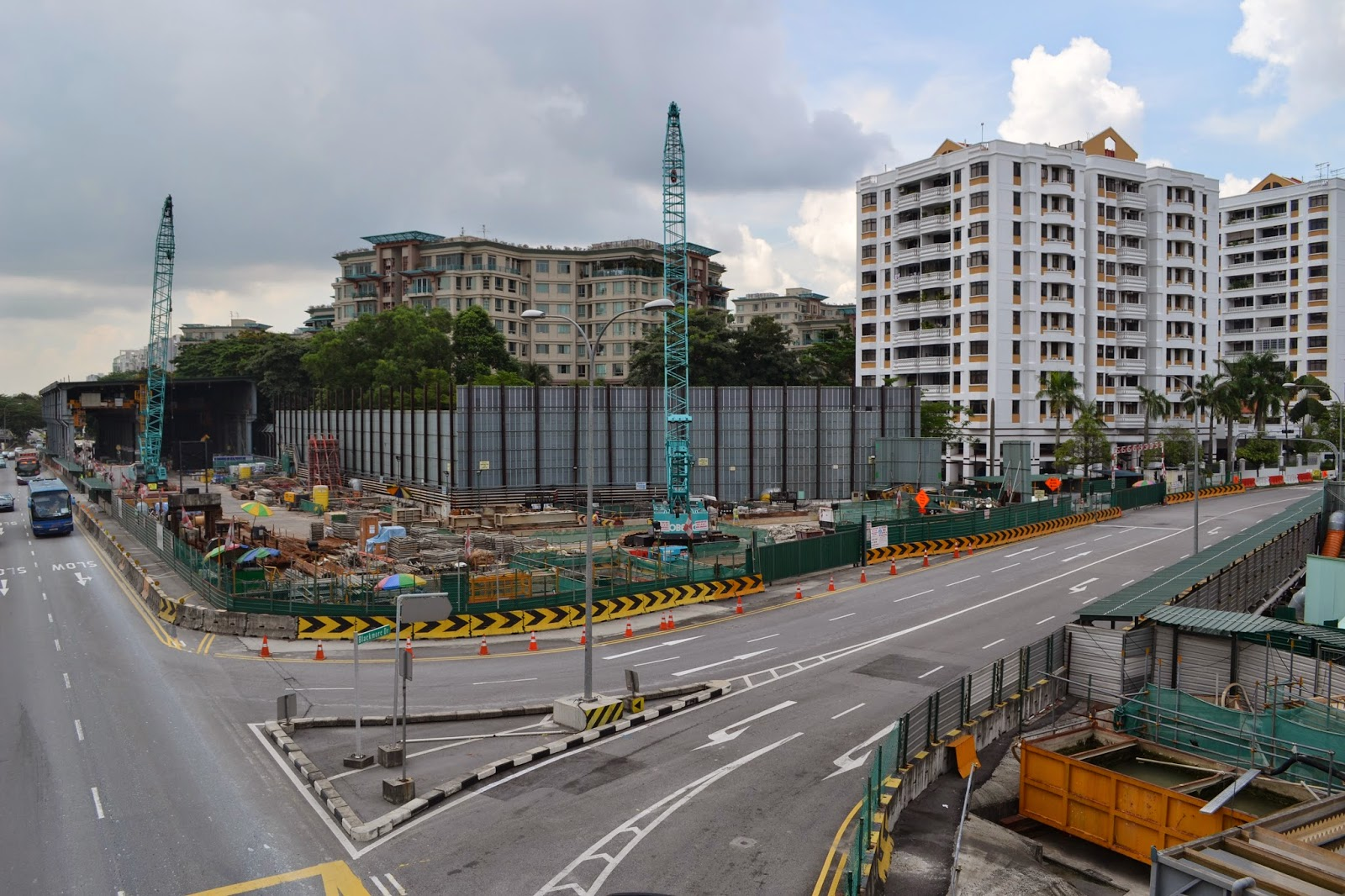
Construction site of the station

On 19 June 2013, Alpine Bau, the main contractor for the station, went bankrupt. The sudden insolvency caught the LTA by surprise, as the construction was going well by then. An "unprecedented situation", the LTA immediately took action. A security firm was employed to protect the sites and the incomplete structures, while the LTA worked with experts to preserve the tunnel boring machines and recharge wells. As the LTA sought a new contractor, McConnell Dowell South East Asia, the contractor for Beauty World station, was temporarily appointed as the caretaker contractor to carry on tunnelling works. Through engagement with the Ministry of Manpower, the 400 affected workers were either reassigned or repatriated.

On 29 August 2013, the LTA announced the appointment of two new contractors for King Albert Park and the two other stations. The contract for the completion of the King Albert Park and Sixth Avenue stations and associated tunnels was awarded to McConnell Dowell at a contract sum of $254 million (US$203 million). The contractors were appointed just eight weeks after the insolvency, whereas usually, a tender needed at least six months for evaluation and processing. The quick appointment was to reduce the delay in the completion of DTL2.

To speed up the construction as much as possible, manpower for the construction of these stations increased by 25%, with workers taking up additional graveyard shifts so that work could continue throughout the day and night. To reduce inconvenience to residents, rather than using conventional breakers, quieter wire saws were utilised to break up the concrete struts.

On 28 June 2015, Transport Minister Lui Tuck Yew announced that the DTL2 would be opened earlier, with the works 95% complete. The LTA managed to bring forward the completion as the staff worked through many weekends and "sleepless nights". The engineers were reported to be "equally proud and relieved" of the achievement and they were credited for their cooperation and hard work. In August that year, Lui announced that the DTL2 segment would open on 27 December. Prior to the station's opening, passengers were offered a preview of the station during the DTL open house on 5 December.

=== Cross Island Line ===
The station was first announced to interchange with the Cross Island Line (CRL) on 20 September 2022 by Transport Minister S. Iswaran. The CRL platforms will be constructed as part of CRL Phase 2, a 15 km (9.3 mi) segment spanning six stations from Turf City station to Jurong Lake District station.

The contract for the construction of CRL King Albert Park station was awarded to China Communications Construction Company Limited (Singapore Branch) for S$447 million (US$333.58 million) in October 2023. Construction of the new station was scheduled to begin in 2024 and be completed in 2032. When completed, the CRL station will be the deepest MRT station on the network at 50 metres (160 ft) underground.

== Details ==
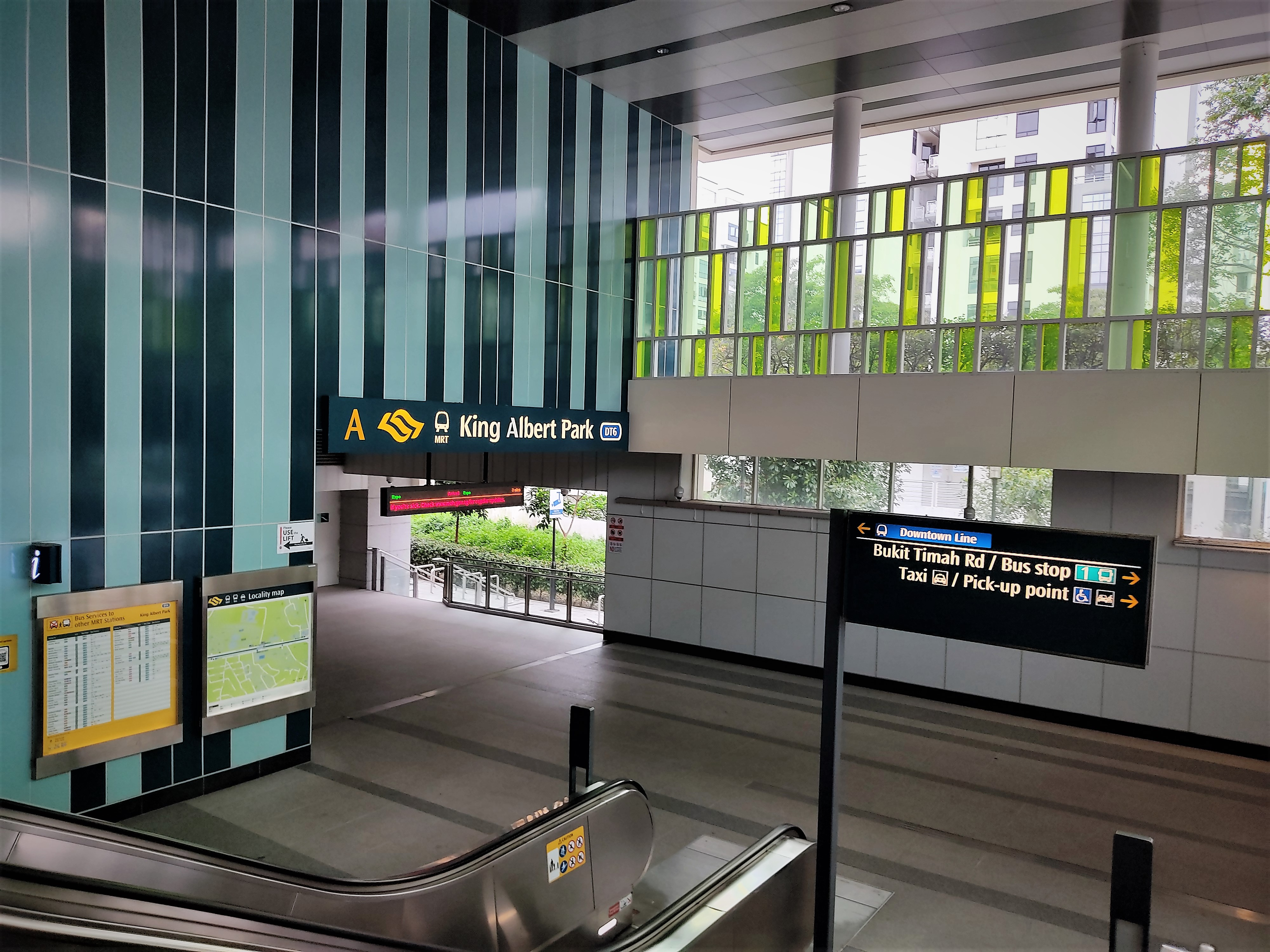
Exit A of the station

King Albert Park station serves the Downtown Line (DTL) and is situated between the Beauty World and Sixth Avenue stations. The official station code is DT6. Being part of the DTL, the station is operated by SBS Transit. The station is located along Bukit Timah Road at the junction with Blackmore Drive. Surrounding landmarks of the station include: Bukit Timah Railway Bridge, the preserved Bukit Timah Railway Station, Covenant Community Methodist Church, Methodist Girls' School, Ngee Ann Polytechnic, and Sime Darby Centre.

=== Design ===
The designs of King Albert Park station and the adjoining stations, Tan Kah Kee and Sixth Avenue, are intended to represent the natural elements. The blue and turquoise panels in the station, arranged in ripple patterns, is intended to reflect the water surfaces.

The station is wheelchair-accessible. A tactile system, consisting of tiles with rounded or elongated raised studs, guides visually impaired commuters through the station, with dedicated routes that connect the station entrances to the platforms or between the lines. Wider fare gates allow easier access for wheelchair users into the station.

King Albert Park station is a designated Civil Defence (CD) shelter. To be activated in times of national emergency, the station features the reinforced steel blast doors and decontamination chambers to protect against chemical attacks.

=== Art-in-Transit ===
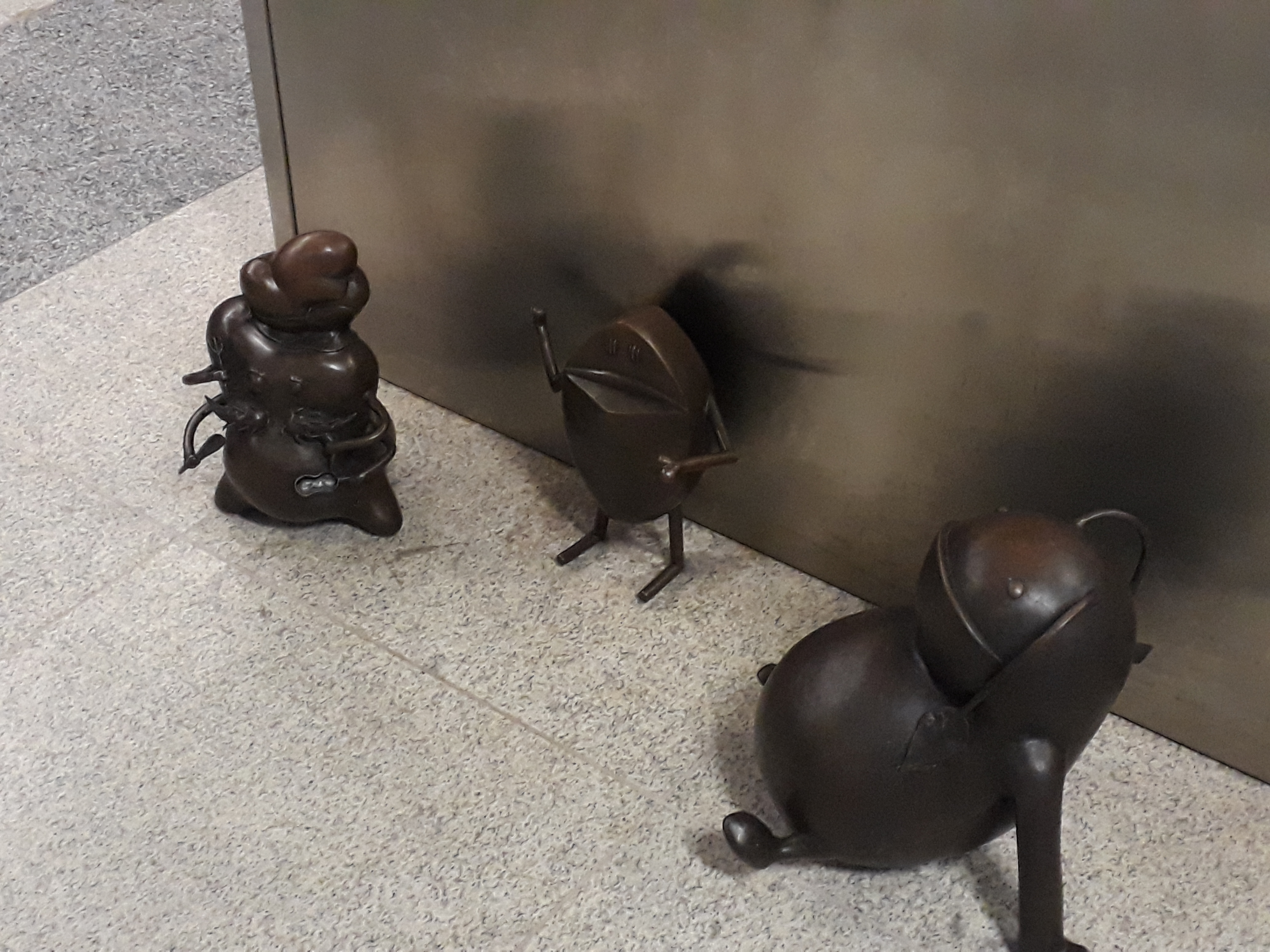
Artwork within the station

King Albert Park station features The Natural History of Singapore's Mythical Botanic Creatures by Chan Mei Hsien, Long Ying Han and Soh Pei Ling Joey of the Artists Caravan. The work was commissioned as part of the MRT network's Art-in-Transit (AiT) Programme, a public art showcase which integrates artworks into the MRT network. The artwork depicts bronze statues of fantasy creatures placed at corners of the station, along with a "Nature Notebook" by MGS students printed on glass panes along the station's pedestrian bridge. Referencing the wildlife that resides in the nearby Bukit Timah Nature Reserve, the artwork is intended as a "whimsical narrative", depicting contrasts between natural and manmade environmental features through the revelation of the "secret lives" of these mystical creatures.
