= Defu MRT station =

Future Mass Rapid Transit station in Singapore

Defu CR7 德福 டெஃபு
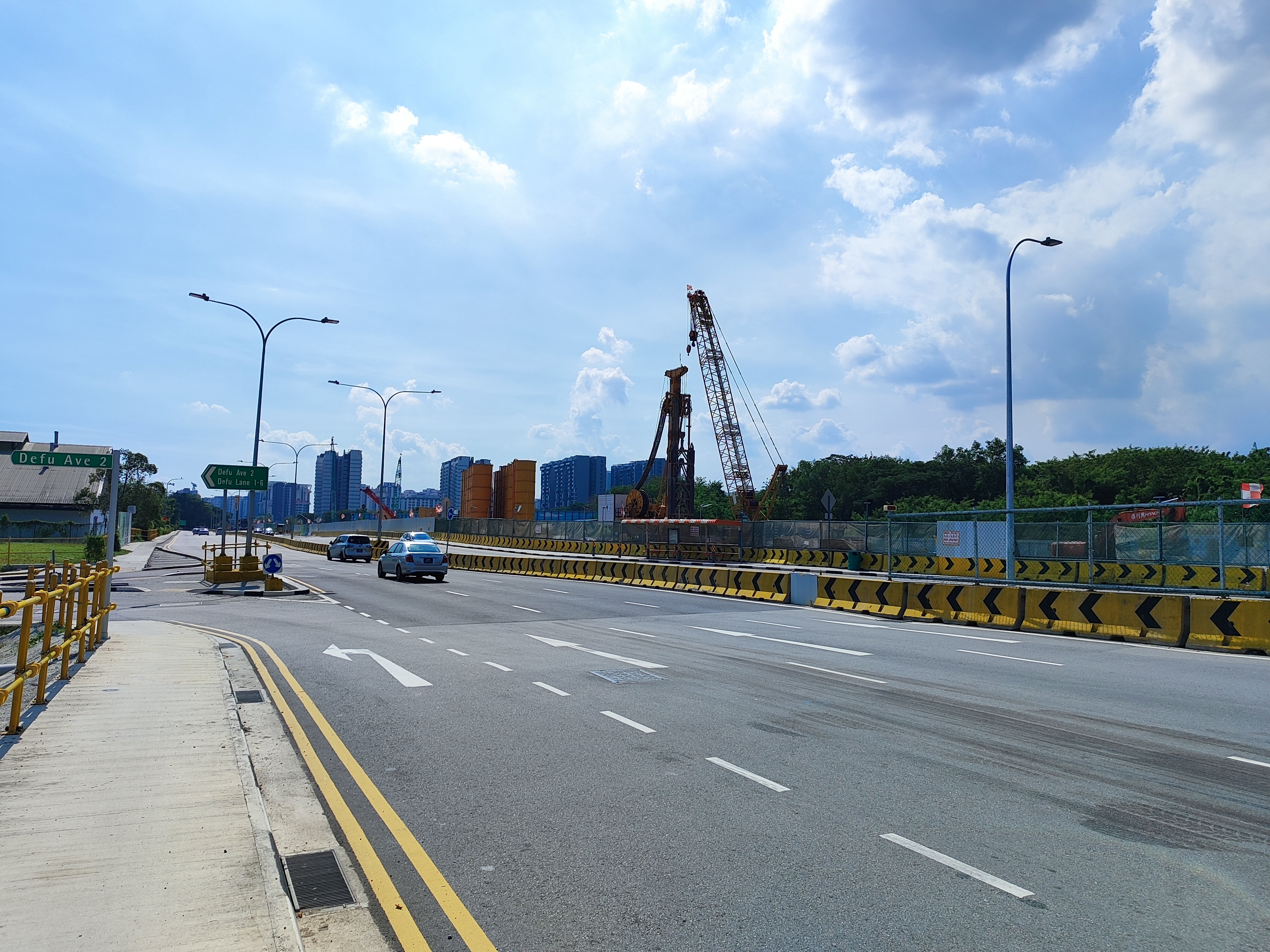
- Defu MRT station site in September 2024

General information
- Location: 1 Serangoon River Road, Singapore 536012
- Coordinates: 01°21′44″N 103°53′56″E
- System: Future Mass Rapid Transit (MRT) station
- Owner: Land Transport Authority
- Line: Cross Island Line
- Platforms: 2 (2 side platforms)
- Tracks: 2
- Connections: Bus, Taxi

Construction
- Structure type: Underground
- Accessible: Yes

Other information
- Station code: DFU

History
- Opening: 2030; 4 years' time

Services
Preceding station	Mass Rapid Transit	Following station
Tampines North towards Aviation Park	Cross Island Line Future service	Hougang towards Bright Hill
Location
- Location within Singapore Rail

Defu MRT station is a future underground Mass Rapid Transit (MRT) station on the Cross Island Line (CRL) in Hougang planning area, Singapore. It will be located at Tampines Road at the junction of Defu Avenue 2 and will serve the industries near Tampines Road and Defu Industrial Park.

== History ==
On 25 January 2019, the Land Transport Authority (LTA) announced that Defu station would be part of the proposed Cross Island Line (CRL). The station will be constructed as part of Phase 1 (CRL1), consisting of 12 stations between Aviation Park and Bright Hill. CRL1 was expected to be completed in 2029. However, the restrictions imposed on construction works due to the COVID-19 pandemic led to delays and the CRL1 completion date was pushed by one year to 2030.

The contract for the construction of bored tunnels between this station and Tampines North station was awarded to Nishimatsu Construction Co Ltd on 8 November 2021 at S$446 million (US$326.9 million). As part of the contract, a facility building will be constructed to fulfil the electrical and mechanical requirements for the line. A large-diameter tunnel boring machine will be used to construct a tunnel with double tracks. Tunnelling through abrasive alluvium soil, the boring machine has to be closely monitored for wear and tear. Construction for these tunnels is expected to start in December 2021.

The contract for the design and construction of Defu Station and associated tunnels was awarded to a joint venture between Gamuda Singapore Branch and Wai Fong Construction on 22 February 2022 for S$467 million (US$342.3 million). Construction of the station required excavation into mixed ground conditions of marine clay and sandy and silty clay.

A segment of Defu Avenue 2 was closed from 20 to 21 June 2023. Tampines Road, which ran through the station site, was realigned on 25 June 2023. Tampines Road was realigned on 27 April 2024 along with Serangoon River Road in the second stage of road diversions. Tunnelling works were completed in November 2025.

== Station details ==
The station is a three-level, underground station located along Tampines Road at the junction of Defu Avenue 2. Its station code is ‘CR7’. The station has four exits along Tampines Road.
