= Pasir Ris East MRT station =

Future Mass Rapid Transit station in Singapore

Pasir Ris East CR4 巴西立东 பாசிர் ரிஸ் ஈஸ்ட்
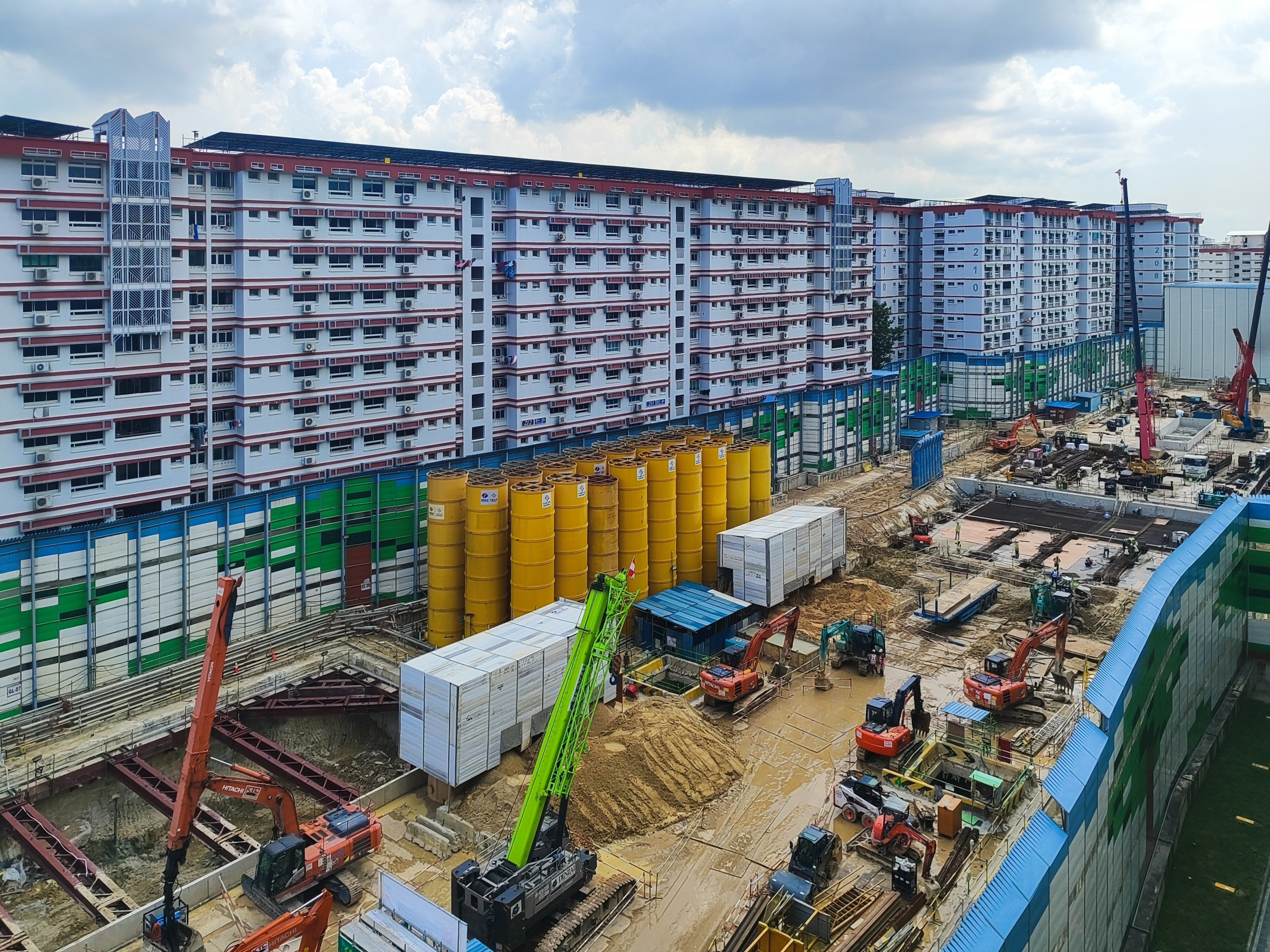
- Pasir Ris East MRT station site

General information
- Location: 20 Pasir Ris Drive 1, Singapore 519969
- Coordinates: 01°21′58″N 103°57′40″E
- System: Future Mass Rapid Transit (MRT) station
- Owner: Land Transport Authority
- Line: Cross Island Line
- Platforms: 2 (1 island platform)
- Tracks: 2
- Connections: Bus, Taxi

Construction
- Structure type: Underground
- Accessible: Yes

Other information
- Station code: PRE

History
- Opening: 2030; 4 years' time

Services
Preceding station	Mass Rapid Transit	Following station
Loyang towards Aviation Park	Cross Island Line Future service	Pasir Ris towards Bright Hill
Location
- Location within Singapore Rail

Pasir Ris East MRT station is a future underground Mass Rapid Transit station on the Cross Island Line located in Pasir Ris, Singapore. It will be located along Pasir Ris Drive 1, between Pasir Ris Street 12 and Pasir Ris Street 11.

== History ==
On 25 January 2019, the Land Transport Authority (LTA) announced that Pasir Ris East station would be part of the proposed Cross Island Line (CRL). The station will be constructed as part of Phase 1 (CRL1), consisting of 12 stations between Aviation Park and Bright Hill. CRL1 was expected to be completed in 2029. However, the restrictions imposed on construction works due to the COVID-19 pandemic led to delays and the CRL1 completion date was pushed by one year to 2030.

The contract for the design and construction of Pasir Ris East Station and associated tunnels was awarded on 7 February 2022 to a joint venture between Singapore Engineering & Construction Pte. Ltd. and Sinohydro Corporation Limited (Singapore Branch) at S$363 million (US$266.1 million). Construction of the station started in the second quarter of 2022. The works involve the installation of an earth retaining and stabilising structure and excavation works of up to 25 metres (82 ft) deep. The roads and utilities are to be diverted in stages to facilitate construction works.

On 30 October 2022, a section of Pasir Ris Drive 1 between Pasir Ris Drive 2 and Drive 4 was closed off to facilitate the construction of the station. Bus services plying the affected stretch of the road will be diverted to the adjoining roads of Pasir Ris Street 11 and Street 12.

On 16 January 2024, a grabber fell down at the construction site of the station, causing damage to a noise barrier. No one was injured from the incident. LTA said that a safety time-out was called following the incident, and that checks would be conducted to ensure the site was in order before works recommence.
