= Tampines station =

Tampines station may refer to:

- Tampines MRT station, a station on the Mass Rapid Transit (MRT) of Singapore

== See also ==
- Tampines East MRT station, another station on the DTL
- Tampines West MRT station, another station on the DTL
- Tampines North MRT station, a prospective station on the under-construction Cross Island Line (CRL)
- Tampines
