= Tampines North MRT station =

Future Mass Rapid Transit station in Singapore

Tampines North CR6 淡滨尼北 தெம்பினிஸ் நார்த்
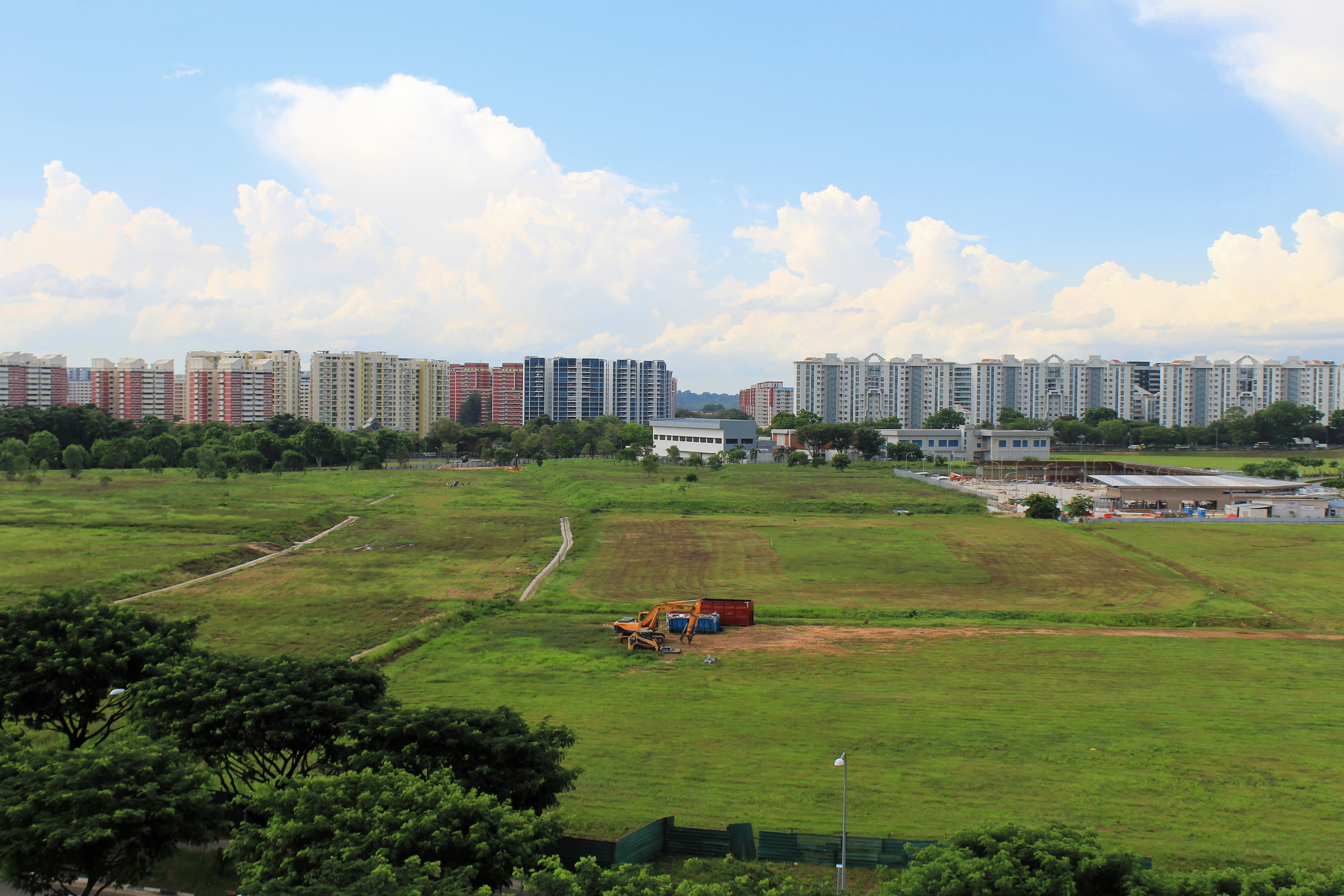
- Tampines North MRT station site in 2022, with Tampines North Bus Interchange on the right.

General information
- Coordinates: 01°22′09″N 103°56′16″E
- System: Future Mass Rapid Transit (MRT) station
- Owner: Land Transport Authority
- Line: Cross Island Line
- Platforms: 2 (1 island platform)
- Tracks: 4 (Including 2 sidings)
- Connections: Bus, Taxi

Construction
- Structure type: Underground
- Accessible: Yes

Other information
- Station code: TPN

History
- Opening: 2030; 4 years' time

Services
Preceding station	Mass Rapid Transit	Following station
Pasir Ris towards Aviation Park	Cross Island Line Future service	Defu towards Bright Hill
Location
- Location within Singapore Rail

Tampines North MRT station is a future underground Mass Rapid Transit station on the Cross Island Line located in Tampines, Singapore. Upon opening, this MRT station will be in close proximity with Tampines North Bus Interchange, IKEA Tampines, COURTS Megastore and Giant Tampines.

== History ==
On 25 January 2019, the Land Transport Authority (LTA) announced that Tampines North station would be part of the proposed Cross Island Line (CRL). The station will be constructed as part of Phase 1 (CRL1), consisting of 12 stations between Aviation Park and Bright Hill. CRL1 was expected to be completed in 2029. However, the restrictions imposed on construction works due to the COVID-19 pandemic led to delays and the CRL1 completion date was pushed by one year to 2030.

The contract for the construction of bored tunnels between this station and Defu station was awarded to Nishimatsu Construction Co Ltd on 8 November 2021 at S$446 million (US$332.8 million). As part of the contract, a facility building will be constructed to fulfil the electrical and mechanical requirements for the line. A large-diameter tunnel boring machine will be used to construct a tunnel with double tracks. Tunnelling through abrasive alluvium soil, the boring machine has to be closely monitored for wear and tear. Construction for these tunnels will start in December 2021. COWI was also chosen to design tunnels between the two stations.

The contract for the construction of Tampines North station was awarded to China Communications Construction Company for S$397 million (US$288 million) in February 2022. Construction was expected to begin in the second quarter of 2022, with an expected completion date of 2030. The station's construction required excavation into mixed ground conditions of marine clay and sandy and silty clay.

== Station details ==
The station is built as part of Phase 1 of the Cross Island line. Its station code is “CR6”. The station has two sidings, one for each platform, and four exits.
