= Loyang MRT station =

Future Mass Rapid Transit station in Singapore

Loyang CR3 罗央 லோயாங்
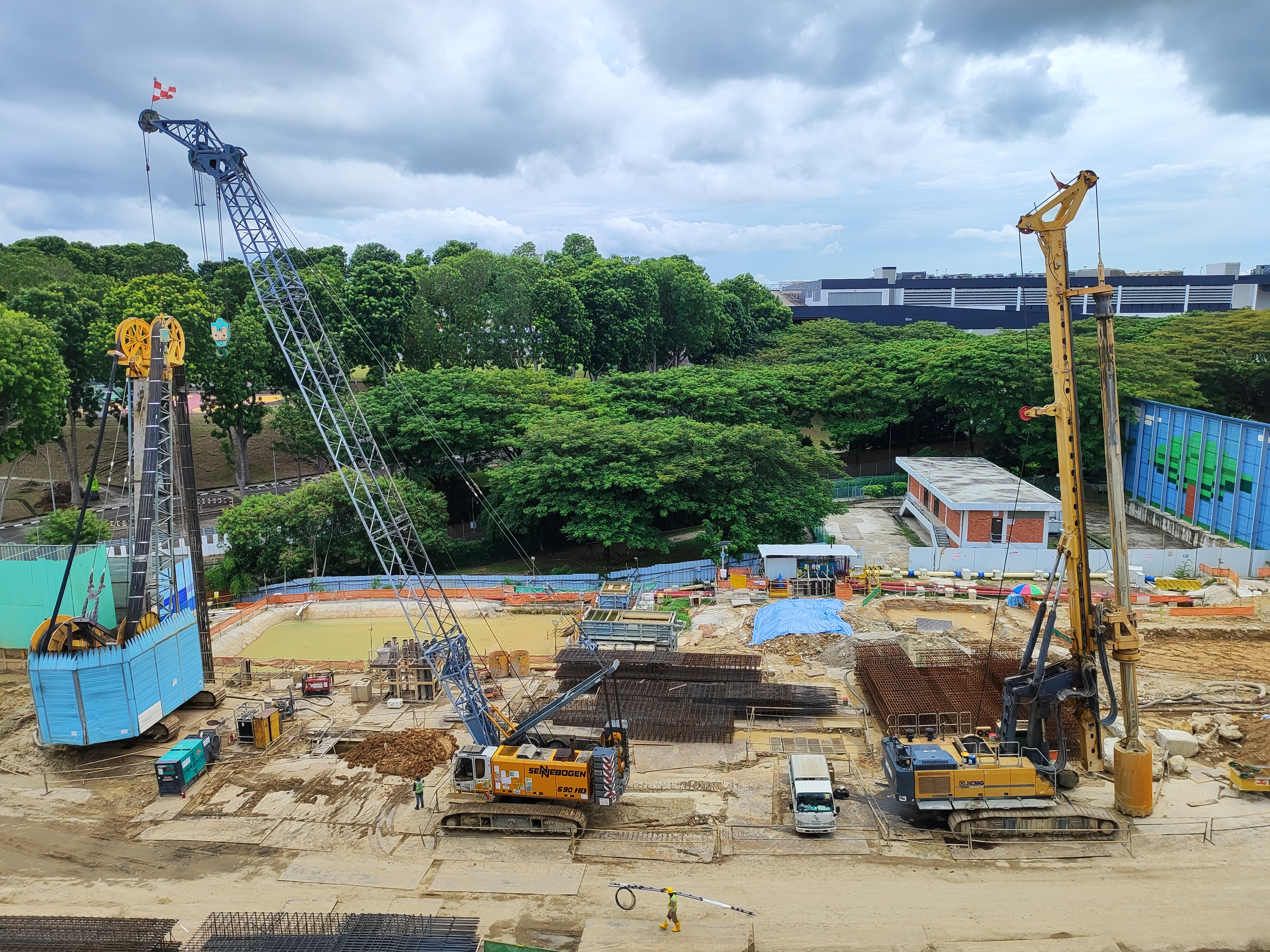
- Loyang MRT station site in November 2024

General information
- Coordinates: 01°22′19″N 103°58′19″E
- System: Future Mass Rapid Transit (MRT) station
- Owner: Land Transport Authority
- Line: Cross Island Line
- Platforms: 4 (2 island platforms)
- Tracks: 3
- Connections: Bus, Taxi

Construction
- Structure type: Underground
- Accessible: Yes

Other information
- Station code: LYG

History
- Opening: 2030; 4 years' time

Services
Preceding station	Mass Rapid Transit	Following station
Aviation Park Terminus	Cross Island Line Future service	Pasir Ris East towards Bright Hill
Location
- Location within Singapore Rail

Loyang MRT station is a future underground Mass Rapid Transit station on the Cross Island Line (CRL) located in Pasir Ris, Singapore. It will be located underneath Loyang Avenue, at the junction with Loyang Lane.

The station is in the vicinity of Loyang Industrial Estate, Loyang Valley Condominium, and Loyang Bus Depot.

== History ==
On 25 January 2019, the Land Transport Authority (LTA) announced that Loyang station would be part of the proposed Cross Island Line (CRL). The station will be constructed as part of Phase 1 (CRL1), consisting of 12 stations between Aviation Park and Bright Hill, and was expected to be completed in 2029. However, restrictions imposed on construction works due to the COVID-19 pandemic pushed the completion date for CRL1 to 2030.

On 8 March 2021, Contract CR105 for the design and construction of bored tunnels between the Aviation Park and Loyang stations was awarded to Taisei Corporation – China State Construction Engineering Corporation Limited Singapore Branch Joint Venture at a sum of S$356 million (US$261 million). Construction works for the 3.2-kilometre (2.0-mile) tunnel is expected to start in the second quarter of 2021 and is targeted to be completed by 2030 when CRL1 commences passenger service. For the first time, the LTA will use a large-diameter tunnel boring machine to construct a single tunnel with two tracks in it.

Subsequently, the contract for the station's construction and tunnelling works was awarded to Woh Hup Pte. Ltd. – Dongah Geological Engineering Co. JV on 13 September 2021. The S$748 million contract (US$548.3 million) includes constructing a section of a vehicular viaduct above the station. Due to the weak ground condition at the site (a combination of hard granite and alluvium soil), specially designed machinery will be used for excavation works. The new vehicular viaduct above the station is expected to improve traffic along Loyang Avenue.

The construction will involve multiple traffic diversions to relocate the utilities underneath the road. From the first quarter of 2023, the segment of Loyang Avenue between Pasir Ris Drive 3 and Loyang Way will be closed, with a new bus-only road for affected bus services plying the road.
