= CR4 =

CR4 may refer to:

== Science and technology ==
- Complement receptor 4, a complement receptor in the immune system
- CR4, a control register in the x86 CPU architecture
- 100GBASE-CR4 and 40GBASE-CR4, in 100 Gigabit Ethernet and 40 Gigabit Ethernet

== Other uses ==
- CR4, four-firm concentration ratio, a measure of market concentration in economics
- CR4, a postcode district in the CR postcode area in England
- Pasir Ris East MRT station (CR4), an upcoming MRT station on the Cross Island Line in Singapore
