= Turf City MRT station =

Future Mass Rapid Transit station in Singapore

Turf City CR14 马城 டர்ஃப் சிட்டி
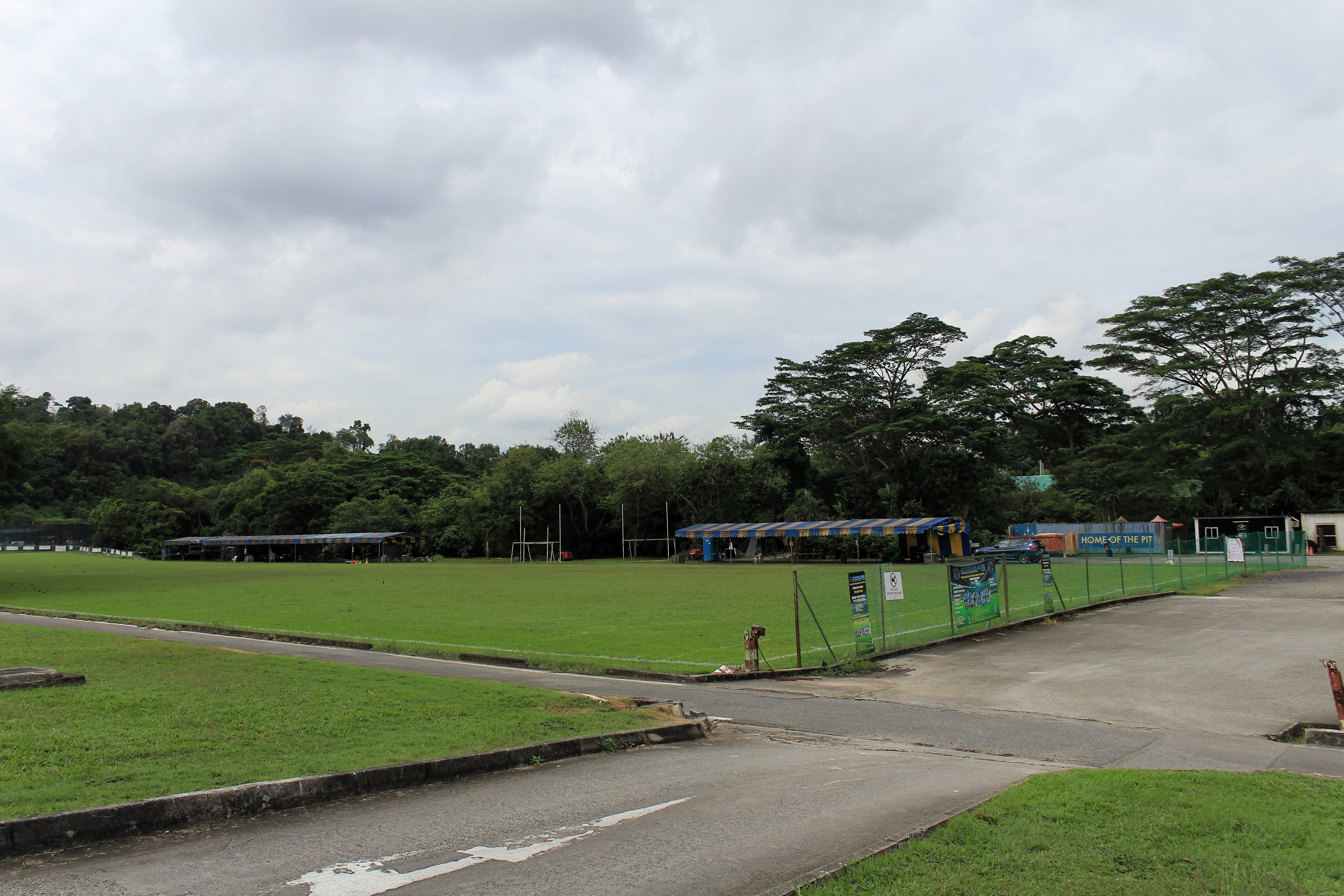
- Future site of Turf City station

General information
- Coordinates: 01°20′27″N 103°47′40″E
- System: Future Mass Rapid Transit (MRT) station
- Owner: Land Transport Authority
- Line: Cross Island Line
- Platforms: 2 (1 island platform)
- Tracks: 4 (Including 2 sidings)
- Connections: Bus, Taxi

Construction
- Structure type: Underground
- Platform levels: 3
- Accessible: Yes

Other information
- Station code: TFT

History
- Opening: 2032; 6 years' time

Services
Preceding station	Mass Rapid Transit	Following station
Bright Hill towards Aviation Park	Cross Island Line Future service	King Albert Park towards Jurong Lake District
Location
- Location within Singapore Rail

Turf City MRT station is a future underground Mass Rapid Transit station on the Cross Island Line (CRL) located in Bukit Timah, Singapore. First announced in September 2022, the station is expected to be completed in 2032 along with the other CRL Phase 2 stations.

== History ==
Turf City station was first announced on 20 September 2022 by then-Transport Minister S. Iswaran. The station will be constructed as part of Phase 2 of the Cross Island Line (CRL), a 15-kilometre (9.3 mi) segment spanning six stations from this station to Jurong Lake District MRT station. The station is expected to be completed in 2032.

Built to serve a new residential development at Turf City, the tenants of the sports complex had to move out before the end of 2023.

Through environmental impact studies, the station site was shifted slightly south from its original planned alignment. This was to limit the construction area needed to build the station, reducing the impact on the wildlife in the surrounding forested area.

The contract for the design and construction of Turf City station and tunnels was awarded to a joint venture between Shanghai Tunnel Engineering Co (Singapore) and Obayashi Corporation for S$530 million (US$395.5 million) in May 2024. Construction was scheduled to begin in the 3rd quarter of 2024 with a targeted completion date of 2032.

On 14 May 2026, a banksman died after being struck by a concrete slab at the Turf City work site. The worker was hacking a temporary concrete section.

== Details ==
The station will serve the Cross Island Line (CRL) and have an official station code of CR14. It will be located at the former The Grandstand. Parts of The Grandstand will therefore be reinstated taking experience from Lau Pa Sat and redevelop into the Olympic facility. The area has been slated for a new housing development.
