= CRRC Qingdao Sifang CR151 =

Class of electric train in Singapore

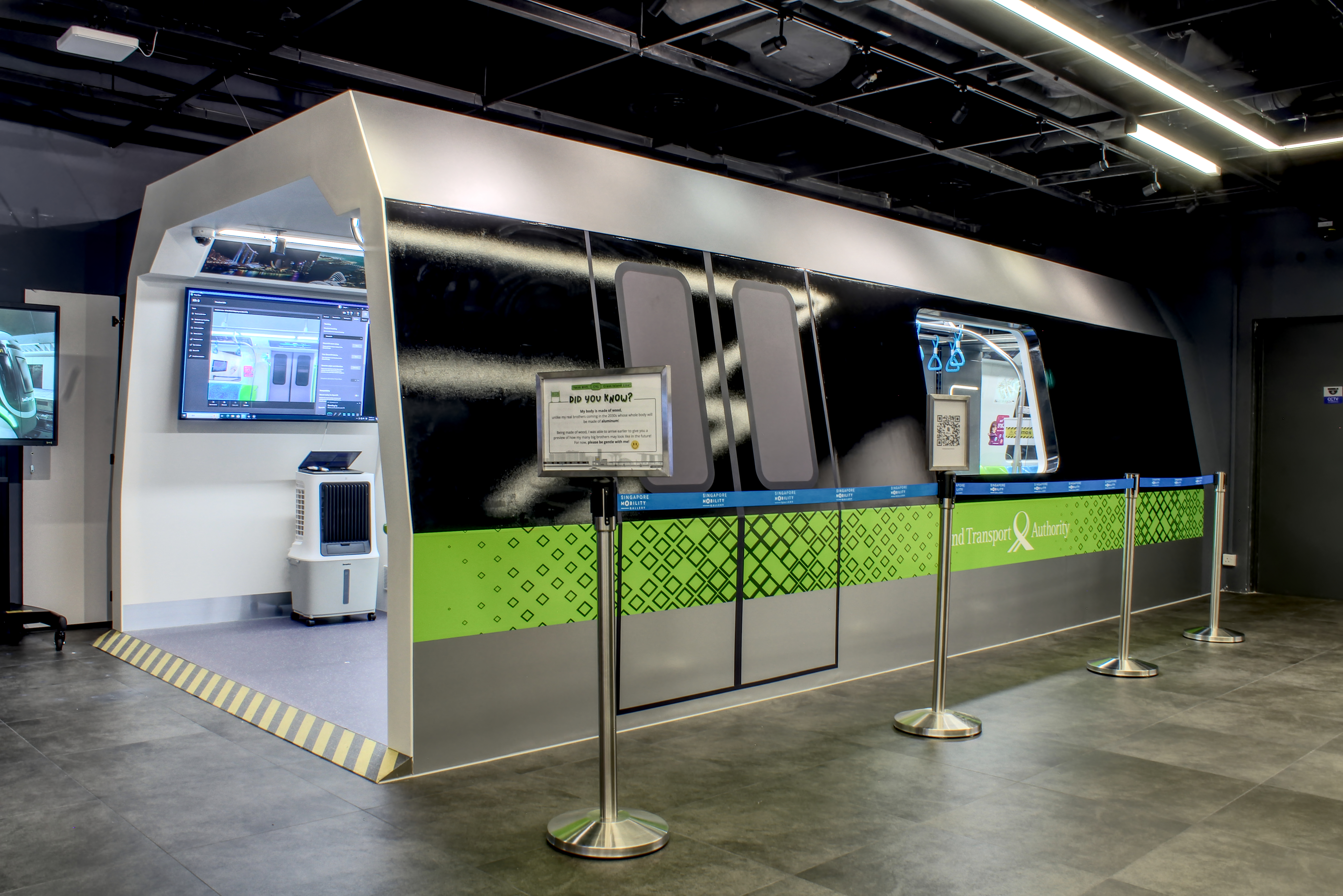
- Exterior mockup of the CR151

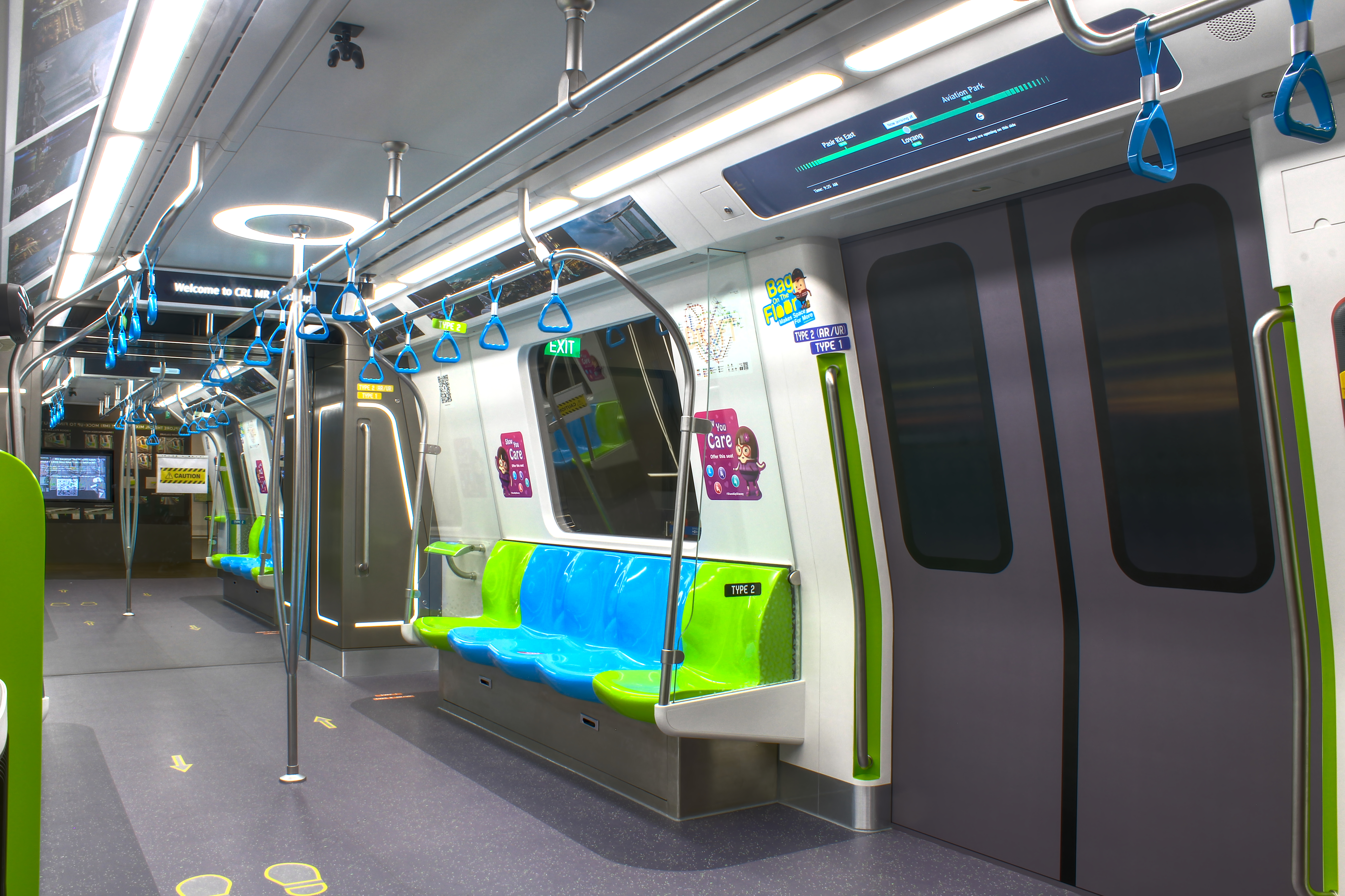
- Interior mockup of the CR151.
- Stock type: Electric multiple unit
- In service: 2030; 4 years' time (Projected)
- Manufacturer: CRRC Qingdao Sifang
- Built at: Qingdao, Shandong, China
- Constructed: 2025 – 2030
- Entered service: 2030; 4 years' time (Projected)
- Number under construction: 264 Vehicles (44 Sets)
- Number built: 264 Vehicles (44 Sets)
- Formation: 6/8 cars per trainset DT–Mp–Mi+Mi–Mp–DT
- Fleet numbers: 5001 – 5044
- Capacity: 1920 passengers per 6-car train
- Depot: Changi East
- Line served: Cross Island Line

Specifications
- Car body construction: Welded aluminium
- Train length: 138.5 m (454 ft 4 3/4 in)
- Car length: 23.65 m (77 ft 7 1/8 in) (DT); 22.8 m (74 ft 9 5/8 in) (Mp/Mi)
- Width: 3.2 m (10 ft 6 in)
- Height: 3.7 m (12 ft 1 5/8 in)
- Doors: 1,450 mm (57 1/8 in), 10 per car, 5 per side
- Maximum speed: 100 km/h (62 mph) (design); 90 km/h (56 mph) (service)
- Electric systems: 1,500 V DC Overhead conductor rail
- Current collection: Pantograph
- UIC classification: 2′2′+Bo′Bo′+Bo′Bo′+Bo′Bo′+Bo′Bo′+2′2′
- Safety system: Siemens Trainguard Sirius moving block CBTC ATC under ATO GoA 4 (UTO)
- Track gauge: 1,435 mm (4 ft 8 1/2 in) standard gauge

The CRRC Qingdao Sifang CR151 is a type of electric multiple unit built for the Cross Island Line of Singapore's Mass Rapid Transit (MRT) system. The contract was awarded to CRRC Sifang, a consortium of CRRC Qingdao Sifang Company and Singapore CRRC Sifang Railway Vehicles Service. As of June 2023, the Land Transport Authority (LTA) has purchased 44 six-car trains. The first train was delivered in May 2026, with the rest to be progressively delivered before the opening of the line in 2030.

== Tender ==
The tender for trains under the contract CR151 was closed on 23 September 2022 with four bids. The LTA has shortlisted all of them and the results has been released. The contract includes the option of purchasing up to 11 more trains. The tender results were published on 14 June 2023 on the Singapore government's GeBIZ platform:

S/N	Name of tenderer	Amount ($) (Option 3)
1	Alstom Transport (S) Pte Ltd	919,461,500.00 (SGD)
2	Construcciones Y Auxiliar De Ferrocarriles, S.A.	1,032,961,078.00 (SGD) + 655,898,277.00 (EUR)
3	CRRC Qingdao Sifang Co., Ltd.	588,959,039.00 (SGD)
4	Hyundai Rotem Company	743,186,400.0000 (SGD)

== Features ==
Each train car will have 10 doors per car (5 on each side), condition monitoring and diagnostic systems for early detection of potential equipment faults. Unlike most of the MRT lines in Singapore, these trains will draw power from a 1,500 V DC overhead conductor rail (OCR). Some trains will also be equipped with an Automated Track Inspection system to monitor the condition of the running rail and the OCR in real time. Between train cars, the gangway width is at 1.6 metres (5 ft 3 in), up from 1.4 metres (4 ft 7 in) on other lines, to improve commuter accessibility.

== Train formation ==
The coupling configuration of a CR151 in revenue service is DT–Mp–Mi+Mi–Mp–DT.

The train cars are assigned a 5-digit serial number ranging from 5001x to 5044x, where x depends on the carriage type. A complete six-car trainset consists of two driving trailers (DT) and four motor cars (Mi & Mp) permanently coupled together. For example, set 5001 consists of cars 50011, 50012, 50013, 50014, 50015, 50016.

- The first digit is always a 5.
- The second digit is always a 0.
- The third and fourth digits identify the set number.
- The fifth digit identifies the car number, where the first car has a 1, the second has a 2, the third has a 3, the fourth has a 4, the fifth has a 5 and the sixth has a 6.
- CRRC Qingdao Sifang built sets 5001 – 5044.

The trains are able to be coupled into a 8-car train set if needed to increase train capacity.
