= Cross Island Line =

Mass Rapid Transit line under construction in Singapore

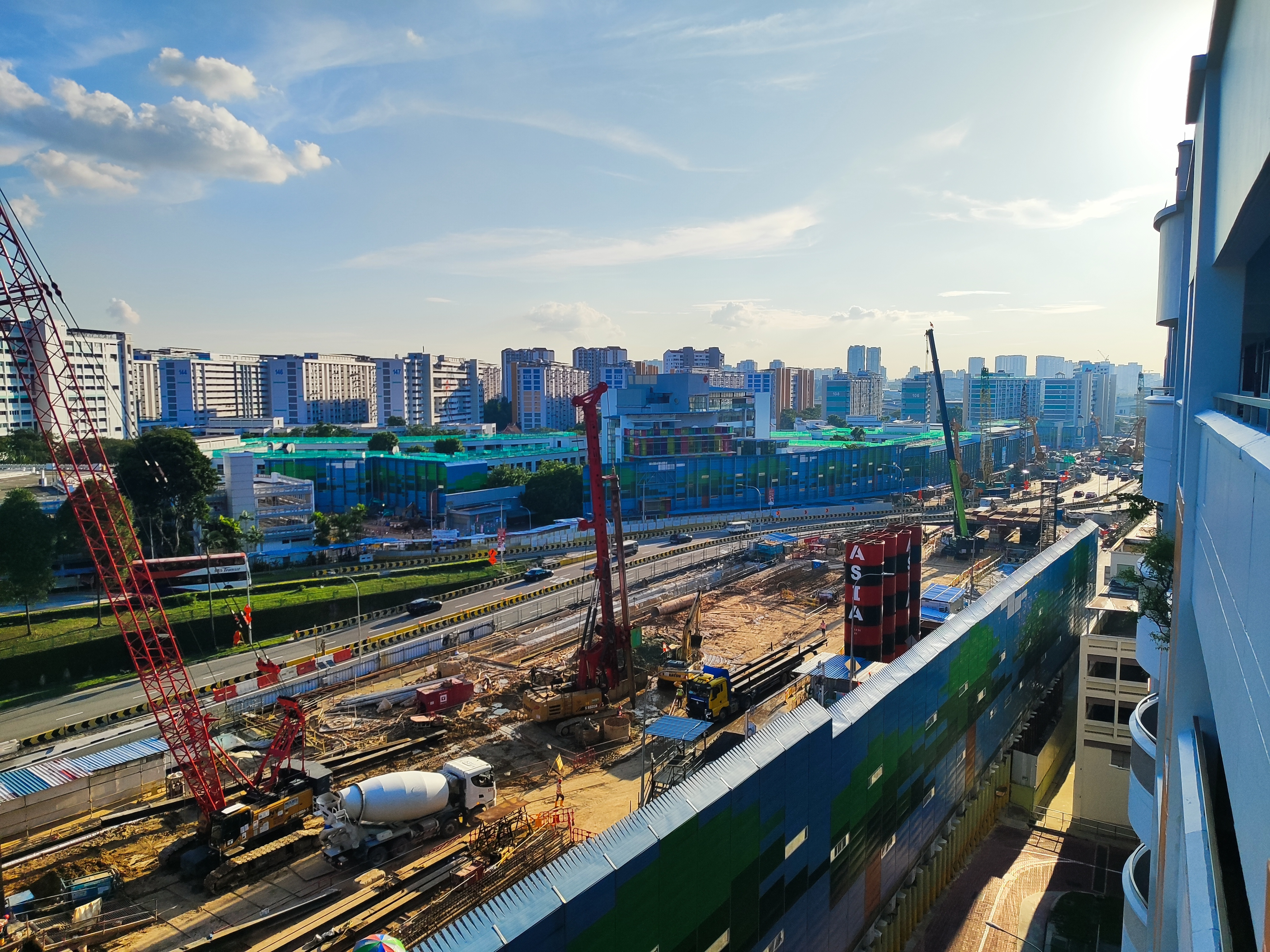
- Construction works at Serangoon North station

Overview
- Native name: Malay: Laluan MRT Rentas Pulau; Chinese: 跨岛地铁线; Tamil: குறுக்குத் தீவு ரயில் பாதை
- Status: Under construction (Phase 1, 2 & Punggol Extension); Under planning (Phase 3 & Changi Terminal 5)
- Owner: Land Transport Authority
- Locale: Singapore
- Termini: Aviation Park; Changi Terminal 5; Pasir Ris; Bright Hill; Gul Circle; Punggol
- Stations: 12 (Phase 1); 6 (Phase 2); 4 (Phase 3); 1 (Changi Terminal 5); 3 (Punggol Extension)
- Color on map: Lime (#97C616)

Service
- Type: Rapid transit
- System: Mass Rapid Transit (Singapore)
- Services: 3
- Operator: TBA
- Depot: Changi East
- Rolling stock: CRRC Qingdao Sifang CR151

History
- Planned opening: 2030 (Phase 1); 2032 (Phase 2 & Punggol Extension); mid-2030s (Changi Terminal 5); late-2030s (Phase 3)

Technical
- Line length: 29 km (18 mi) (Phase 1); 15 km (9.3 mi) (Phase 2); 10 km (6.2 mi) (Phase 3); 7.3 km (4.5 mi) (Punggol Extension); 5.8 km (3.6 mi) (Changi Terminal 5); 67 km (42 mi) (Total)
- Character: Fully underground
- Track gauge: 1,435 mm (4 ft 8 1/2 in) standard gauge
- Electrification: Overhead line, 1,500 V DC
Maps
Interactive Map

The Cross Island Line (CRL) is a high-capacity Mass Rapid Transit (MRT) line currently under construction in Singapore. It will run in an east–west direction across the planning areas of Changi to Pioneer, passing through Pasir Ris, Hougang, Serangoon, Ang Mo Kio, Bukit Timah, Clementi, Jurong East and Boon Lay. From Pasir Ris, a branch of the line will extend to Punggol. Once fully operational, the 67-kilometre (42 mi) line will replace the East–West Line (EWL) as the longest line on the MRT network, serving approximately 26 stations. It will utilise the CRRC Qingdao Sifang CR151 electric multiple unit (EMU), running in a six-car formation. However, to cater to future demand, stations on the line will be built to accommodate eight-car trains.

Plans for the CRL were first announced in 2013. It is envisioned to serve various key hubs including the Jurong Lake District and the Punggol Digital District, offering an alternative east–west connection to alleviate passenger load on the EWL. Shortly after the announcement, some nature groups called for the diversion of CRL tunnels away from the Central Catchment Nature Reserve (CCNR). Despite the calls, the government decided to continue with the original direct route in 2019, citing commuting time, economic factors and long-term energy consumption. The alignment and stations of Phase 1 were finalised in 2019, followed by the Punggol branch in 2020, Phase 2 in 2022, and Phase 3 in 2026. The proposed full line is expected to have a daily ridership of over one million in the long term, and to cost an estimated S$40.7 billion.

== History ==
=== Announcement ===
The Cross Island Line was first announced by then Transport Minister Lui Tuck Yew on 17 January 2013. The line was planned to relieve congestion on the existing East–West Line and slated to begin at Changi on Singapore's eastern coast, passing through the major eastern towns including Pasir Ris, Hougang and Ang Mo Kio. From this point, it would proceed further west toward Bukit Timah, Clementi and West Coast, before terminating in the Jurong Industrial Estate. A branch line was to connect the mainline to Punggol. The line was planned to be 50 km long and open in 2030. Studies on the Cross Island Line began in May 2013.

=== Line alignment ===
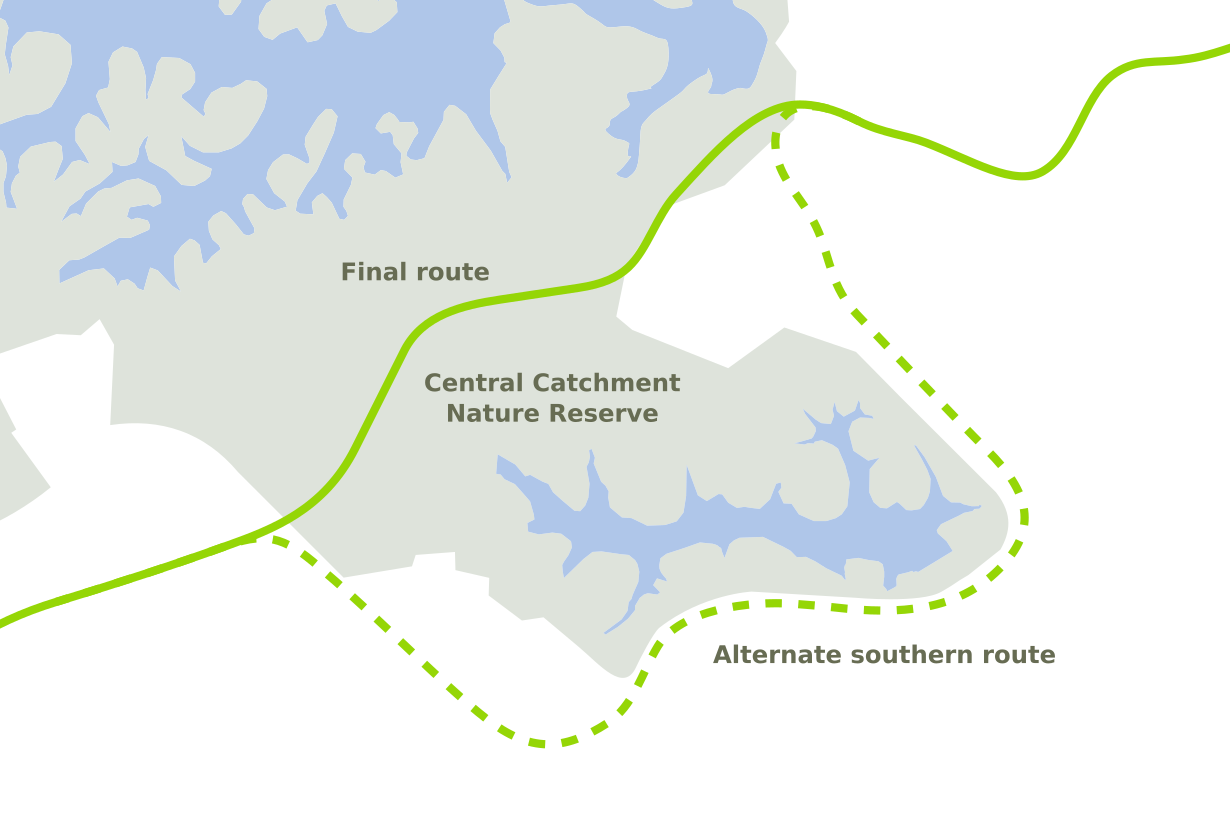
Final and alternate routes crossing the Central Catchment

Since its announcement, there has been controversy over the alignment of the line's Bukit Timah stretch crossing the Central Catchment Nature Reserve (CCNR) and MacRitchie Reservoir, which prompted the Nature Society Singapore to call for the line's realignment. Environmental groups urged the Government not to build the MRT line under the CCNR.

On 19 July 2013, the NSS put forward two proposed alternative alignments: a northern route that would run close to the Thomson–East Coast Line, heading west towards Mandai, Sungei Kadut and Gali Batu before terminating at Choa Chu Kang, and a southern route skirting the reserve along Lornie Road. One engineering professor Lee Der-Horng noted the possible feasibility of constructing the line through the reserve without impacting the environment, though he said the decision "shouldn't be just based on transport".

A tender to assess the environmental impact of the line was called for on 24 February 2014 to facilitate civil works for the line. In July 2014 the LTA appointed Environmental Resources Management (S) Pte Ltd (ERM) to conduct the Environmental Impact Assessment (EIA) for the section of the line around and through the nature reserve. The EIA was to be conducted in two phases with the first studying the ecosystem and physical conditions along both the straight and skirting alignments as well as assessing how construction and operation of the line would affect the CCNR. The Phase 1 EIA report was released in February 2016.

Soil investigation works along the CCNR began in February 2017 and by October, was announced to be nearing completion by the end of the year. On 20 March 2018, the LTA declared that the findings on the environmental impact of drilling and other initial works would be completed later that year. The Phase 2 EIA report was released in September 2019. On 4 December 2019, the Ministry of Transport confirmed that the direct route underneath the CCNR had been chosen, with mitigating factors such as tunnelling deeper than usual under the CCNR as well as no surface works in the area. The construction cost is also expected to be $2 billion lower than the alternative alignments.

In December 2022, the LTA awarded the contract for the design and construction of bored tunnels between Fairways Drive and Sin Ming Walk to a joint venture between Obayashi Corporation and Shanghai Tunnel Engineering Co (Singapore) Pte Ltd for $758 million.

=== Phase 1 ===
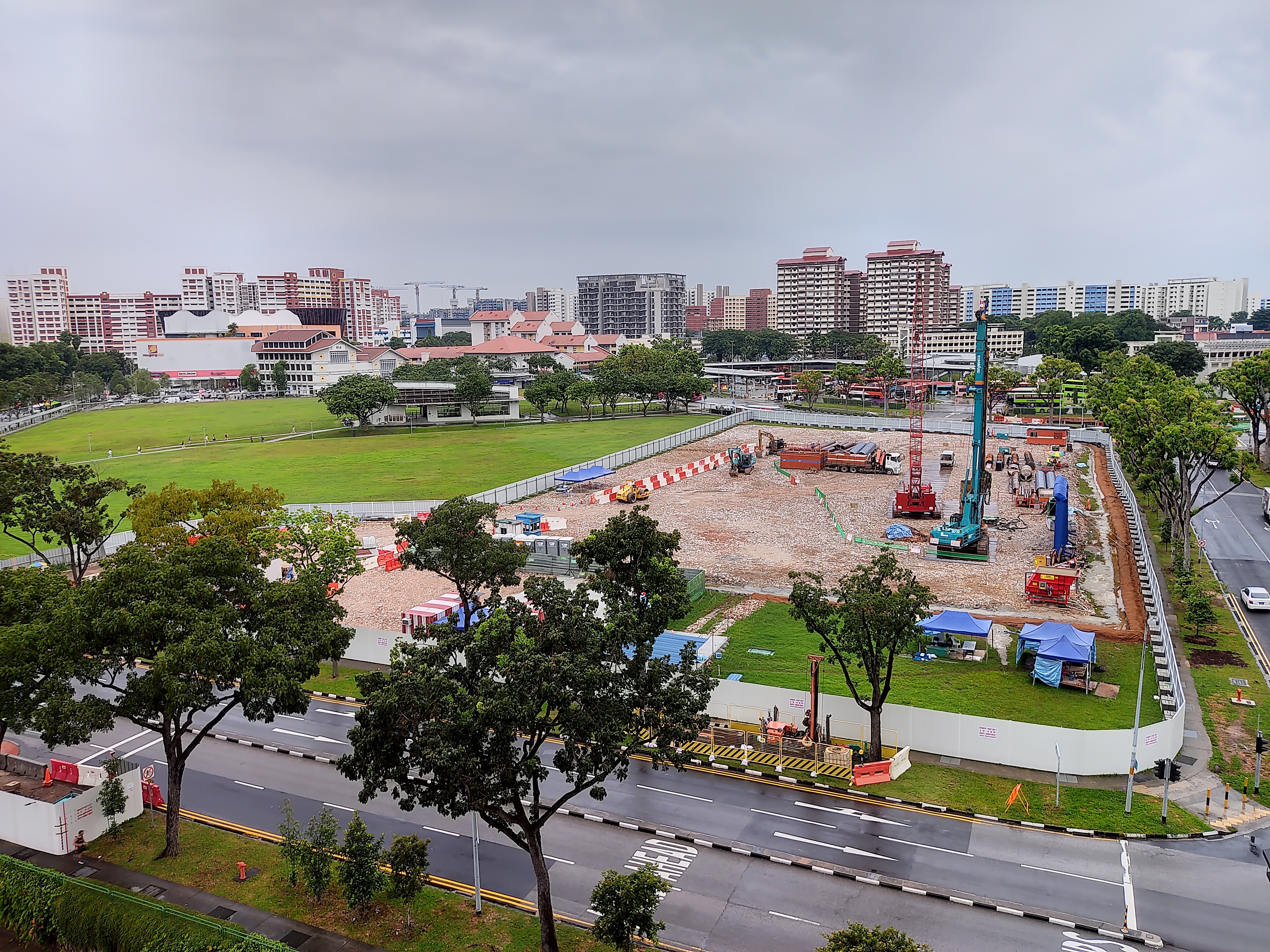
Construction works at Hougang CRL site

On 25 January 2019, then Transport Minister Khaw Boon Wan announced the alignment of CRL Phase 1 (CRL1). This segment of the line, spanning 29 kilometres (18 miles), consists of 12 stations from Aviation Park station to Bright Hill station. A new 57-hectare Changi East Depot was to be built to serve the line. Construction of CRL1 officially began on 18 January 2023. Originally expected to be completed in 2029, the opening date was pushed back a year as a result of restrictions imposed on construction works due to the COVID-19 pandemic.

==== Punggol Extension ====
The Punggol Extension was initially conceived as part of the North Shore Line, which was first announced by National Development Minister Lim Hng Kiang in December 1996. The LRT line would connect between Pasir Ris and Woodlands or Sembawang. A station box for the future line was constructed beneath the Punggol NEL station. During a national conference organised by the Feedback Unit in April 2005, the transport ministry confirmed that plans for the MRT line were still under study, in response to suggestions for a line between Pasir Ris and Punggol. Nevertheless, the line would only be built in tandem with development plans along the line.

On 10 March 2020, the LTA announced details of the 7.3-kilometre (4.5-mile) CRL - Punggol Extension (CPE). The branch will consist of four stations from Pasir Ris station to Punggol station. Similarly to CRL1, the opening of CPE was delayed from its original 2031 opening date to 2032. As of January 2022, there were no plans to extend the Punggol branch to Jalan Kayu. Member of Parliament Gan Thiam Poh also proposed to serve residents of Fernvale and Yio Chu Kang by extending the CRL Punggol branch to Yio Chu Kang station; transport minister Chee Hong Tat said "no plans" exist yet for such an extension.

==== Extension to Changi Airport Terminal 5 ====
The LTA was also studying a possible extension to Changi Airport Terminal 5. This was later confirmed by LTA in January 2019, during the announcement of Phase 1 of the CRL, with the station code "CR1" possibly reserved for a station in Terminal 5. Later that year on 25 May, LTA published the Land Transport Masterplan 2040, which confirmed the extension of both the CRL and Thomson-East Coast Line (TEL) to the Terminal 5, with plans for the TEL to further extend to the existing Changi Airport MRT station on the East–West Line and absorb the Changi Airport branch of that line, which includes Expo and Tanah Merah stations.

On 14 May 2025, during the groundbreaking of Terminal 5, the airport operator Changi Airport Group gave further confirmation of plans to extend the TEL and CRL to the terminal, and the first render of the station design was unveiled. Later on 25 July, the LTA officially announced Changi Terminal 5 station as an interchange station with the TEL, unveiling the location of Changi Terminal 5 station and the alignments of the extension of both lines. The Changi Terminal 5 station will be located in the terminal's ground transportation centre, which will border the Changi East Urban District.

=== Phase 2 ===
In December 2021, as part of a virtual exhibition by the LTA, a future system map depicted a series of 11 unnamed stations on the western half of the CRL. The map also showed the western segment interchanging with existing and under-construction stations: King Albert Park, Clementi, Jurong Pier and Gul Circle stations. The map, along with the virtual exhibition, has since been offline. The LTA explained that the route was a "conceptual alignment" yet to be finalised, with the interchange stations being tentative.

On 20 September 2022, then Transport Minister S. Iswaran confirmed the stations for Phase 2 of the CRL. Expected to open in 2032, the 15-kilometre (9.3 mi) segment spans six stations from Turf City station to Jurong Lake District station. Construction of these stations was expected to start in 2023. On 7 July 2025, a groundbreaking ceremony was held at Clementi station, marking the official beginning of the construction of Phase 2.

=== Phase 3 ===
In 2021, LTA published a map of the MRT system in the 2030s as part of a virtual exhibition before replacing the map omitting details of phase 2 and 3. In February 2022, it was projected that the second and third phases will be about 14 kilometres (8.7 miles) and 13 kilometres (8.1 miles) long respectively. The Straits Times projected that civil works for Phase 3 might be completed by the end of 2033, with operations beginning in 2034 or later. However, LTA stated that the exact timeline is unclear and will only be known with the completion of advanced engineering studies, which was still ongoing by July 2025.

Studies for phase 3 concluded in March 2026. On 31 July 2026, the stations of Phase 3 was announced. The 10 kilometres (6.2 miles) long extension consists of four stations, with an interchange at Jurong Pier station and Gul Circle station on the Jurong Region Line and East–West Line, respectively. A second depot for the CRL will also be built past Gul Circle station at the site of the former Raffles Country Club. Construction of Phase 3 is slated to begin in 2027, with completion set in the late 2030s. Industrial properties were gazetted for acquisition, either in part or in full, to facilitate construction. The exact track alignment of Phase 3 is yet to be announced as of July 2026.

=== Future plans ===
In 2022, in conceptual plans for the redevelopment of Paya Lebar Air Base, an additional station was proposed between Defu and Tampines North stations to serve potential developments within the redeveloped area.

== Network and operations ==
=== Route ===
Planned route of the Cross Island Line

The 58 kilometres (36 mi)-long CRL is planned to run in a generally east–west direction, serving 27 stations and being an alternative route to the existing East–West Line (EWL) and Downtown Line (DTL). Phase 1 of the line goes west from Changi, in the east, to Pasir Ris. The line branches off to Punggol Digital District and goes south-west towards Tampines North, and west to Hougang, and further towards Sin Ming via Ang Mo Kio. Phase 2 of the line connects Bukit Timah to Sin Ming, tunneling through the CCNR, before continuing south-west to West Coast via Clementi, before heading north-west to Jurong Lake District. Phase 3 concludes the line at the Jurong Industrial Estate.

=== Services ===
The possibility of implementing an express service for the CRL was also studied. However, then Transport Minister Khaw announced in 2018 that express services were considered not feasible, citing the higher cost needed to build extra tracks, tunnels and additional signalling systems that can affect non-express commuters and existing lines.

=== Stations ===
Names stated are working names, except for the existing interchange stations.

Cross Island Line stations timeline
Date	Project	Description
2030	Phase 1 (CRL1)	Aviation Park – Bright Hill
2032	Punggol Extension (CPE)	Pasir Ris – Punggol
2032	Phase 2 (CRL2)	Turf City – Jurong Lake District
Mid-2030s	Extension to Changi Airport Terminal 5	Aviation Park – Changi Terminal 5
Late-2030s	Phase 3 (CRL3)	CR20 – Gul Circle

Legend

Elevated	Line terminus	Transfer outside paid area
Ground-level	Wheelchair accessible	Bus interchange
Underground	Civil Defence Shelter	Other transportation modes

List

Station code	Station name	Image	Interchange; Adjacent transportation	Opening	Cost
Changi Terminal 5 extension (under planning, to be ready by mid-2030s)
CR1 TE32	Changi Terminal 5		Thomson–East Coast Line; Changi Airport Terminal 5	Mid-2030s; 9 years' time	TBA
Phase 1 (under construction, to be ready by 2030)
CR2	Aviation Park		Changi Ferry Terminal	2030; 4 years' time	S$320 million
CR2	Aviation Park		Changi Ferry Terminal	2030; 4 years' time	S$356 million (Note: Tunnel between Aviation Park and Loyang)
CR3	Loyang		—	2030; 4 years' time	S$356 million
CR3	Loyang		—	2030; 4 years' time	S$748 million
CR4	Pasir Ris East		—	2030; 4 years' time	S$363 million
CR5 CP1 EW1	Pasir Ris		Cross Island Line (Punggol Extension) (2032); East–West Line ― Pasir Ris	2030; 4 years' time	S$980 million
CR6	Tampines North		Tampines North	2030; 4 years' time	S$397 million
CR6	Tampines North		Tampines North	2030; 4 years' time	S$446 million (Note: Tunnel between Tampines North and Defu)
CR7	Defu		—	2030; 4 years' time	S$446 million
CR7	Defu		—	2030; 4 years' time	S$467 million
CR8 NE14	Hougang		North East Line ― Hougang Central	2030; 4 years' time	S$604 million
CR9	Serangoon North		—	2030; 4 years' time	S$454 million
CR10	Tavistock		—	2030; 4 years' time	S$407 million
CR11 NS16	Ang Mo Kio		North–South Line ― Ang Mo Kio	2030; 4 years' time	S$644 million
CR12	Teck Ghee		—	2030; 4 years' time	S$615.9 million
CR13 TE7	Bright Hill		Thomson–East Coast Line	2030; 4 years' time	S$526 million
CR13 TE7	Bright Hill		Thomson–East Coast Line	2030; 4 years' time	S$758 million (Note: Tunnel between Bright Hill and Turf City)
Phase 2 (under construction, to be ready by 2032)
CR14	Turf City		—	2032; 6 years' time	S$530 million
CR15 DT6	King Albert Park		Downtown Line	2032; 6 years' time	S$447 million
CR16	Maju		—	2032; 6 years' time	S$480 million
CR16	Maju		—	2032; 6 years' time	S$199 million (Note: Tunnel between Maju and Clementi)
CR17 EW23	Clementi		East–West Line ― Clementi	2032; 6 years' time	S$514 million
CR18 JE	West Coast		Jurong Region Line (East) (late-2030s)	2032; 6 years' time	S$510 million
CR18 JE	West Coast		Jurong Region Line (East) (late-2030s)	2032; 6 years' time	S$242 million (Note: Tunnel between West Coast and Jurong Lake District)
CR19	Jurong Lake District		—	2032; 6 years' time	S$590 million
Phase 3 (under planning, to be ready by late-2030s)
CR20	CR20		—	Late-2030s; 13 years' time	TBA
CR21 JS12	Jurong Pier		Jurong Region Line	Late-2030s; 13 years' time	TBA
CR22	CR22		—	Late-2030s; 13 years' time	TBA
CR23 EW30	Gul Circle		East–West Line	Late-2030s; 13 years' time	TBA
Punggol Extension (under construction, to be ready by 2032)
CP1 CR5 EW1	Pasir Ris		Cross Island Line; East–West Line ― Pasir Ris	2032; 6 years' time	S$980 million
CP2	Elias		—	2032; 6 years' time	$562 million
CP3 – PE4	Riviera		Punggol LRT (East Loop)	2032; 6 years' time	S$1.1 billion
CP4 NE17 PTC	Punggol		North East Line; Punggol LRT ― Punggol	2032; 6 years' time	S$496 million

=== Depots ===
Depot name; Lines	Location	Image	Line-specific stabling capacity	Cost	Opening
Changi East	Changi		70 trains	S$1.05 billion	2030; 4 years' time
TBA	Tuas		TBA		

== Train control ==
The Cross Island Line will be equipped with Siemens Trainguard Communications-based train control (CBTC) moving block signalling system with Automatic train control (ATC) under Automatic train operation (ATO) GoA 4 (UTO).

== Rolling stock ==
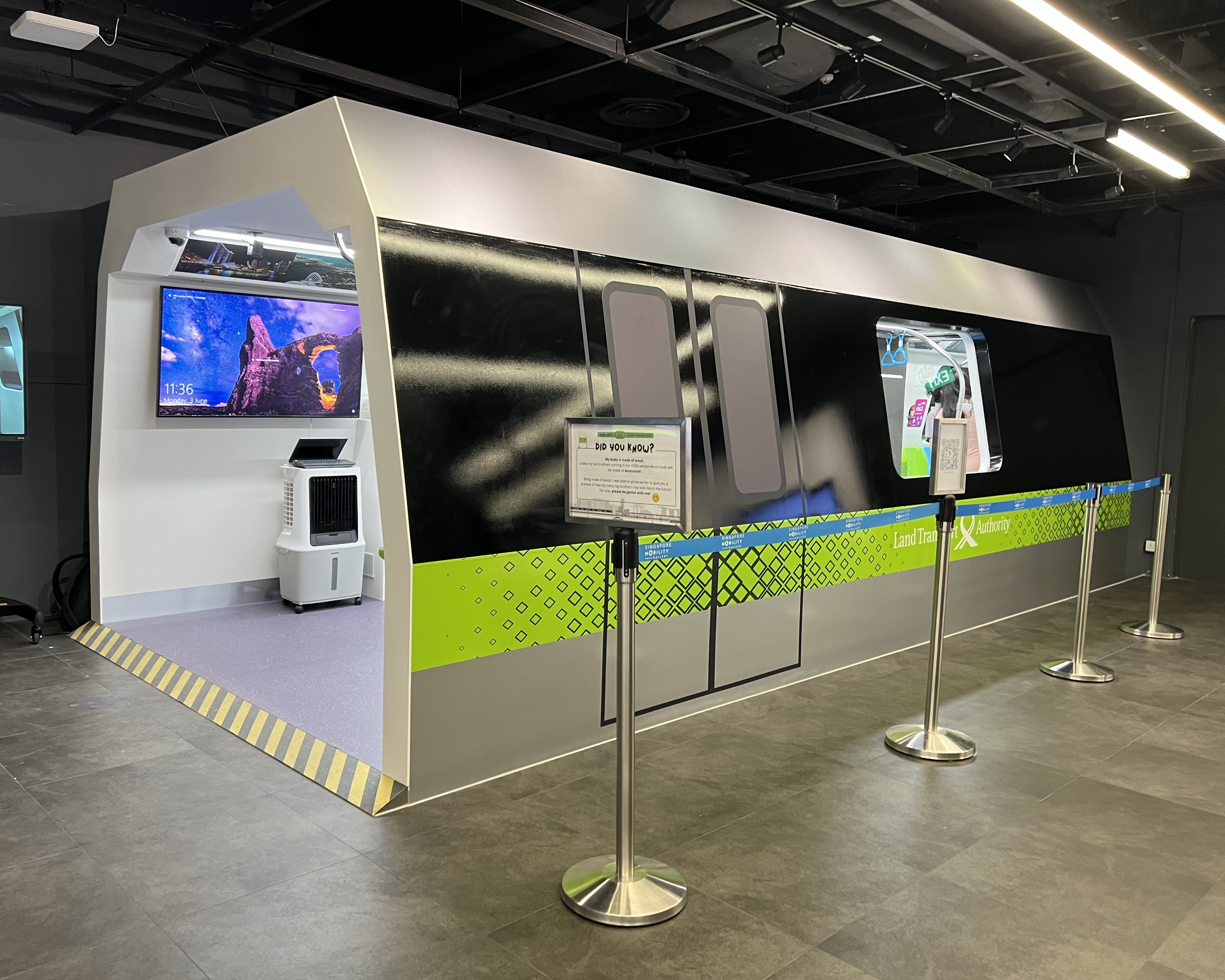
The CR151 mockup displayed at LTA's Hampshire office

Services on the CRL are to be provided by an initial order of six-car electric multiple units (EMU) designed and manufactured by CRRC Qingdao Sifang in Qingdao, China, known as the CRRC Qingdao Sifang CR151. These trains will draw power from an overhead conductor rail for increased acceleration, the second line on the MRT network to do so after the North East Line (NEL), and will be equipped with condition monitoring systems to enable rapid detection of potential faults.

In addition, each carriage will feature five doors per side, similar to the T251 trains on the Thomson–East Coast Line (TEL), and will include wider gangway connections between carriages to facilitate smoother passenger movement both within the train and during boarding and alighting. Platforms on the CRL will be constructed to accommodate eight-car trains, the longest on the MRT network, which are expected to be fully utilised in the early years of operation as commuter demand increases.

The LTA announced that it had awarded the S$589 million contract for the supply of trains for the line on 14 June 2023. Initially comprising a 44-train order, it includes an option for 11 more trains and for maintenance support of the train fleet. The trains were scheduled to be delivered progressively from 2027 onwards. A CRL Train Mixed Reality Mock-up was displayed at LTA's Hampshire office as a public engagement exercise.

The first train, set 5002, arrived at Jurong Port from Qingdao in late May 2026.
