= Changi Terminal 5 MRT station =

Future Mass Rapid Transit station in Singapore

Changi Terminal 5 TE32 CR1 樟宜第五搭客大厦 சாங்கி ஐந்தாம் முனையம்
- Artist's impression of the future station's platform level

General information
- Coordinates: 01°19′28″N 103°59′34″E
- System: Future Mass Rapid Transit (MRT) interchange and terminus
- Owner: Land Transport Authority
- Operator: SMRT Trains (Thomson–East Coast Line)
- Line: Thomson–East Coast Line Cross Island Line

Construction
- Structure type: Underground

History
- Opening: mid-2030s

Services
Preceding station	Mass Rapid Transit	Following station
Sungei Bedok towards Woodlands North	Thomson–East Coast Line Future service	Changi Airport towards Tanah Merah
Terminus	Cross Island Line Future service	Aviation Park towards Jurong Lake District
Location
- Location within Singapore Rail

Changi Terminal 5 MRT station is a future underground Mass Rapid Transit (MRT) interchange and terminal station on the Cross Island Line (CRL) and Thomson–East Coast Line (TEL). It will serve the future Changi Airport Terminal 5.

== History ==
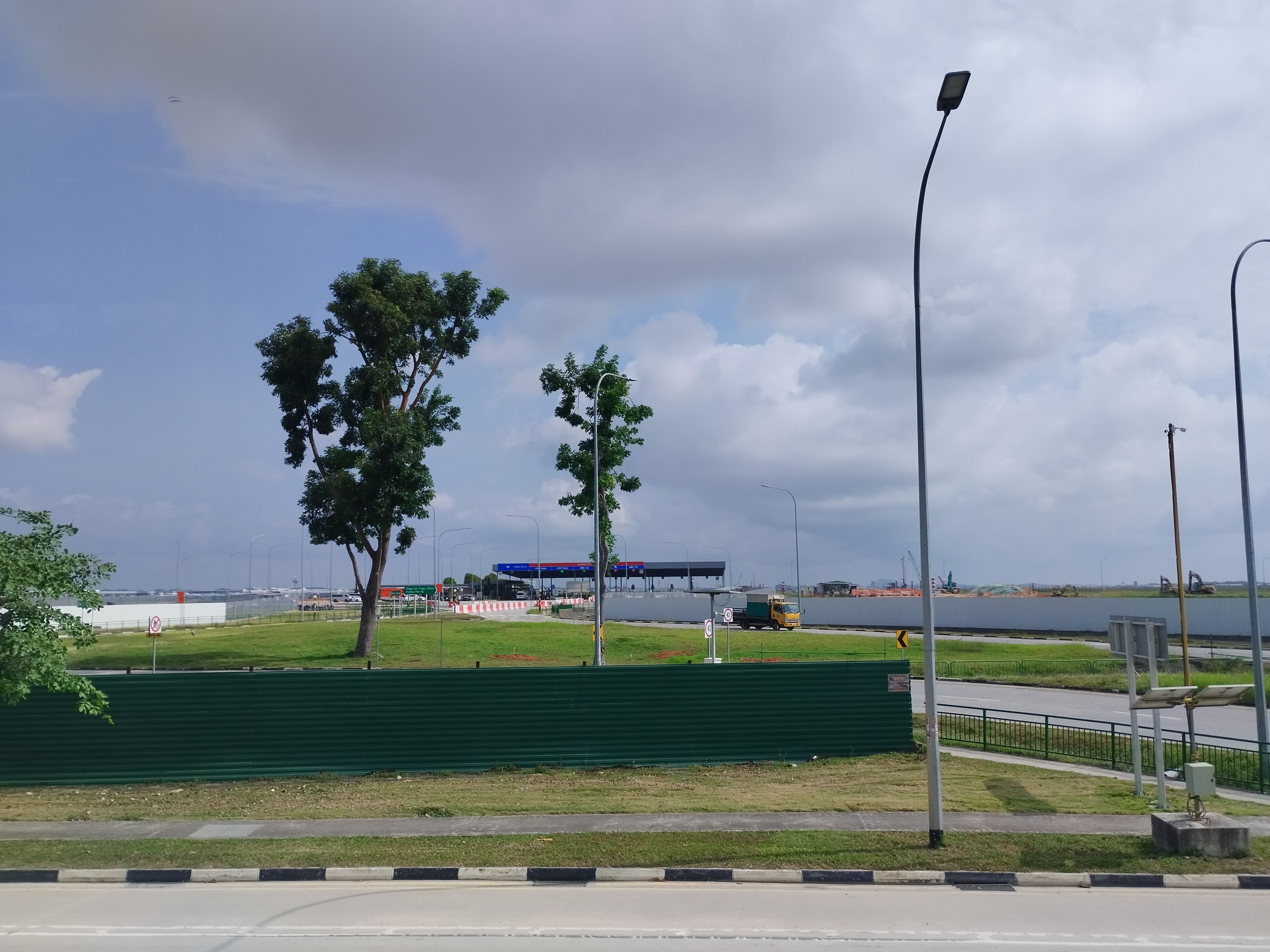
Entrance to Changi Airport T5 site

In July 2016, during the groundbreaking ceremony for the eastern stretch of the Thomson–East Coast Line (TEL), then Transport Minister Khaw Boon Wan announced the possibility of extending the TEL to Changi Airport, to provide a more direct connection from the airport to the city. The extension will open along with the future Terminal 5 of the airport. In March 2017, The Straits Times published an article mentioning the likelihood of the MRT station at Terminal 5 to interchange with the Cross Island Line (CRL), though plans for that were yet to be finalised. This was later confirmed by LTA in January 2019, during the announcement of Phase 1 of the CRL, stating that the station code "CR1" will be reserved for a station in Terminal 5. Later that year on 25 May, LTA published the Land Transport Masterplan 2040, which confirmed the extension of both lines to the Terminal 5, with plans for the TEL to further extend to the existing Changi Airport MRT station on the East–West Line and absorb the Changi Airport branch of that line, which includes Expo and Tanah Merah stations.

In 2019, contract T316 for the construction of twin bored tunnels from Changi Airport station to Terminal 5 was awarded to Shanghai Tunnel Engineering Co (Singapore) Pte Ltd for S$321.7 million (US$240.07 million).

On 14 May 2025, during the groundbreaking of Terminal 5, the airport operator Changi Airport Group gave further confirmation of plans to extend the TEL and CRL to the terminal, and the first render of the station design was unveiled. Later on 25 July, the Land Transport Authority officially unveiled the alignment of TELe and the location of Changi Terminal 5 station.

== Details ==
The station will be built in the Terminal 5 ground transport centre. The sculpted columns and ceilings of the future station are designed to evoke rain trees, which, according to Changi Airport Group, would create a sense of connection to nature.
