= Changi Tree =

Famous tree in Singapore

Coordinates: 1.3774°N 103.981°E

The Changi Tree, also known as The Time Tree, was a tree in eastern Singapore that was noted for its height of 76 m (249 ft). The species of the tree is unclear, but it was either Hopea sangal or Sindora wallichii. It has been said that Changi was named after this tree. It has been recorded that Changi was named after Neobalanocarpus heimii by the legendary botanist H.N. Ridley. However, there has been no evidence that the tree had ever been in Changi.

== History ==
The Changi Tree started appearing on maps at around 1888. The tree was a major landmark due to its height.

In February 1942, during World War II, the tree was cut by the British in order to prevent the Japanese from using the tree as a ranging point. According to local folklore, the fall of the tree would cause the fall of Singapore itself.

In February 2001, the Singapore Tourism Board planted a new "Changi tree" at the Changi Museum.

== See also ==
- List of individual trees
