= Changi East Depot =

Future MRT depot in Singapore

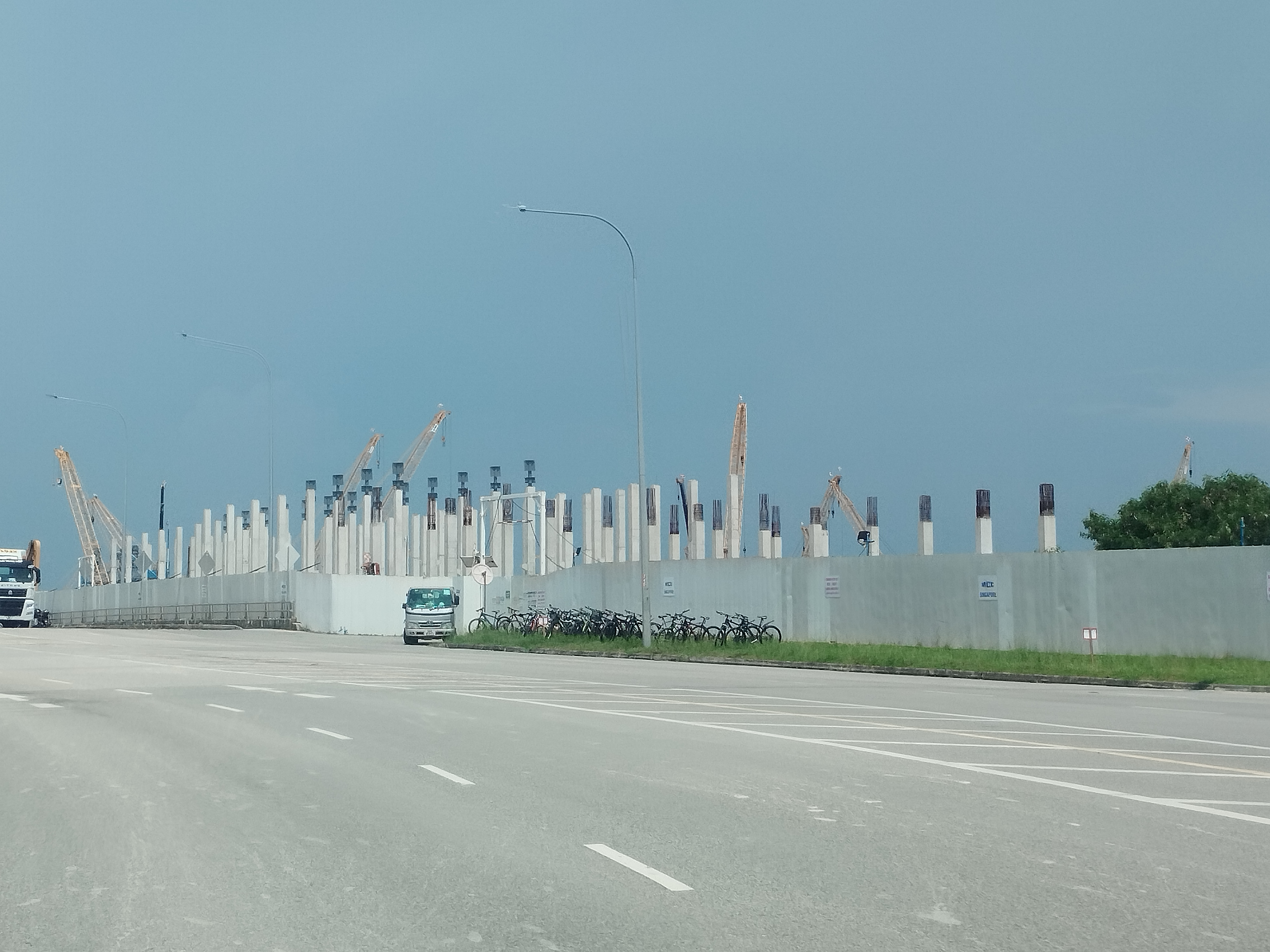
- Changi East Depot construction site in May 2025
- Interactive map of Changi East Depot

Location
- Location: 1 Tanah Merah Coast Lane; Singapore 499859

Characteristics
- Owner: Land Transport Authority
- Type: At-grade
- Roads: Aviation Park Road, Tanah Merah Coast Road
- Rolling stock: CRRC Qingdao Sifang CR151
- Routes served: CRL Cross Island Line

History
- Opened: 2030; 4 years' time

Changi East Depot is a future train depot in Changi, Singapore. At 57 ha (140-acre), the at-grade depot will house 70 to 80 trains of the Cross Island Line (CRL) fleet. The depot will be located along Aviation Park Road near the Changi Exhibition Centre. Other facilities of the depot include the Operations Control Centre (OCC) for the CRL. First announced in 2019, the depot is expected to begin operation in 2030 along with the first stage of the CRL.

== History ==
On 25 January 2019, Transport Minister Khaw Boon Wan announced that the 57-hectare (140-acre) depot would serve the Cross Island Line (CRL). The depot was expected to be completed in 2029 along with CRL Phase 1. The depot was initially planned to be constructed underground, but will be constructed at-grade instead. The restrictions imposed on construction works due to the COVID-19 pandemic led to delays and the CRL1 completion date was pushed by one year to 2030.

Contract CR101 for the construction of Changi East Depot and its associated facilities was awarded to China Jingye Engineering Corporation Limited (Singapore Branch) at S$1.05 billion on 28 May 2021. Construction will begin in the second half of 2021, with a scheduled completion date of 2030. The contract for the design and construction of 6 kilometres (3.7 miles) of tunnels between the depot and the nearby Aviation Park station was awarded to a joint venture between Shanghai Tunnel Engineering Co (Singapore) Pte Ltd and LT Sambo Co. Ltd. (Singapore Branch). The S$780 million (US$571.8 million) construction project would involve tunneling up to 40 metres (130 ft) deep in soft marine clay. The ground would have to be strengthened before the commencement of construction works.

== Details ==
The station will be built along Aviation Park Road near the Changi Exhibition Centre. The depot will encompass an area of 57 hectares (140 acres) and house 70 to 80 CRL trains. Other facilities of the depot include stabling and maintenance equipment for the trains and the CRL Operation Control Centre.
