= Jurong Lake District MRT station =

Future Mass Rapid Transit station in Singapore

Jurong Lake District CR19 裕廊湖区 ஜூரோங் லேக் வட்டாரம்
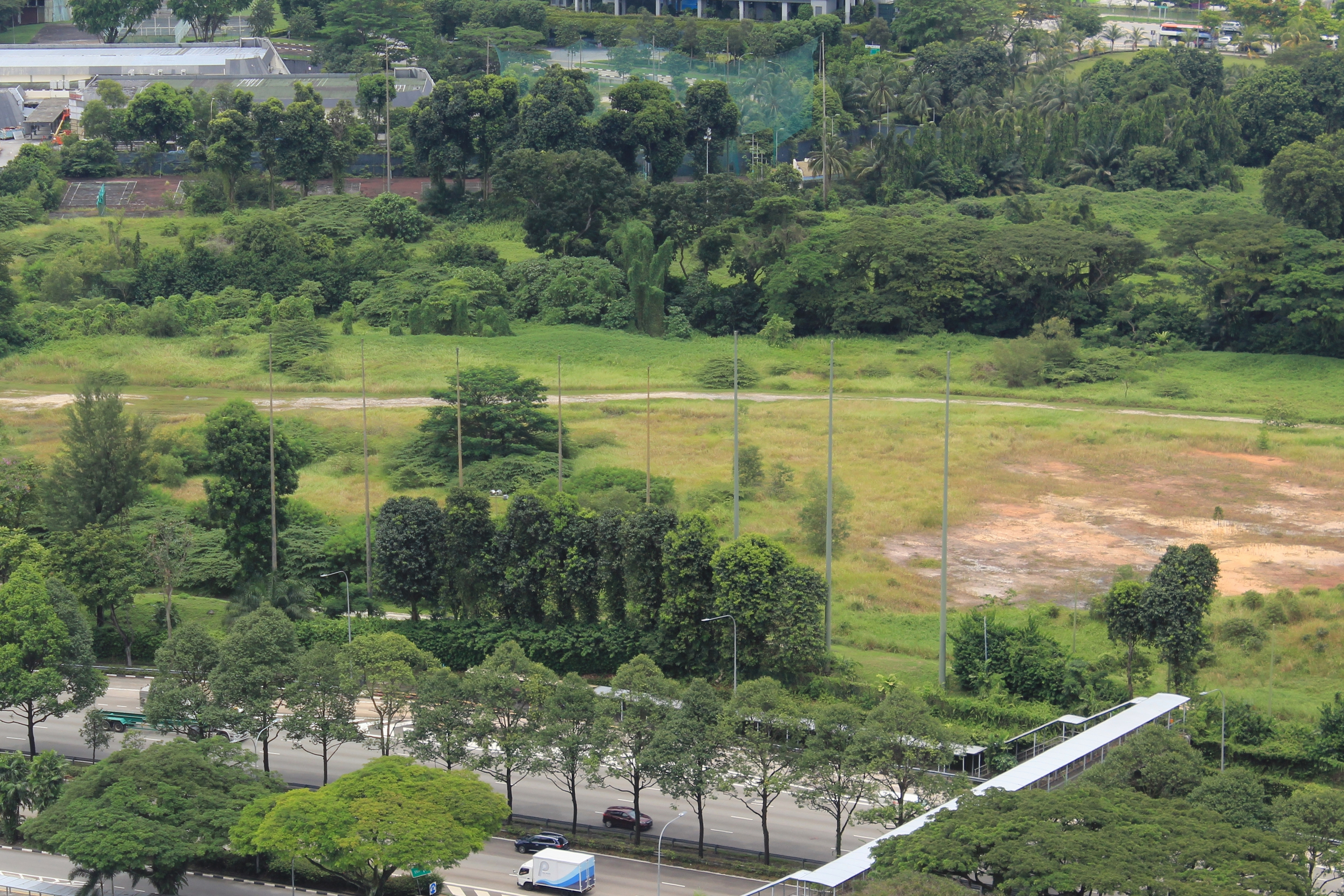
- Future site of the Jurong Lake District station in the future Jurong Lake District

General information
- Coordinates: 01°19′38″N 103°44′21″E
- System: Future Mass Rapid Transit (MRT) station
- Owner: Land Transport Authority
- Line: Cross Island Line
- Platforms: 2 (1 island platform)
- Connections: JE5 NS1 EW24 Jurong East JE6 Jurong Town Hall; Bus, Taxi

Construction
- Structure type: Underground
- Accessible: Yes

Other information
- Station code: JLD

History
- Opening: 2032; 6 years' time

Services
Preceding station	Mass Rapid Transit	Following station
West Coast towards Aviation Park	Cross Island Line Future service	Terminus
West Coast towards Changi Terminal 5	Cross Island Line Future service	CR20 towards Gul Circle
Location
- Location within Singapore Rail

Jurong Lake District MRT station is a future underground Mass Rapid Transit (MRT) station on the Cross Island Line (CRL) located in Jurong East, Singapore. First announced in September 2022, the station is expected to be completed in 2032 along with the other CRL Phase 2 stations.

== History ==
Jurong Lake District station was first announced on 20 September 2022 by then Transport Minister S Iswaran. The station will be constructed as part of Phase 2 of the Cross Island line (CRL), a 15-kilometre (9.3 mi) segment spanning six stations from Turf City station to this station. The station is expected to be completed in 2032.

In June 2024, the contract for the construction of tunnels between the West Coast and Jurong Lake District stations was awarded to a joint venture between Nishimatsu Construction Co Ltd and Okumura Corporation for S$242 million (US$177.4 million). In July, the contract for the design and construction of this station was awarded to KTC Civil Engineering & Construction Pte Ltd for S$590 million (US$432.5 million).

== Details ==
Jurong Lake District station will serve the CRL and have an official station code of CR19. The station will be located in the future Jurong Lake District near the Ayer Rajah Expressway.

Due to the station's proximity to the nearby Jurong Town Hall station on the Jurong Region line, then Transport Minister S Iswaran stated a connection between the two stations is being studied, but added that the two stations are intended to serve "different commuter movement objectives". In 2024, in response to then Non-Constituency Member of Parliament Leong Mun Wai's comments regarding the quality of public transport in the west, Senior state of transport minister Amy Khor stated that there will be a "good pedestrian connectivity between the two stations".

The station will be connected to Jurong East MRT via multi-level pedestrian linkages. An underground link will be constructed by the Land Transport Authority to the white site at Town Hall Link. Temporary sheltered walkways will be provided to Jurong East MRT until the remaining 2 sites, which were initially part of the Jurong Lake District master developer site, are completed. Based on the URA Master Plan 2025 Urban Design Guidelines, the underground link will end near Jurong Town Hall Road, and an elevated walkway will be provided across Jurong Town Hall Road and Jurong Gateway Road to Jurong East MRT directly.

The station is planned to be a designated Civil Defence shelter.
