= Bright Hill MRT station =

Mass Rapid Transit station in Singapore

Bright Hill TE7 CR13 光明山 பிரைட் ஹில்
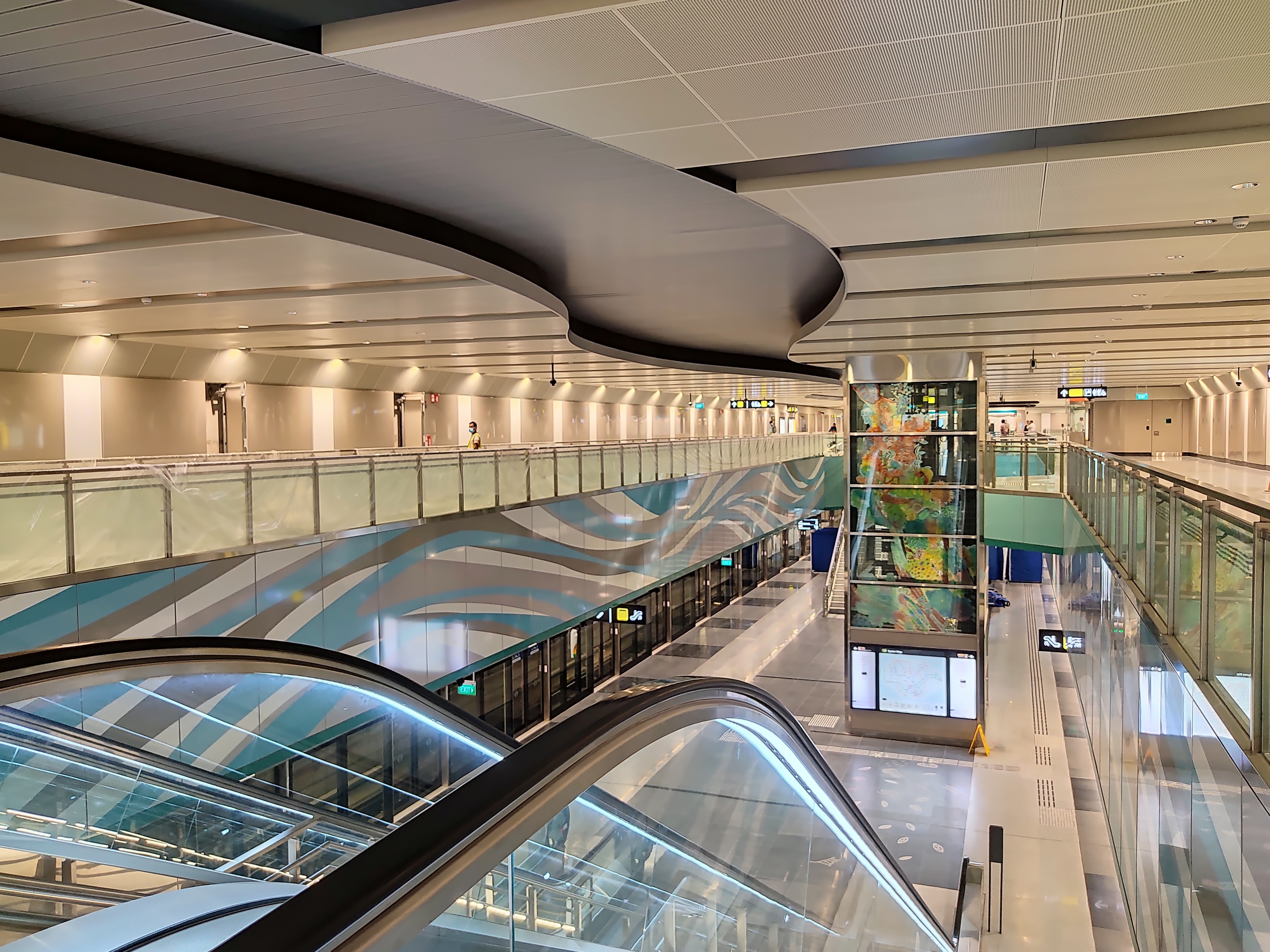
- View of the station platform and concourse

General information
- Location: 100 Sin Ming Avenue, Singapore 575737
- Coordinates: 01°21′50″N 103°50′05″E
- System: Mass Rapid Transit (MRT) station
- Owner: Land Transport Authority
- Operator: SMRT Trains (Thomson–East Coast Line)
- Line: Thomson–East Coast Line Cross Island Line
- Platforms: 2 (1 island platform) + 2 (2 side platforms) (U/C)
- Tracks: 2 + 2 (U/C)
- Connections: Bus, Taxi

Construction
- Structure type: Underground
- Depth: 20 metres (66 ft)
- Platform levels: 1 + 1 (U/C)
- Parking: Yes
- Cycle facilities: Yes
- Accessible: Yes

Other information
- Station code: BRH

History
- Opened: 28 August 2021; 5 years ago (Thomson–East Coast Line)
- Opening: 2030; 4 years' time (Cross Island Line)
- Former names: Sin Ming, Bishan Park

Passengers
- June 2024: 5,284 per day

Services
Preceding station	Mass Rapid Transit	Following station
Mayflower towards Woodlands North	Thomson–East Coast Line	Upper Thomson towards Bayshore
Teck Ghee towards Aviation Park	Cross Island Line Future service	Terminus
Teck Ghee towards Aviation Park	Cross Island Line Future service	Turf City towards Jurong Lake District
Track layout
Location
- Location within Singapore Rail

Bright Hill MRT station is an underground Mass Rapid Transit station on the Thomson–East Coast Line (TEL). Situated along Sin Ming Avenue in western Bishan, Singapore, it serves various residential estates around the station. It also serves landmarks such as Peirce Secondary School, Ai Tong School, Bishan-Ang Mo Kio Park and the Kong Meng San Phor Kark See Monastery.

First announced as Sin Ming MRT station in August 2012, the station was constructed as part of TEL Phase 2 (TEL 2). Since the station was built in a heavily developed area, the bored piles were installed using specialised machinery due to hard granite at the site. In January 2019, it was announced that the station will become an interchange with the future Cross Island Line (CRL).

After delays, Bright Hill station opened on 28 August 2021 along with the TEL 2 stations. Bright Hill station, a Civil Defence (CD) shelter, is 20 metres (66 ft) deep and has four entrances. An Art-in-Transit artwork, A Kaleidoscope Nature by Angie Seah, is featured at this station.

== History ==
=== Thomson–East Coast Line ===
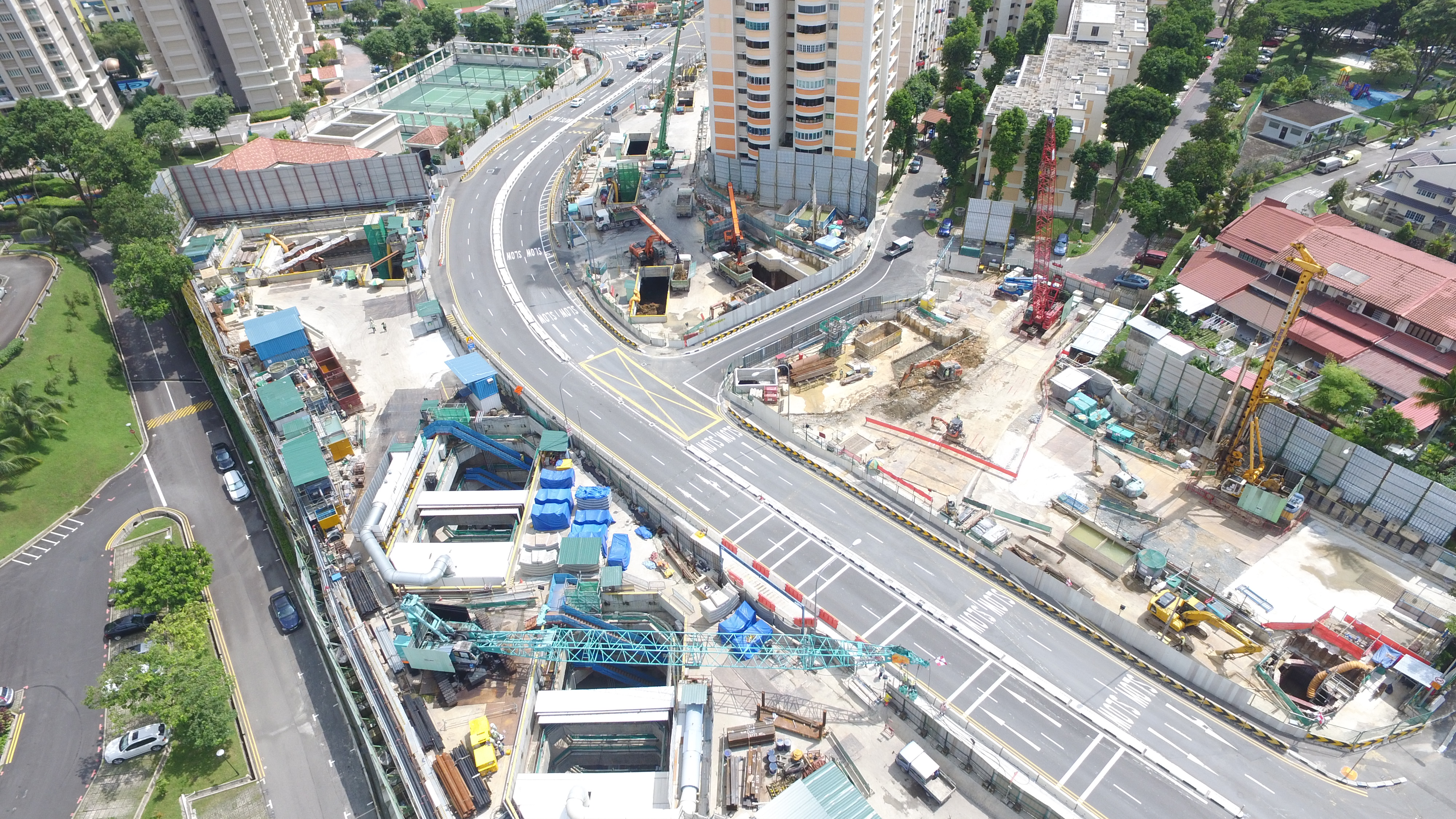
Construction works of the TEL station in 2016

On 29 August 2012, the station was first announced as Sin Ming station as part of the 22-station Thomson Line (TSL). In February 2014, the contract for the station's construction was awarded to Penta-Ocean Construction Co. Ltd. The S$454 million (US$362.8 million) contract included building the associated tunnels. The station's construction began in 2014, with a scheduled completion date of 2020.

On 15 August 2014, the Land Transport Authority (LTA) announced that the TSL would merge with the Eastern Region Line to form the Thomson–East Coast Line (TEL). Bright Hill station, along the proposed line, would be constructed as part of TEL 2, consisting of six stations between Springleaf and Caldecott.

To install the bored piles that would be part of the earth-retaining stabilising structure, specialised machinery was used due to the hard granite rocks at the site. The structure was needed for soil retention and to facilitate underground excavation works. The roads above the station needed to be diverted several times. Barriers were installed to minimise noise pollution, and workers draped noise curtains on heavy machinery. For the soft soil and loose sand at the ground underneath Inglewood Estate and Kallang River, soil strengthening works took place before the tunnels were bored. The foundation of a residential building had to be strengthened for safety when tunnelling works commenced underneath the building.

With restrictions imposed on construction due to the COVID-19 pandemic, the TEL 2 completion date was pushed to 2021. On 14 December 2020, it was further announced that the opening of TEL 2 was delayed to the third quarter of 2021 so the rail system software for the line could be reviewed. As announced during a visit by Transport Minister S. Iswaran at Caldecott station on 30 June 2021, the station began operations on 28 August 2021.

=== Cross Island Line ===
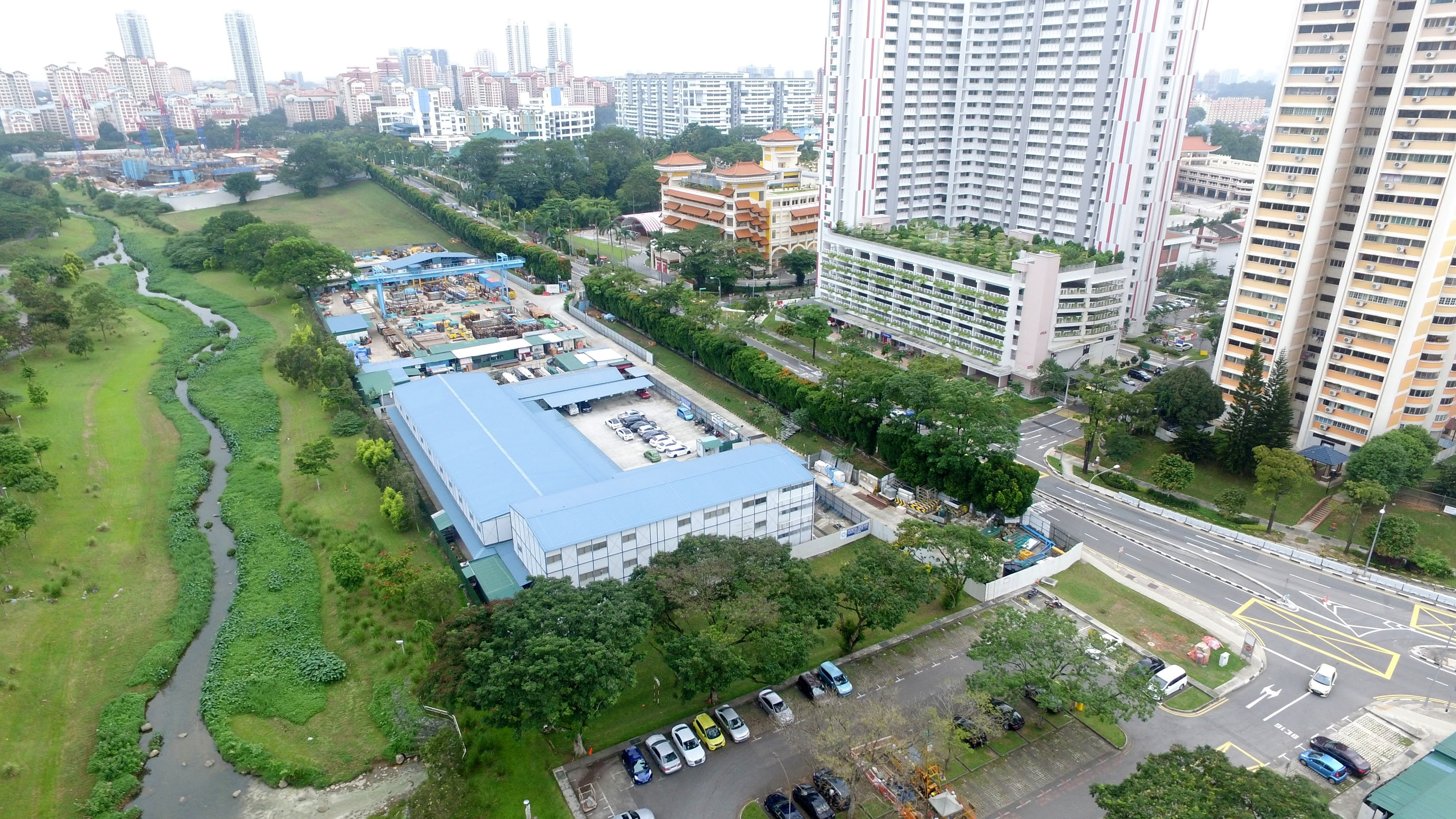
Soil investigation works at the CRL station site

On 25 January 2019, the LTA announced that Bright Hill station would be an interchange with the proposed Cross Island Line (CRL). The station will be constructed as the terminus of Phase 1 (CRL1), which will contain 12 stations and operate to Aviation Park. CRL1 was expected to be completed in 2029. However, the restrictions imposed on construction works due to the COVID-19 pandemic led to delays and the CRL1 completion date was pushed by one year to 2030.

The contract for the design and construction of the CRL station and associated tunnels was awarded to Penta-Ocean Construction Co. Ltd. at S$526 million (US$392.54 million) on 30 March 2022. Concurrent with construction works, Sin Ming Avenue will be pedestrianised to establish a Transit Priority Corridor along the road, which will include new cycling paths and bus lanes. Construction is scheduled to start in the second quarter of 2022, with an expected completion date of 2030.

== Station details ==
Bright Hill station serves the Thomson–East Coast Line (TEL) and is between the Mayflower and Upper Thomson stations. The official station code is TE7. Being part of the TEL, the station is operated by SMRT Trains. Train frequencies on the TEL range from 3 to 6 minutes. The station will be the terminus of CRL1, with the adjacent station being Teck Ghee. The station has four entrances and serves various landmarks such as Bishan-Ang Mo Kio Park, Bright Hill Columbarium and Crematorium and the Kong Meng San Temple. Schools surrounding the station include Eunoia Junior College, Ai Tong School and Peirce Secondary School.

The station is 240 metres (790 ft) long and 20 metres (66 ft) deep. Designated as a Civil Defence (CD) shelter, Bright Hill station's interior is designed to accommodate up to 6,000 people in emergencies. It has a reinforced structure with blast doors. During a chemical attack, the air vents of the station can be shut to prevent the circulation of toxic gases. The CD shelter has dedicated cubicles for chemical decontamination alongside dry toilets.

The station roof over the platform level has a wave-like pattern that references the nearby Kallang River. The gaps in the ceiling are intended to reflect crown shyness, a natural phenomenon in which the crowns of the trees avoid touching each other. An Art-in-Transit artwork, A Kaleidoscopic Nature by Angie Seah, is displayed on the station's lift shaft. Depicting colours and patterns derived from plants at the nearby park, the work was created using gouache, watercolour, acrylic paints, inks and markers.
