= Aviation Park MRT station =

Future Mass Rapid Transit station in Singapore

Aviation Park CR2 航空园 ஏவியேஷன் பார்க் Taman Penerbangan
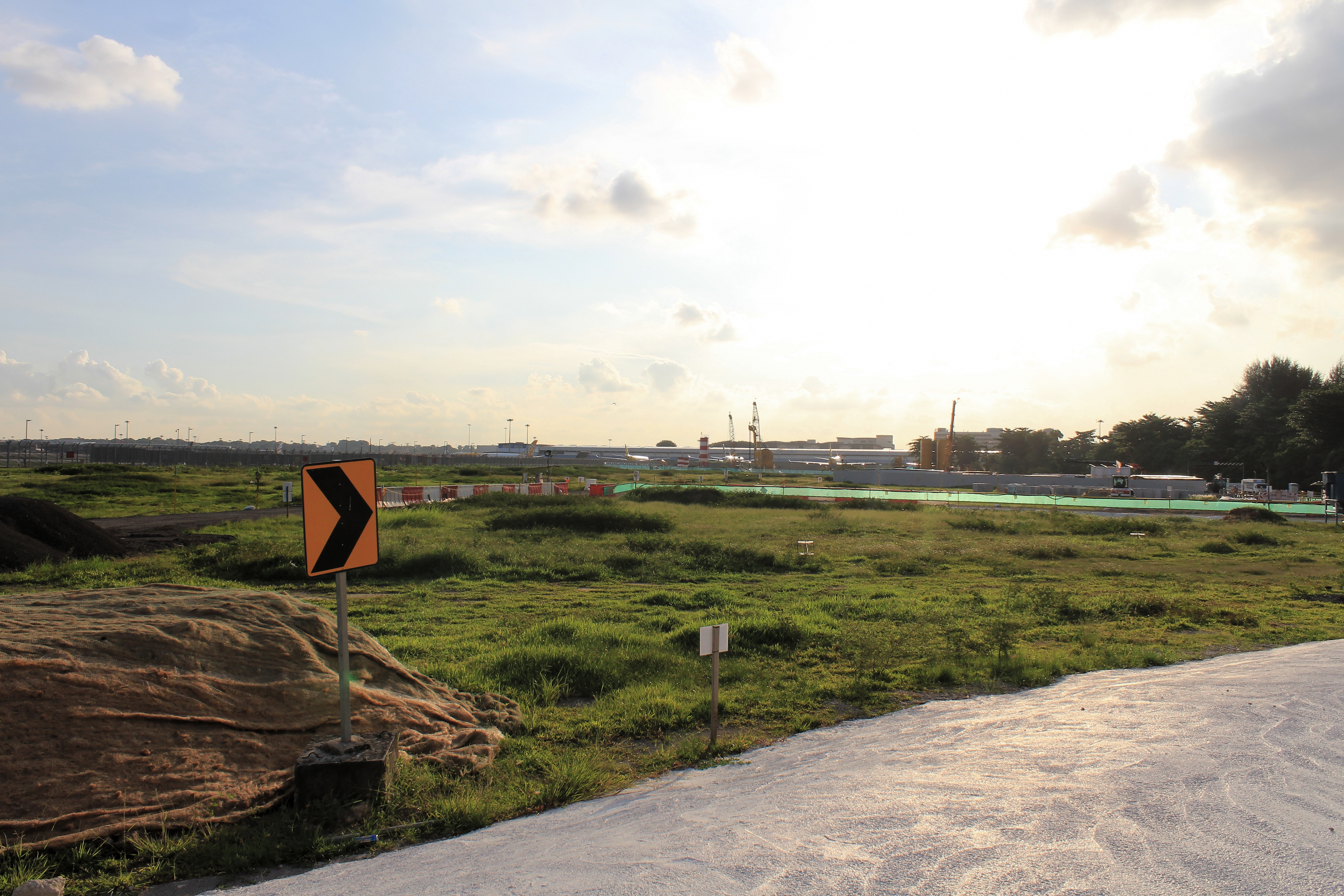
- Aviation Park MRT station site

General information
- Coordinates: 01°22′12″N 104°00′11″E
- System: Future Mass Rapid Transit (MRT) station
- Owner: Land Transport Authority
- Line: Cross Island Line
- Platforms: 2 (2 side platforms)
- Tracks: 4
- Connections: Bus, Taxi

Construction
- Structure type: Underground
- Accessible: Yes

Other information
- Station code: AVP

History
- Opening: 2030; 4 years' time

Services
Preceding station	Mass Rapid Transit	Following station
Terminus	Cross Island Line Future service	Loyang towards Bright Hill
Changi Terminal 5 Terminus	Cross Island Line Future service	Loyang towards Jurong Lake District
Track layout
Location
- Location within Singapore Rail

Aviation Park MRT station is a future underground Mass Rapid Transit station on the Cross Island Line (CRL) located in Changi, Singapore, located next to Changi Coast Road and Aviation Park Road. The station will serve the Airport Logistics Park of Singapore, FedEx – TNT Ship Center, Changi Exhibition Centre, Changi Ferry Terminal and Changi Beach Park.

First announced in January 2019, the station will be the eastern terminus of the CRL when it opens in 2030. By the mid-2030s, the CRL will be extended east of Aviation Park station to Changi Terminal 5 station.

== History ==
On 25 January 2019, the Land Transport Authority (LTA) announced that Aviation Park station would be part of the proposed Cross Island Line (CRL). The station will be constructed as the eastern terminus of phase 1 & 2, which will consist of 18 stations between this station and Jurong Lake District station. It was expected to be completed in 2029. However, the restrictions imposed on construction works due to the COVID-19 pandemic led to delays and the CRL1 completion date was pushed by one year to 2030.

On 8 March 2021, the LTA awarded Contract CR105 to Taisei Corporation – China State Construction Engineering Corporation Limited Singapore Branch Joint Venture. The S$356 million (US$261 million) contract involved the design and construction of bored tunnels between the Aviation Park and Loyang stations. Construction works for the 3.2-kilometre (2.0-mile) tunnel started in the second quarter of 2021 and is targeted to be completed by 2030 when CRL1 commences passenger service. For the first time, the LTA used a large-diameter tunnel boring machine to construct a single tunnel with two tracks in it. Another contract for the construction of tunnels between this station and Changi East Depot was awarded on 16 December 2021 to a joint venture of Shanghai Tunnel Engineering Co (Singapore) Pte Ltd and LT Sambo Co Ltd (Singapore Branch) at S$780 million (US$571.8 million). The 6-kilometre (3.7-mile) of tunnels are being built underneath Aviation Park Road, with an average depth of 20 metres (66 ft).

On 8 November 2021, the contract for the design and construction of Aviation Park Station and associated tunnels (Contract CR103) was awarded to Hock Lian Seng Infrastructure Pte Ltd at S$320 million (US$234.6 million). Construction started in the first quarter of 2022, with the station targeted to complete in 2030. Due to the station's proximity to Changi Airport, construction works have to comply with aviation height restrictions. The soil, largely made of soft marine clay, had to be stabilised using an earth retaining stabilising structure for excavation works.

The contract for the design and construction of tunnels between this station and the Changi East Depot was awarded to a joint venture between Shanghai Tunnel Engineering Co (Singapore) Pte Ltd and LT Sambo Co. Ltd. (Singapore Branch). The S$780 million (US$571.8 million) construction project would involve tunneling up to 40 metres (130 ft) deep.
