= Jurong East (disambiguation) =

Jurong East is a planning area and residential town situated in the West Region of Singapore.

Jurong East may also refer to:

- Jurong East Bus Interchange, a bus interchange in Jurong East, Singapore.
- Jurong East MRT station, an Mass Rapid Transit (MRT) station in Jurong East, Singapore.
- Jurong East Stadium, a stadium in Jurong East, Singapore.

== See also ==
- Jurong (disambiguation)
