= Jem, Singapore =

Jem
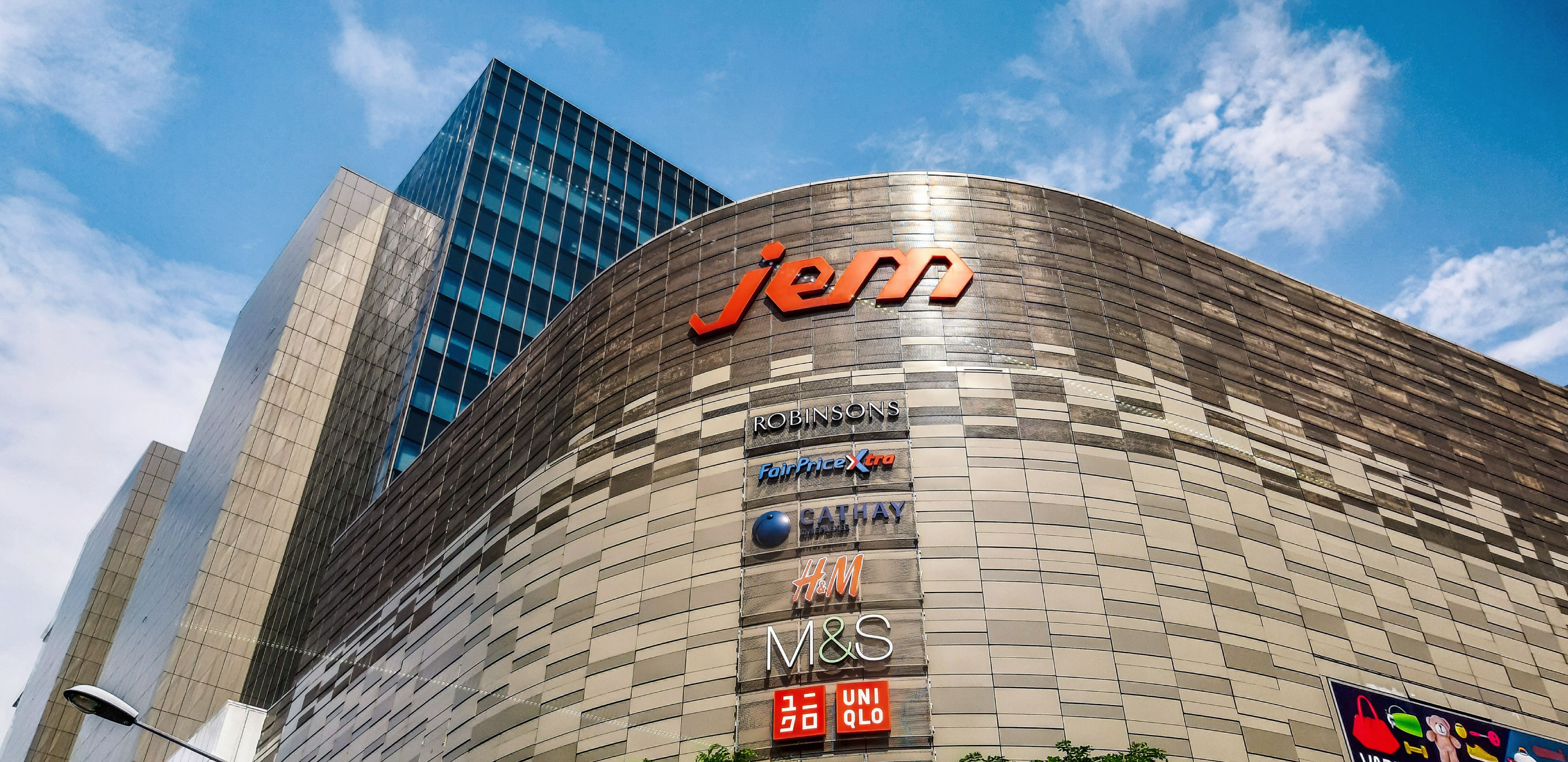
- Location: Jurong East, Singapore
- Coordinates: 1.3332°N 103.74338°E
- Address: 50 Jurong Gateway Road, Singapore 608549
- Opened: 15 June 2013; 13 years ago
- Manager: Lendlease
- Owner: Lendlease
- Num. of stores: 241
- Num. of anchor tenants: 9
- Floor area: 818,000 square feet (76,000 m^{2})
- Floors: 9
- Parking: 340
- Public transit: EW24 JE5 NS1 Jurong East
- Website: www.jem.sg

Jem is a suburban mall in Jurong East, Singapore. The mall is directly connected to Jurong East MRT station and close to Jurong East Bus Interchange. It is also located adjacent to another mall, Westgate.

== Overview ==
Jem is Singapore's third-largest suburban mall housing 241 shop units with over 818,000 square feet of retail space across six levels. Jem's name is an abbreviation of its original name, Jurong East Mall, and is a wordplay reference of the mall as the "crown jewel" of Jurong and western Singapore.

The mall is directly connected to the Jurong East MRT interchange station and located at the junction of Jurong Gateway Road and Boon Lay Way. It is also connected to another mall named Westgate.

== History ==
Jem's official opening was initially planned to be on 11 June 2013. Due to initial tenancy issues, the opening of the mall was delayed. On 15 June 2013, Jem finally opened and attracted more than 10,000 shoppers at the time of the opening.

In August 2020, anchor tenant Robinsons was closed down and replaced by IKEA in 2021. As the first small-format IKEA store in Southeast Asia, this outlet will not include a children's playground and built-in warehouse. The outlet opened on 29 April 2021 at 10am.

In March 2025, the 10-screen Cathay Cineplexes Jem was shuttered by the landlord due to rent arrears of S$4.3 million and also mentioned that a new tenant will be taking up its premises. Shaw Organisation and Lendlease announced that Shaw Theaters will replace Cathay Cineplexes, with official opening date currently undisclosed.

In August 2025, Lendlease Global Commercial REIT divested the office component of Jem to Keppel Ltd. for S$462 million. The 12-storey office block, comprising about 311,000 sq ft of net lettable area and fully leased to the Ministry of National Development, was acquired by funds under Keppel’s Sustainable Urban Renewal strategy.
