= Toh Guan MRT station =

Future Mass Rapid Transit station in Singapore

Toh Guan JE4 卓源 டோ குவான்
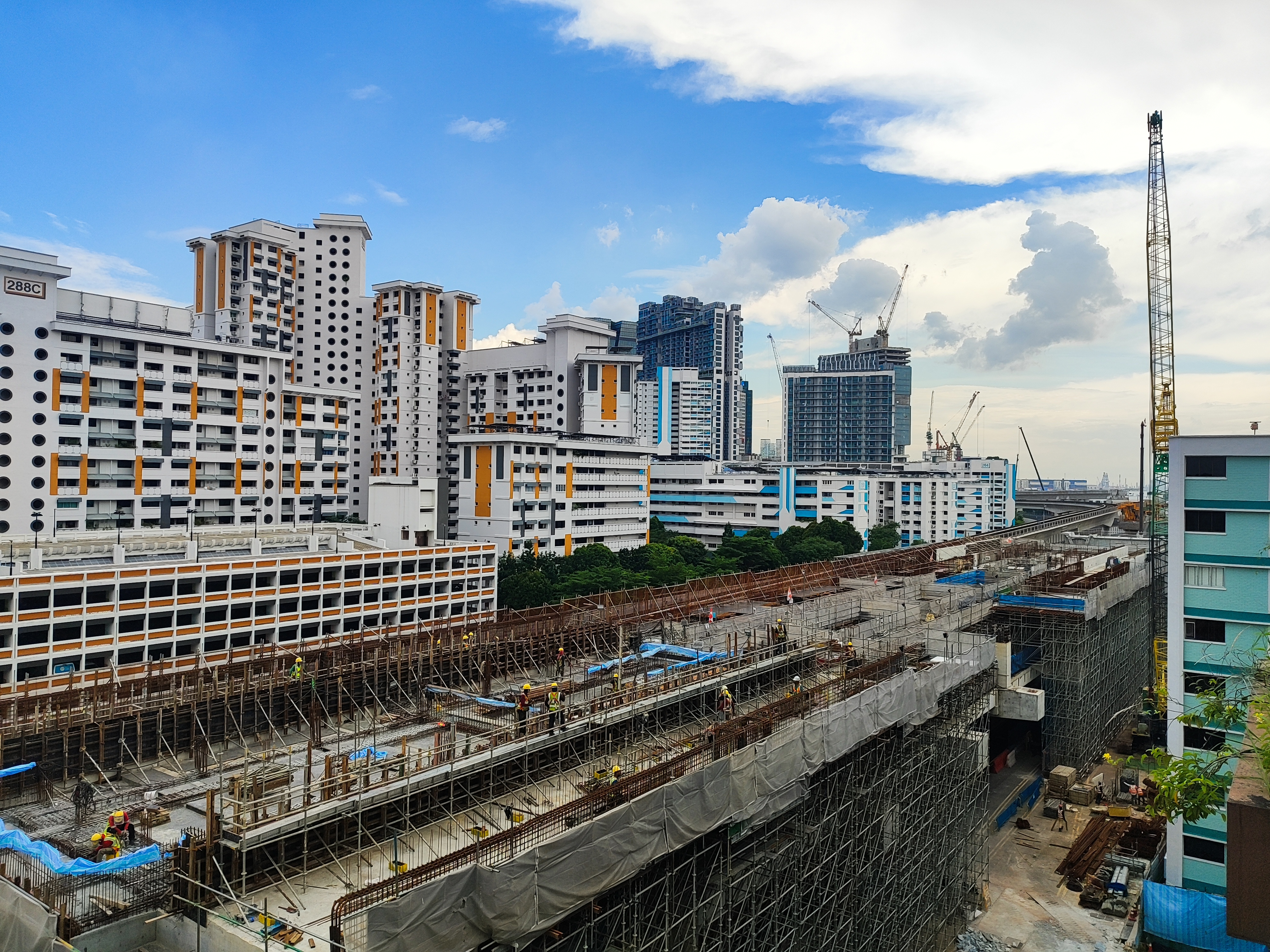
- Toh Guan MRT station site in September 2024

General information
- Coordinates: 01°20′23″N 103°44′33″E
- System: Future Mass Rapid Transit (MRT) station
- Owner: Land Transport Authority
- Operator: Singapore One Rail
- Line: Jurong Region Line
- Platforms: 2 (1 island platform)
- Tracks: 2
- Connections: Bus, Taxi

Construction
- Structure type: Elevated
- Platform levels: 1
- Parking: Yes
- Cycle facilities: Yes
- Accessible: Yes

Other information
- Station code: TGN

History
- Opening: 2028; 2 years' time

Services
Preceding station	Mass Rapid Transit	Following station
Bukit Batok West towards Tengah	Jurong Region Line Future service	Jurong East towards Pandan Reservoir
Track layout
Location
- Location within Singapore Rail

Toh Guan MRT station is a future elevated Mass Rapid Transit (MRT) station on the Jurong Region Line (JRL) in Jurong East, Singapore. Announced on 9 May 2018, it will be constructed as part of Phase 2 of the JRL.

The station is located in the Jurong East planning area at the junction of Toh Guan Road and Jurong East Avenue 1 to the north.

== History ==
On 9 May 2018, the Land Transport Authority (LTA) announced that Toh Guan station would be part of the proposed Jurong Region Line (JRL). The station will be constructed as part of Phase 2, JRL (East), consisting of 7 stations between Tengah and Pandan Reservoir, and is expected to be completed in 2028.

Contract J109 for the design and construction of Toh Guan Station and associated viaducts was awarded to Daewoo Engineering & Construction Co. Pte Ltd - Yongnam Engineering and Construction Pte Ltd Joint Venture at a sum of S$320.4 million in July 2020. Construction is expected to start in 2020. Contract J109 also includes the design and construction of the Jurong Town Hall and Pandan Reservoir stations and the 3.6-kilometre (2.2-mile) associated viaducts.

Initially expected to open in 2027, the restrictions on the construction due to the COVID-19 pandemic has led to delays in the JRL line completion, and the date was pushed to 2028.

== Location ==
The station complex will be straddled over the existing Jurong East Central, with the junction with Toh Guan Road and Jurong East Avenue 1 to the north, and the junction with Jurong East Street 21 to the south. It is located in the Jurong East planning area between the Yuhua East and Toh Guan Subzones, parallel to the North–South Line approach tracks to Jurong East station, nested within housing estates.

Access to the station will be via 2 exits on each side of Jurong East Central.
