= Jurong Town Hall MRT station =

Future Mass Rapid Transit station in Singapore

Jurong Town Hall JE6 裕廊镇大会堂 ஜுராங் டவுன் ஹால்
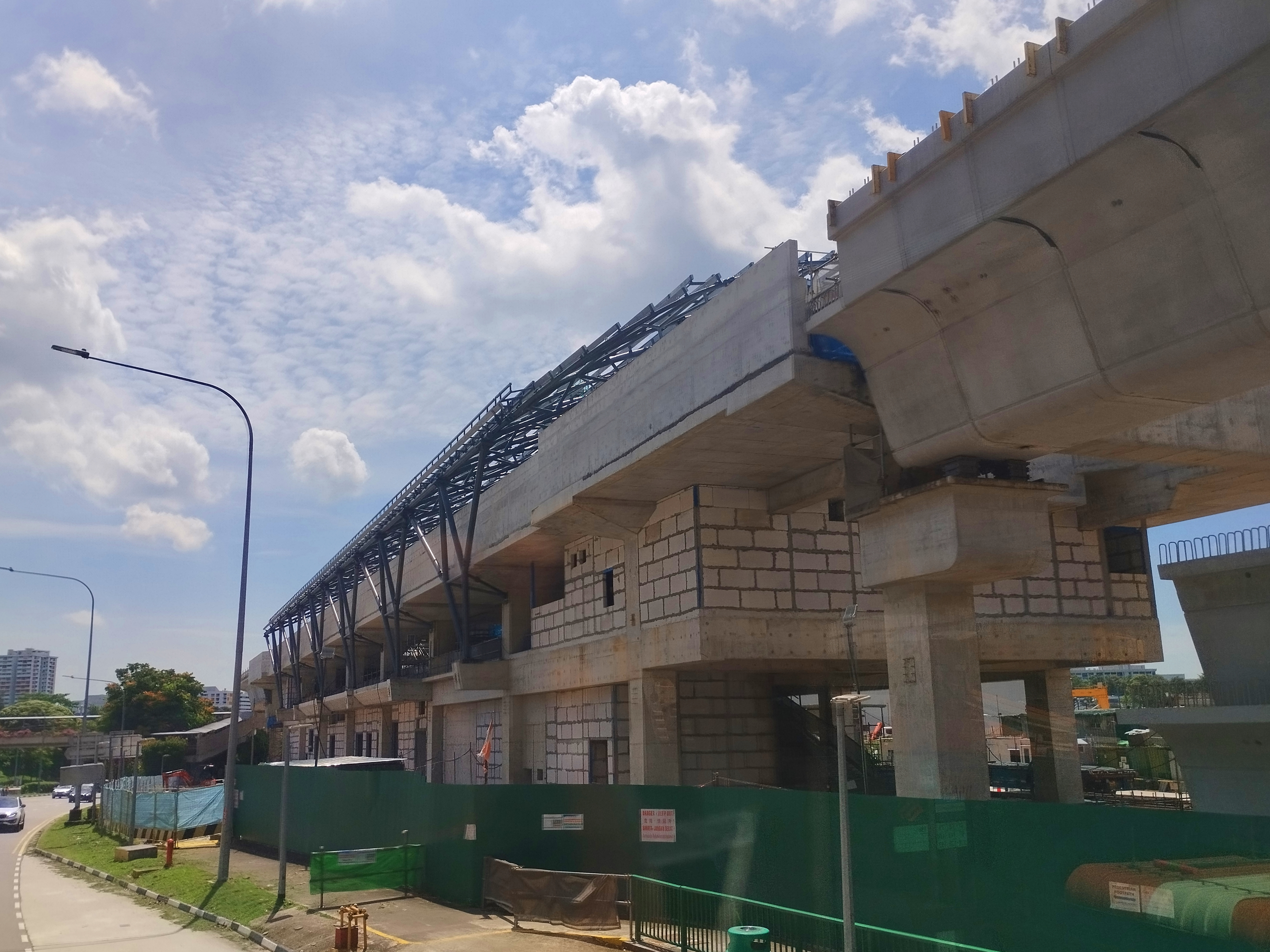
- Jurong Town Hall MRT station site in 2025

General information
- Coordinates: 01°19′34″N 103°44′46″E
- System: Future Mass Rapid Transit (MRT) station
- Owner: Land Transport Authority
- Operator: Singapore One Rail
- Line: Jurong Region Line
- Platforms: 2 (1 island platform)
- Tracks: 2
- Connections: CR19 Jurong Lake District; Bus, Taxi

Construction
- Structure type: Elevated
- Platform levels: 1
- Parking: Yes
- Cycle facilities: Yes
- Accessible: Yes

Other information
- Station code: JTH

History
- Opening: 2028; 2 years' time

Services
Preceding station	Mass Rapid Transit	Following station
Jurong East towards Tengah	Jurong Region Line Future service	Pandan Reservoir Terminus
Location
- Location within Singapore Rail

Jurong Town Hall MRT station is a future elevated Mass Rapid Transit (MRT) station on the Jurong Region Line in Jurong East, Singapore.

== History ==
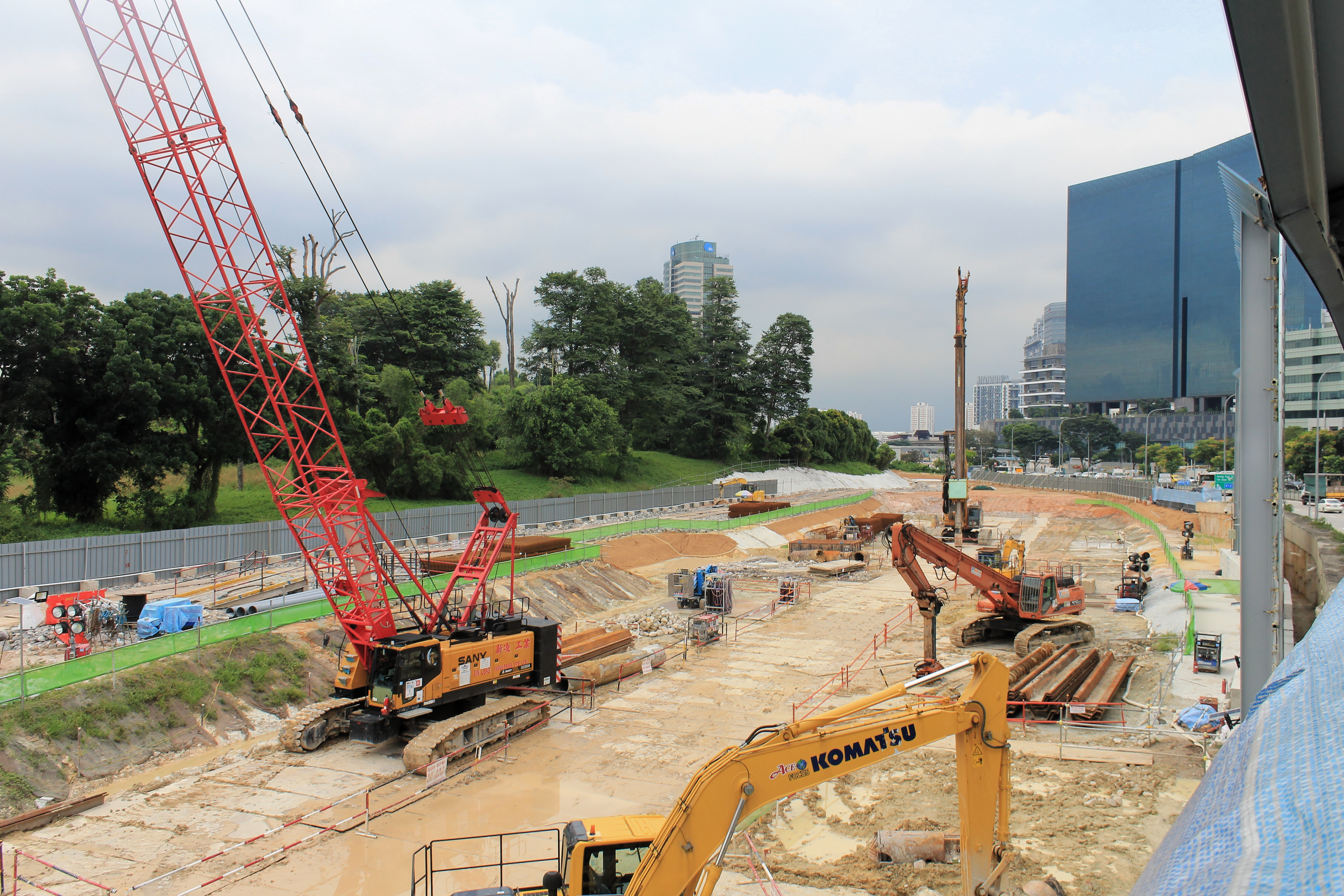
Jurong Town Hall MRT station site in 2022

On 9 May 2018, LTA announced that Jurong Town Hall station would be part of the proposed Jurong Region Line (JRL). The station will be constructed as part of Phase 2, JRL (East), consisting of 7 stations between Tengah and Pandan Reservoir, and is expected to be completed in 2028.

Contract J109 for the design and construction of Jurong Town Hall Station and associated viaducts was awarded to Daewoo Engineering & Construction Co. Pte Ltd - Yongnam Engineering and Construction Pte Ltd Joint Venture at a sum of S$320.4 million in July 2020. Construction is expected to start in 2020. Contract J109 also includes the design and construction of the Toh Guan and Pandan Reservoir stations and the 3.6-kilometre (2.2-mile) associated viaducts.

Initially expected to open in 2027, the restrictions on the construction due to the COVID-19 pandemic has led to delays in the JRL line completion, and the date was pushed to 2028.

== Location ==
The station complex will be next to Jurong Town Hall Road, at the junction with the International Business Park (IBP) roundabout. It is located in the Jurong East planning area between the International Business Park and Lakeside Subzones. It is also one of the three MRT stations slated to serve the Jurong Lake District.

The station will have six exits total, on either side of the Jurong Town Hall Road.

Although the station shares the namesake with Jurong Town Hall Bus Interchange, which serves Bus Services 78/A, 79/T, 160/A, and 870, and cross border CW buses, it is further from the bus interchange than Jurong East MRT.

== Details ==
Jurong Town Hall station will serve the Jurong Region Line (JRL) and have an official station code of JE6. Due to the station's proximity to the nearby Jurong Lake District MRT station on the Cross Island Line, Transport Minister S. Iswaran stated a connection between the two stations is being studied, but added that the two stations are intended to serve "different commuter movement objectives". Senior State of Transport Minister Amy Khor stated that there will be a good pedestrian connectivity between the two stations.
