= Jurong Library =

Regional library in Singapore

Coordinates: 01°19′57.69″N 103°44′22.47″E

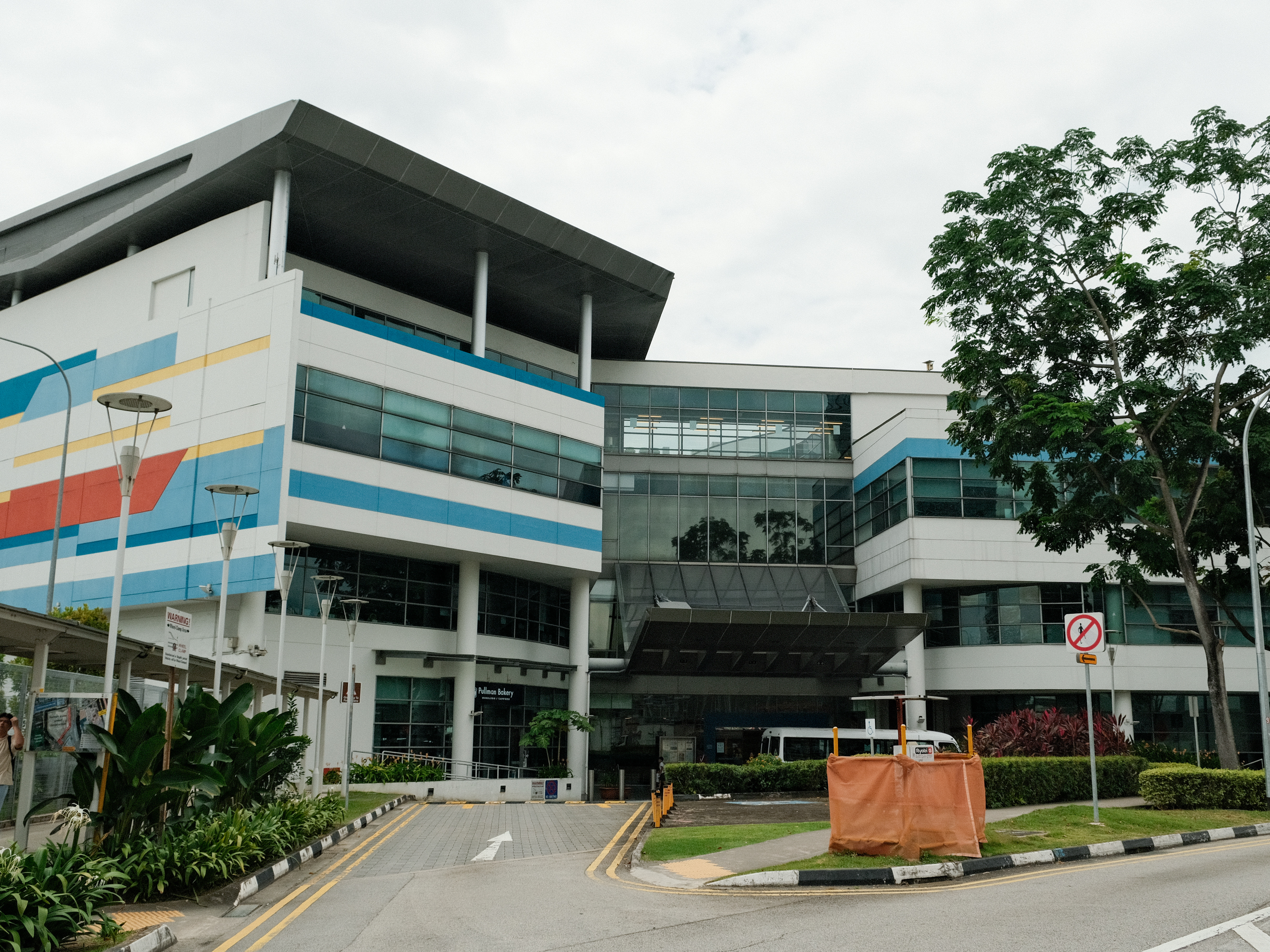
- Library entrance
- Location: 21 Jurong East Central 1, Singapore 609732, Singapore
- Type: Regional Library
- Established: 1 August 1988; 37 years ago (as Jurong East Community Library); 4 June 2004; 22 years ago (as Jurong Regional Library)
- Dissolved: June 2003; 23 years ago (as Jurong East Community Library)
- Branch of: National Library Board

Collection
- Size: 480,000
- Public transit access: NS1 EW24 Jurong East, Jurong East Bus Interchange

Jurong Library (Chinese: 裕廊图书馆; Malay: Perpustakaan Jurong) is a public library located in Jurong East, Singapore. It is located next to the now defunct JCube and is within walking distances of Jurong East Bus Interchange and Jurong East MRT station. It is the third regional library to be completed after the Tampines and Woodlands regional libraries.

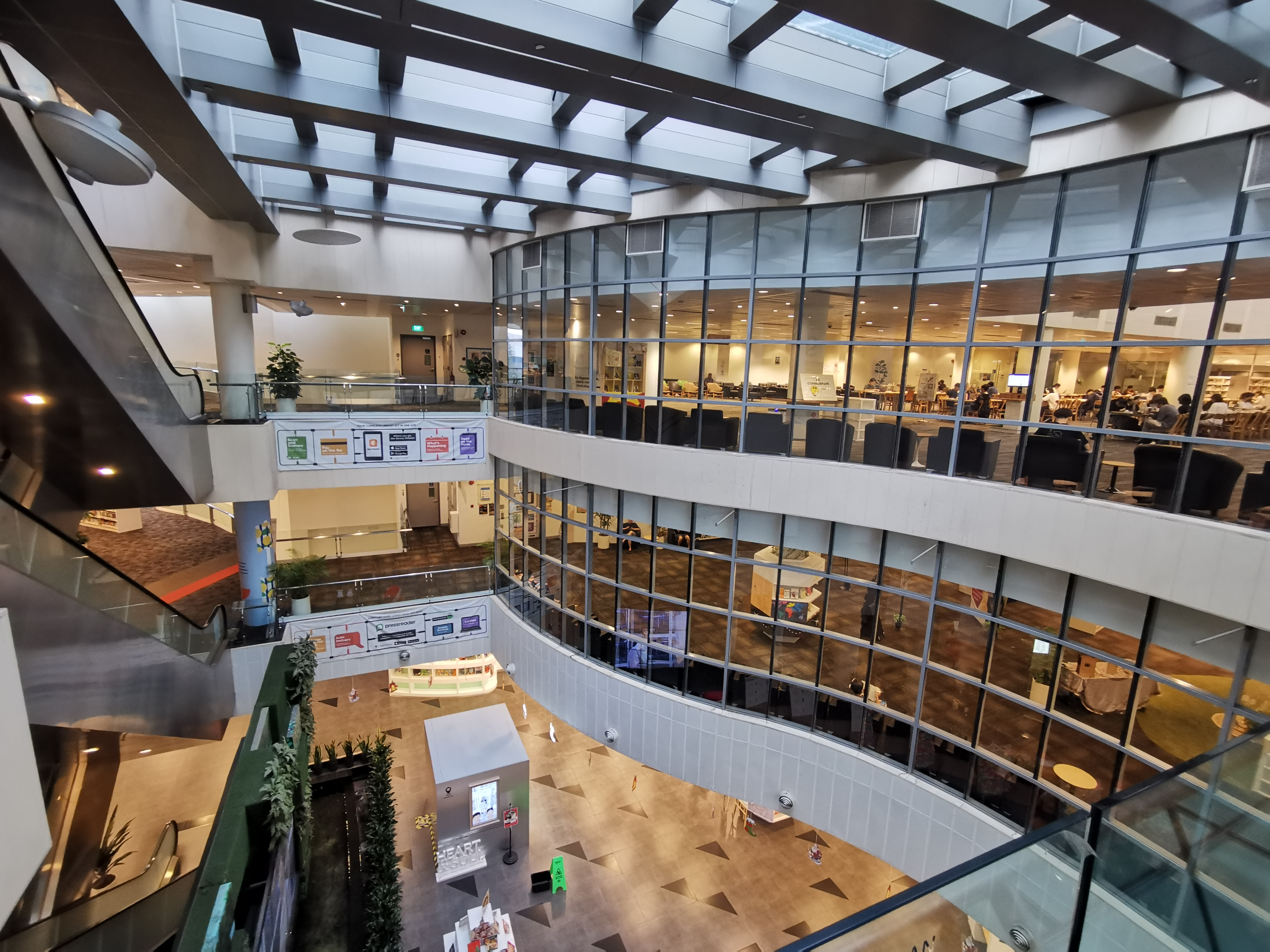
Interior

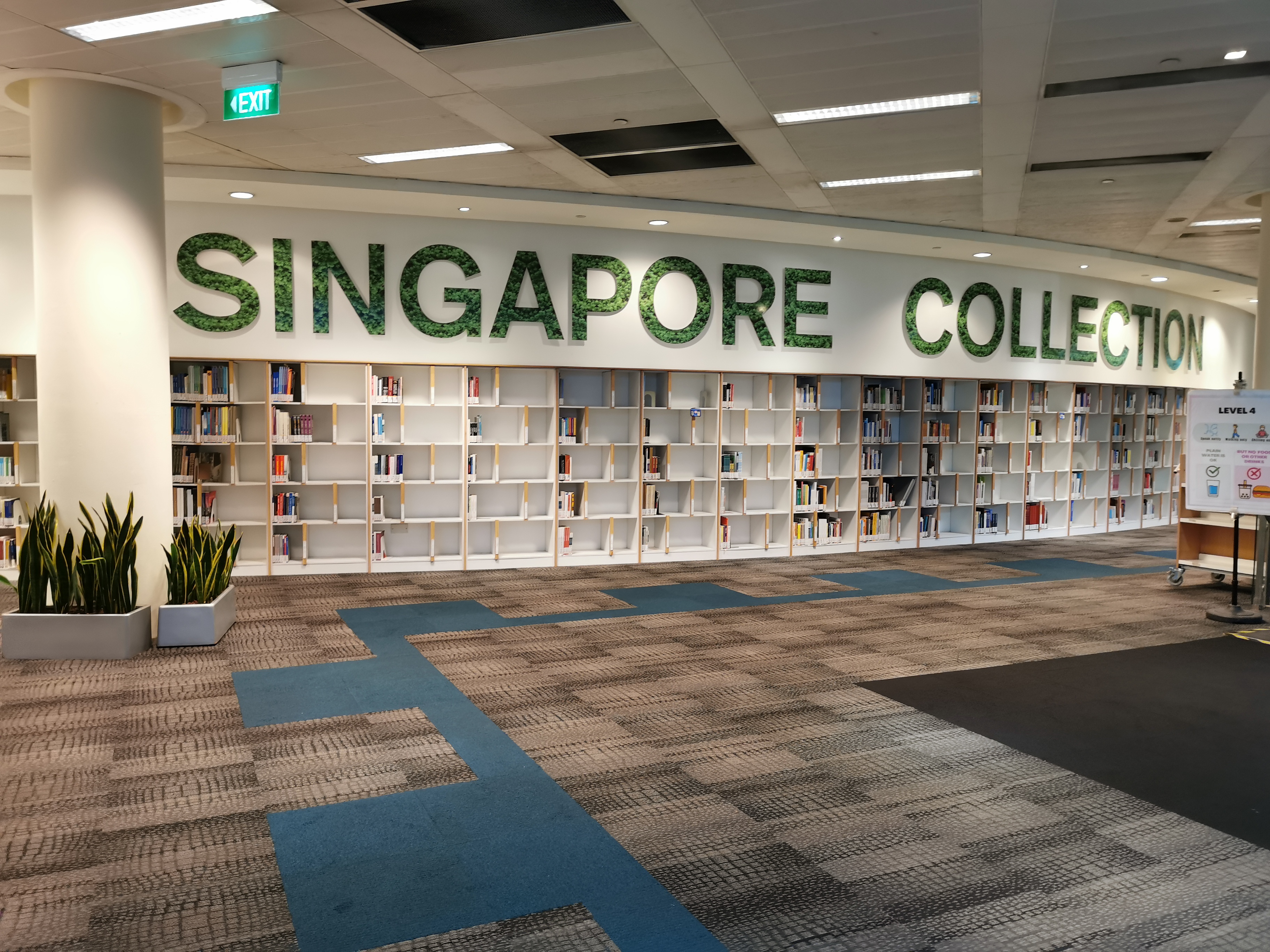
Singapore Collection (Level 3)

During the construction of the National Library building, it temporarily housed the main collections of the reference library until the opening of the new building on 22 July 2005.

== History ==
The library was first opened on 1 August 1988 as Jurong East Community Library by Ho Kah Leong who was the Senior Parliamentary Secretary (Communications & Information) and Member of Parliament for Jurong Constituency. It was subsequently closed in June 2003 for upgrading works. After the completion of its refurbishment in 2004, it was re-opened as Jurong Regional Library on 4 June that year by the then Acting Minister for Education, Tharman Shanmugaratnam.

=== Future relocation ===
The Urban Redevelopment Authority and National Library Board announced on 15 November 2022 that the library would be relocated to the future Jurong East Integrated Transport Hub in 2028.
