= Jurong East MRT station =

Mass Rapid Transit station in Singapore

Jurong East NS1 EW24 JE5 裕廊东 ஜூரோங் கிழக்கு
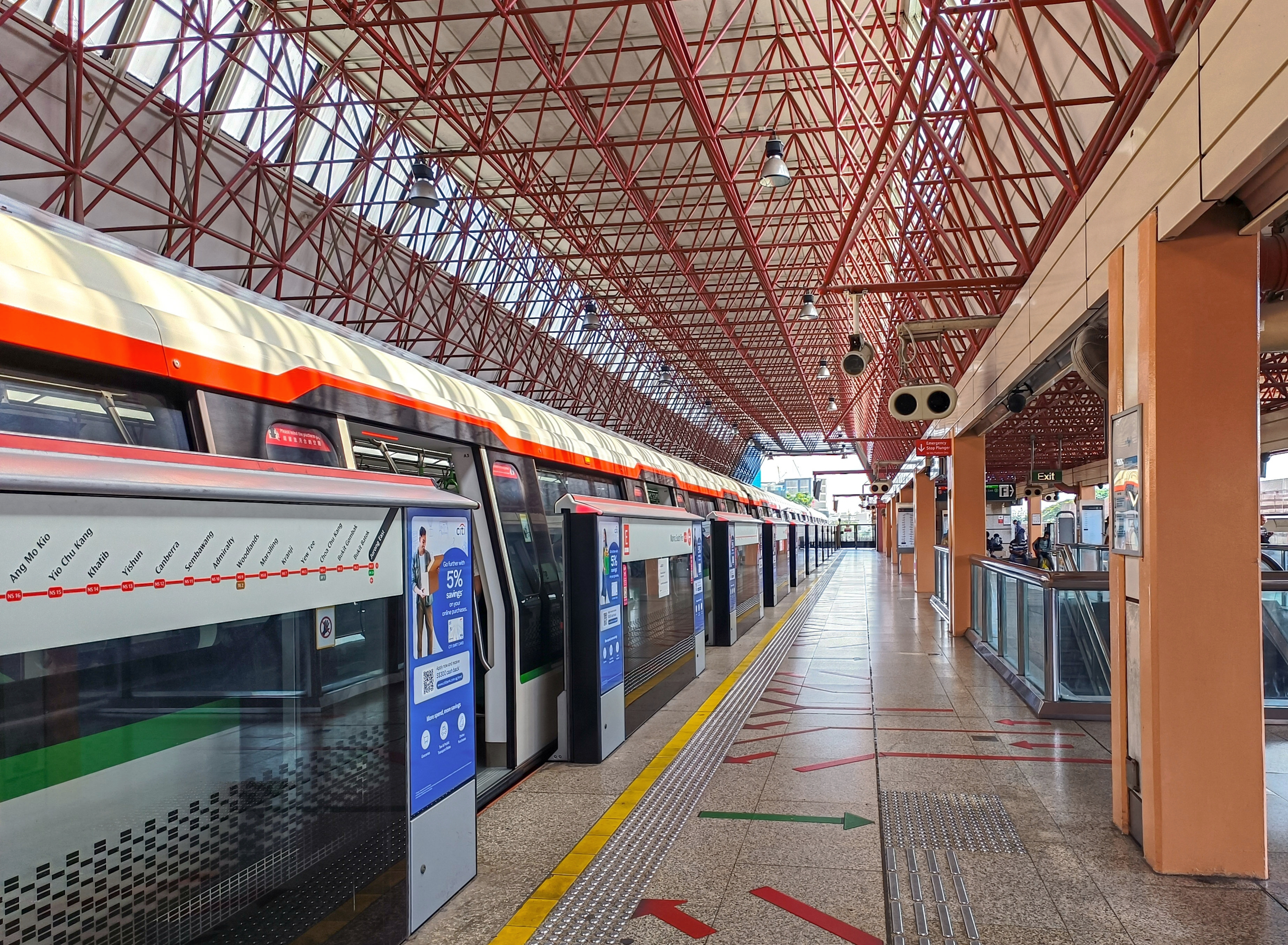
- Platform E of Jurong East

General information
- Location: 10 Jurong East Street 12, Singapore 609690
- Coordinates: 01°20′00″N 103°44′32″E
- System: Mass Rapid Transit (MRT) interchange and terminus
- Owner: Land Transport Authority
- Operator: SMRT Trains (North–South and East–West Lines); Singapore One Rail (Jurong Region Line)
- Line: North–South Line East–West Line Jurong Region Line
- Platforms: 6 (3 island platforms) + 2 (2 stacked platforms) (U/C)
- Tracks: 4 + 2 (U/C)
- Connections: Jurong East; Jurong Town Hall

Construction
- Structure type: Elevated
- Platform levels: 1 + 1 (U/C)
- Parking: Yes (Jem, Westgate)
- Cycle facilities: Yes
- Accessible: Yes

Other information
- Station code: JUR

History
- Opened: 5 November 1988; 37 years ago (Platforms C to F); 27 May 2011; 15 years ago (Platforms A & B)
- Opening: 2028; 2 years' time (Jurong Region Line)
- Former names: Jurong, Jurong Town

Passengers
- June 2024: 64,034 per day

Services
Preceding station	Mass Rapid Transit	Following station
Terminus	North–South Line	Bukit Batok towards Marina South Pier
Clementi towards Pasir Ris	East–West Line	Chinese Garden towards Tuas Link
Toh Guan towards Tengah	Jurong Region Line Future service	Jurong Town Hall towards Pandan Reservoir
Former services
Preceding station	Mass Rapid Transit	Following station
Terminus	Branch Line	Bukit Batok towards Choa Chu Kang
Track layout
Future layout
Location
- Location within Singapore Rail

Jurong East MRT station is an elevated Mass Rapid Transit (MRT) interchange station on the North–South (NSL) and East–West (EWL) lines in Jurong East, Singapore. Situated along Jurong Gateway Road, the station is located within the vicinity of Jem, Westgate, IMM, Ng Teng Fong General Hospital, Jurong East Bus Interchange and Jurong Town Hall Bus Interchange. The station is operated by SMRT Trains.

The station opened on 5 November 1988 as part of the MRT extension to Lakeside. The station was the terminus of the Branch line which later merged into the NSL. Through the Jurong East Modification Project, an additional track and platform were built in 2011 to improve train frequencies on the NSL. In May 2018, it was announced that the station would be an interchange with the Jurong Region Line (JRL) when the second stage opens in 2028. The station is planned to be integrated into the Jurong East Integrated Transport Hub (JEITH) – an integrated civic, retail and commercial complex.

== History ==
=== North–South and East–West lines ===
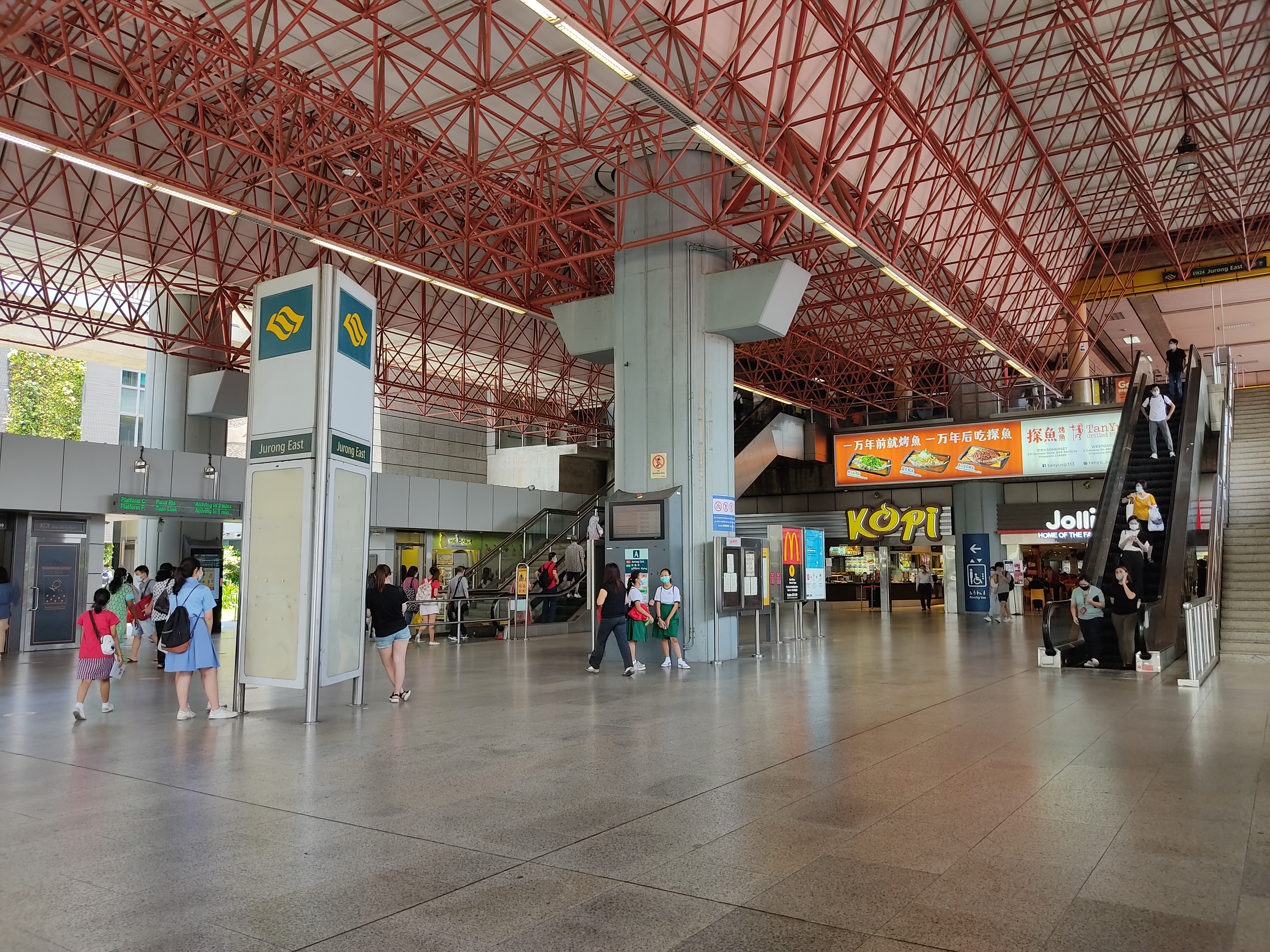
Exit A of Jurong East station in 2020

The station, initially named Jurong Town, was announced in October 1983 to be built as part of Phase II of the initial MRT system. Initially expected to be completed by 1992, the completion date of Phase II was pushed earlier to 1990. The station would be part of the Phase II MRT segment from Clementi to Lakeside.

The contract for the construction of Jurong station was awarded to a joint venture between Jurong Engineering and JDC Corporation in October 1985. The S$79.58 million contract (US$108 million in 2022) also included the construction of 3.2 kilometres (2.0 mi) of viaducts and the Ulu Pandan Depot. In November that year, the contract for the construction of viaducts from this station to Lakeside was awarded to a joint venture between Aoki Corporation and Lim Kah Ngam Construction for S$64.75 million (US$108 million in 2022). The contract included the construction of the Chinese Garden and Lakeside stations. In 1988, Communications Minister Yeo Ning Hong proposed allowing people to set up discos in the station to increase the station's vibrancy.

Jurong Town station was renamed to Jurong in September 1984, and to Jurong East in March 1987. As announced by MRT Corporation chairman Michael Fam on 10 March 1988, Jurong East station opened on 5 November that year. An opening ceremony was held at the station to inaugurate the 6.4-kilometre (4.0 mi) MRT extension to Lakeside station, attended by Yeo and Members of Parliament of the surrounding constituencies.

The station was the terminus for train services to Choa Chu Kang station when the Branch line opened on 10 March 1990. The Branch line was later incorporated into the North–South Line (NSL) with the Woodlands Extension on 10 February 1996.

=== Jurong East Modification Project and other upgrades ===
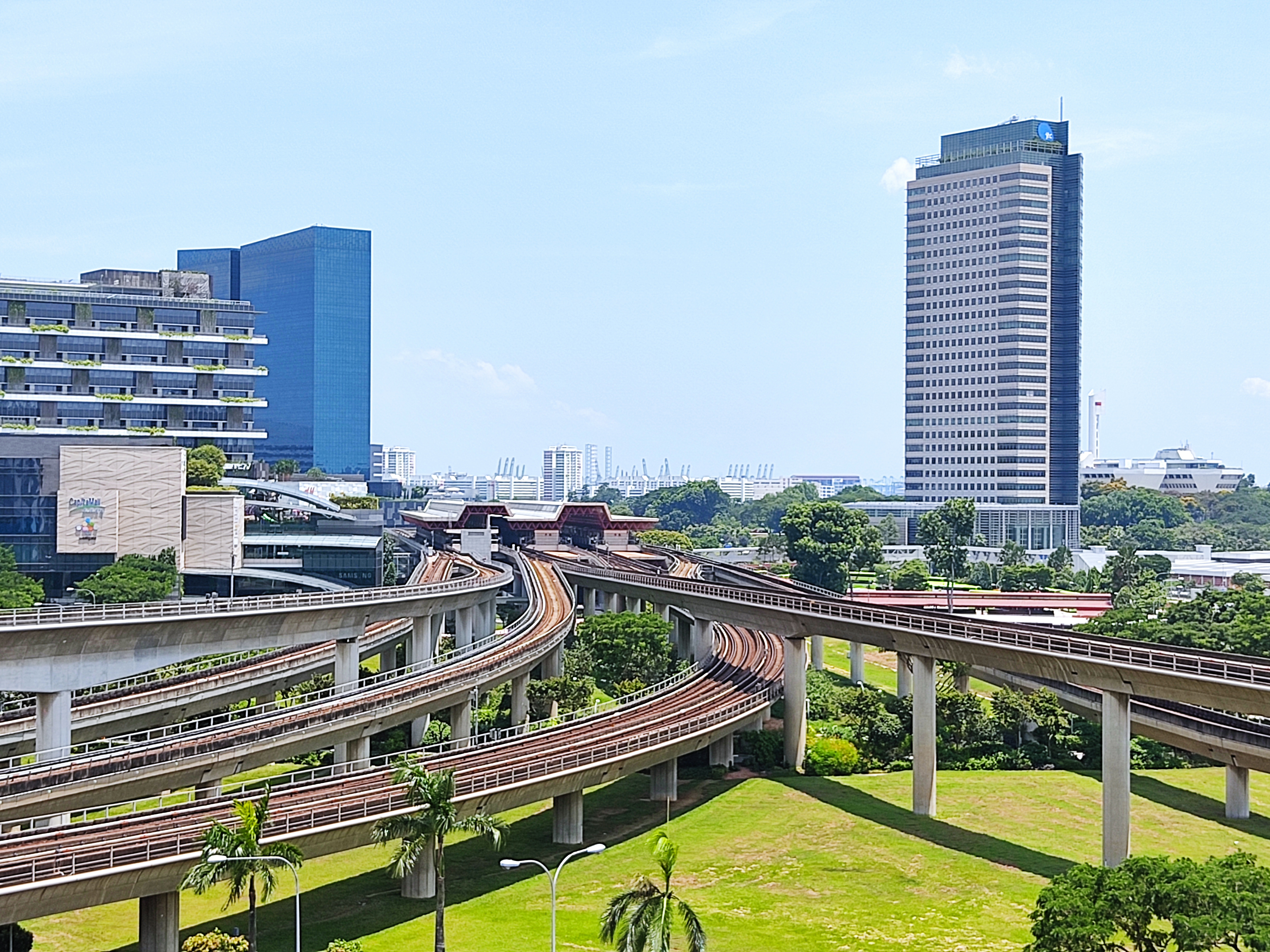
Exterior shot of Jurong East station in 2020, taken after the JEMP and prior to the JRL and the JEITH

In July 2008, the Land Transport Authority (LTA) announced the Jurong East Modification Project (JEMP), which involved the construction of a new platform and tracks to increase train frequency for the NSL. At the time, NSL trains could only terminate at the middle platform of the station. The contract for the construction of the new platform and viaducts was awarded to Sato Kagyo Pte Ltd in September 2008.

Originally projected to be completed in 2012, Transport Minister Raymond Lim announced on 12 February 2009 that the completion date of the JEMP was brought forward by a year to 2011. To facilitate turnout installation works, train services between Jurong East and Clementi were suspended from 4 to 5 September 2010 and subsequently between Jurong East and Bukit Batok from 18 to 19 September.

As announced on 16 May 2011, operations of the new platform commenced on 27 May that year. The new platform initially operated only during weekday morning peak hours, but from 27 December, it also began operating during weekday evening peak hours.

On 25 January 2008, Minister Lim announced the installation of half-height platform screen doors on elevated stations to improve safety on elevated stations. Jurong East station was among the first stations to have the screen doors installed as part of the pilot project carried out in 2009. High-volume low-speed fans were installed at the station between 2012 and 2013. Noise barriers were installed along the viaduct stretch from Jurong East Central to Jurong East Street 13 as part of a S$17 million (US$12.7 million) contract awarded to CKT Thomas Pte Ltd in January 2015. Another set of noise barriers from Boon Lay Way to Jurong East Avenue 1 were installed from 2018 to 2020.

As part of a joint emergency preparedness exercise by the LTA and train operator SMRT trains, security screenings were held at this station on 5 April 2019. Metal detectors and X-ray machines were deployed for the screening of commuters and their belongings during the exercise. Such exercises were conducted to test established response protocols and maintain vigilance for quicker and more effective responses during emergencies and heightened security situations. The exercise saw the first deployment of the Human Security Radar – a fully automatic walk-through system with the ability to screen through a crowd for suspicious items.

=== Jurong Region Line ===
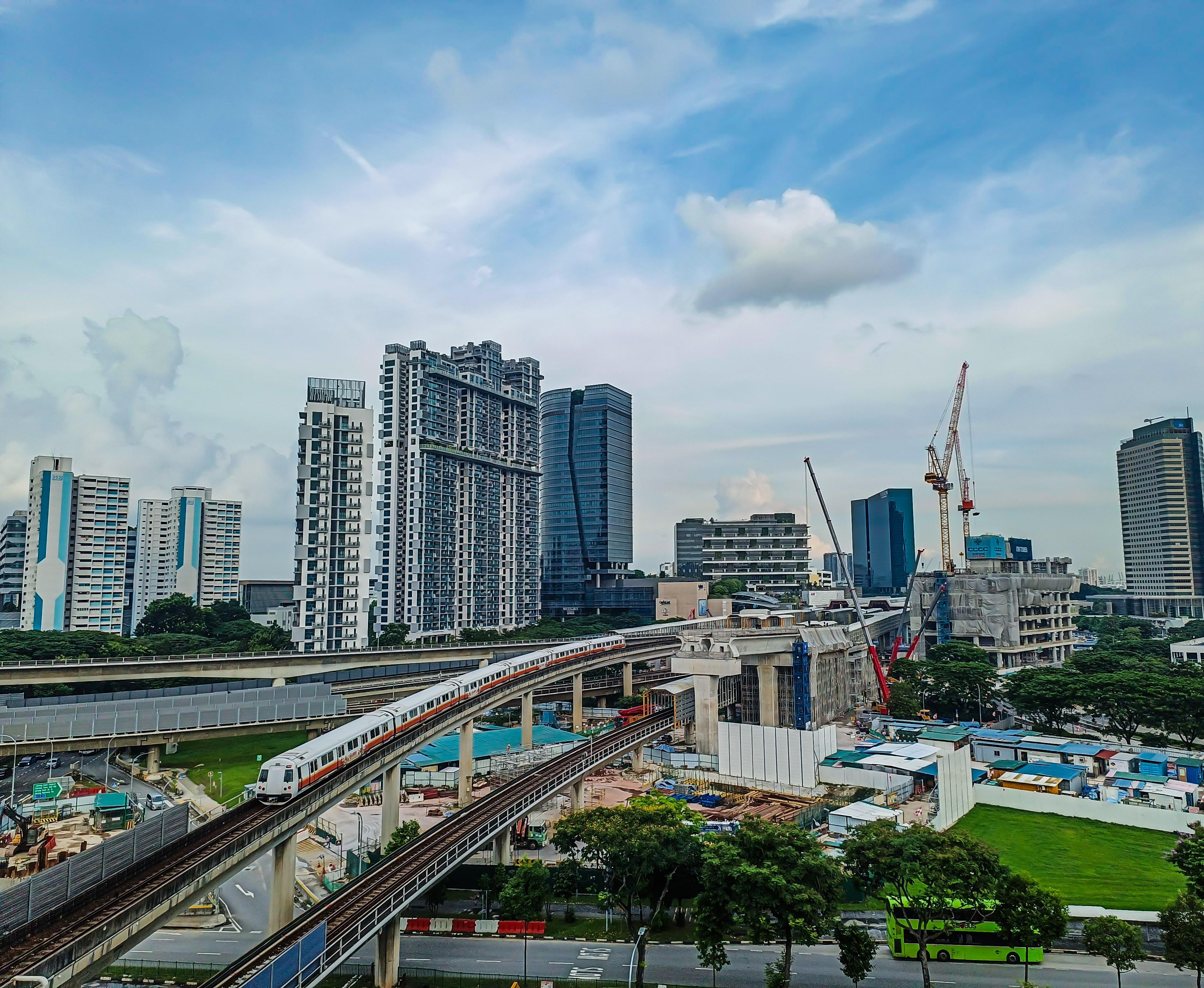
JRL viaducts and the JEITH under construction in 2024

As part of feasibility studies in the 1990s for building future LRT lines in Singapore, the LTA considered building an LRT system in the Jurong area. While the Jurong Region Line (JRL) was first announced on 23 October 2001, the project was put on hold. The JRL was included as part of the 2013 Land Transport Masterplan announced by transport minister Lui Tuck Yew in January that year.

On 9 May 2018, the LTA announced that Jurong East station would interchange with the proposed 24-kilometre (15 mi) JRL. The JRL station would be constructed as part of Phase 2 (JRL East), a branch line consisting of seven stations branching from Tengah to Pandan Reservoir. Phase 2 was expected to be completed in 2027. However, the restrictions on construction due to the COVID-19 pandemic have led to delays, with the completion date pushed to 2028.

The contract for the design and construction of Jurong East JRL station and associated viaducts was awarded to Daelim Industrial Co. Ltd for S$197.4 million (US$143.1 million) in February 2020. In addition, the contract for the construction of the Jurong East Integrated Transport Hub (JEITH) was awarded to China Communications Construction Company Limited (Singapore Branch) for S$447.4 million (US$333.9 million) in February 2021.

To facilitate the construction of the JRL station, the Jurong East Bus Interchange was relocated on 6 December 2020 to a new site along Jurong Gateway Road. A sheltered pedestrian bridge was built to connect the MRT station to the temporary bus interchange, which was to operate until the completion of the Jurong East Integrated Transport Hub in 2027. A temporary protection enclosure was installed over the NSL and EWL tracks to prevent debris from falling on the tracks during construction works. To control the movements of the MRT viaduct superstructure and transfer loads to the columns and piles, the existing bearings at the viaducts were replaced.

The Hub Plaza of Jurong East station had to be reconstructed. The escalator and staircase leading to the Hub Plaza were closed on 18 December 2022 with new temporary linkways constructed to connect to Exit A of the station. A defunct coin lift at platform E/F, which was used to transport coins for the old Transitlink ticketing system, had to be demolished for a new staircase. On 1 June 2025, a set of faregates was relocated closer to Exit B.

== Details ==
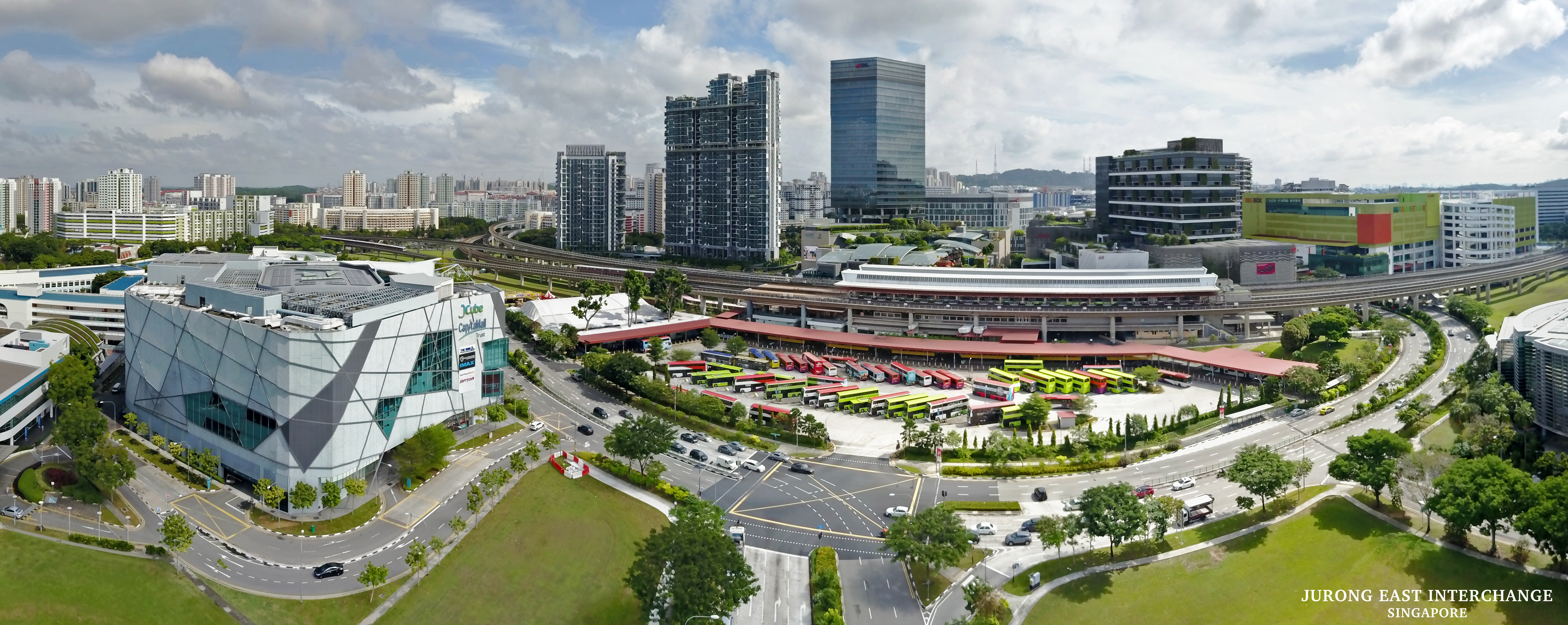
Aerial perspective of Jurong East station and surrounding landmarks in 2017

Jurong East station is an interchange station on the North–South (NSL) and East–West (EWL) lines. The station is the terminus of the NSL with the adjacent station being Bukit Batok station. On the EWL, the station is between the Clementi and Chinese Gardens stations. The official station code is NS1/EW24. When it opened, it had the station code of W9 before it was changed to its current station code in August 2001 as a part of a system-wide campaign to cater to the expanding MRT System. Being part of the NSL and EWL, the station is operated by SMRT Trains. Jurong East station is planned to be a future interchange with the JRL located between the Toh Guan and Jurong Town Hall stations.

The station is located along Jurong Gateway Road near the junction with Venture Avenue. Surrounding landmarks of the station include Jurong East Bus Interchange, Jem, Westgate, IMM, the JTC Summit, Ng Teng Fong General Hospital, CPF Jurong Building and Jurong Library, which are connected to the station via J-Walk, an elevated pedestrian network. Jurong East station is also near the Jurong Town Hall Bus Interchange. The station is planned to be integrated with the Jurong East Integrated Transport Hub, which will include the new offices of the Ministry of Transport and the LTA, community and civic institutions, an office tower and a bus interchange.

Jurong East station was designed by Scott Danielson of Parsons Brinckerhoff, who took inspiration from the adjacent Jurong East Bus Interchange and designed the space-frame roof of the station – a geometric pattern of cylindrical steel tubes connected by ball joints and topped with a flat lid. The new platform and tracks of the JEMP were integrated into the station design. Jurong East is a three-level station with three island platforms and four tracks. When the Jurong East Integrated Transport Hub designed by Aedas is completed, a 90 m (300 ft) link bridge over the tracks will connect the two buildings flanking the station. The JRL station will have a stacked platform configuration.

As part of SMRT's heritage-themed artwork showcase Comic Connect, the station features A Journey Through Jurong East by students from the School of the Arts. The mural showcases the Jurong Bird Park, Jurong Town hall, Jurong River, and the Jurong Drive-in Cinema. In order to create the mural, the students researched the area's history, ecology, and culture.
