= Westgate, Singapore =

Shopping mall in Jurong East, Singapore

Westgate
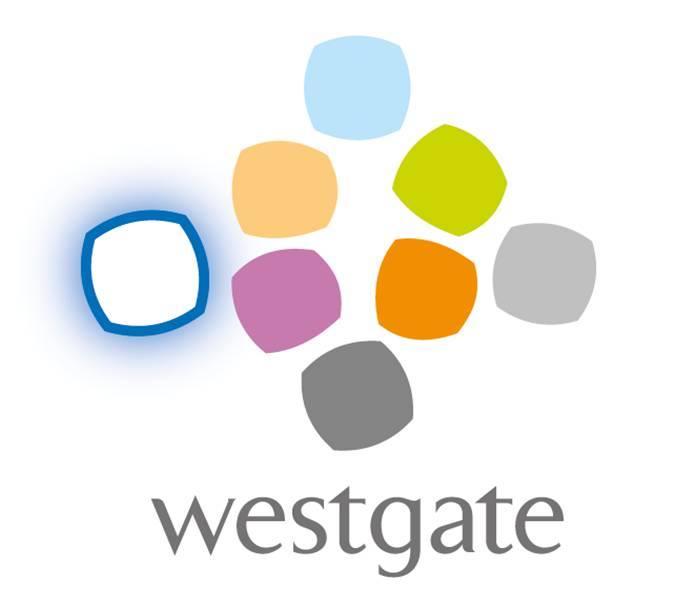
- The logo of Westgate Singapore
- Location: Jurong East, Singapore
- Coordinates: 1.3341°N 103.7428°E
- Address: 3 Gateway Drive, Singapore 608532
- Opened: 2 December 2013; 12 years ago
- Manager: CapitaMalls Asia
- Owner: CapitaMalls Asia
- Num. of stores: 196
- Num. of anchor tenants: 24
- Floor area: 410,000 square feet (38,000 m^{2})
- Floors: 7
- Parking: About 600
- Public transit: EW24 NS1 JE5 Jurong East
- Website: westgate.com.sg/en

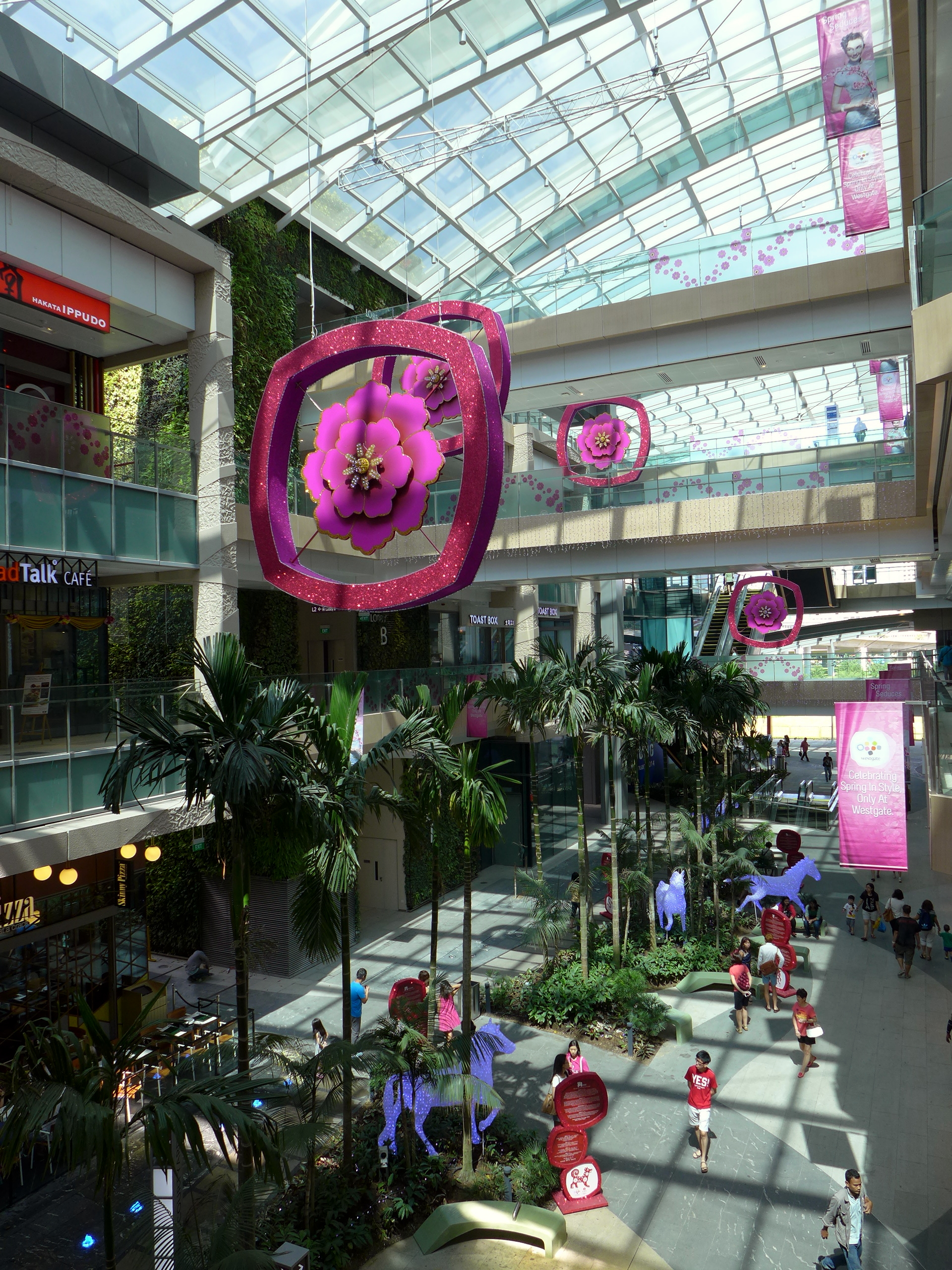
Westgate (Singapore) Atrium

Westgate is a lifestyle and family shopping mall in Jurong East, Singapore. It is located close to Jurong East MRT station and Jurong East Bus Interchange. It is also connected with another shopping mall called Jem, and the Ng Teng Fong General Hospital.

== Background ==
Located at the heart of Jurong Gateway, the integrated retail and office development compromises of a 7-level lifestyle and family shopping mall and a 20-level office tower known as Westgate Tower.

An Isetan Supermarket was located at Basement 2, the lowest level in Westgate. It closed on 8 March 2020. There is also the Westgate Wonderland on Level 4 that consists of a gym, Fitness First, a swimming pool and a childcare centre called Kids Club at Level 5.

On 23 May 2021, the mall, along with neighboring Jem was closed for 2 weeks to 5 June due to COVID-19 after it was discovered that a cluster had emerged in those malls.
