= Jurong Town Hall Bus Interchange =

Bus Interchange in Jurong East

Coordinates: 1.3300°N 103.7434°E

Jurong Town Hall Bus Interchange 裕廊镇大会堂巴士转换站 Pusat Pertukaran Bas Dewan Perbandaran Jurong
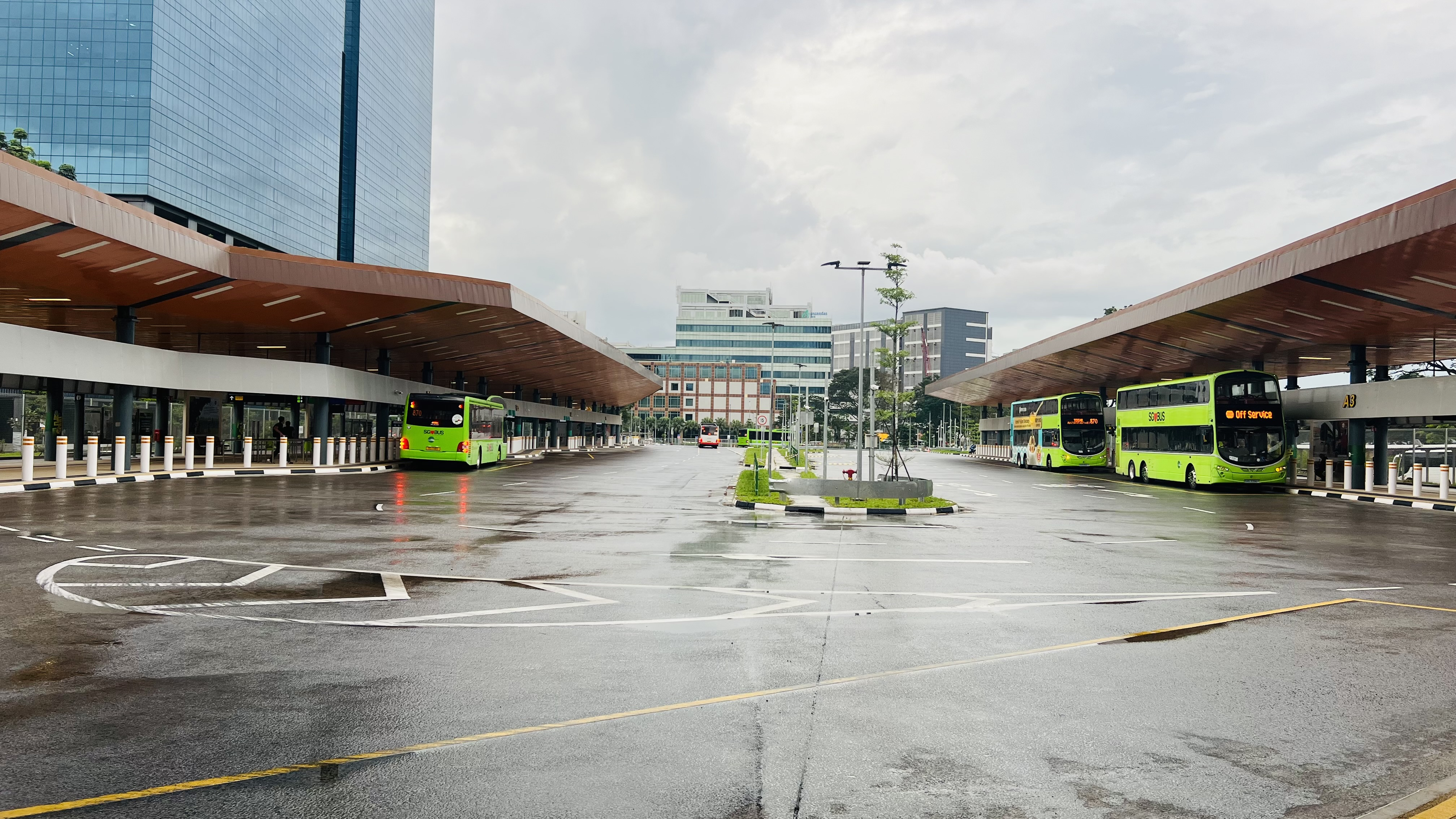
- Jurong Town Hall Bus Interchange.

General information
- Location: 1A Venture Drive, Singapore 609770
- System: Public Bus Interchange
- Owner: Land Transport Authority
- Operator: Tower Transit Singapore Pte Ltd (Transit Systems)
- Bus routes: 3 (Tower Transit); 1 (SBS Transit); 3 (Causeway Link)
- Bus stands: 5 Sawtooth Berths
- Bus operators: Tower Transit Singapore Pte Ltd; SBS Transit Ltd; Causeway Link
- Connections: NS1 EW24 JE5 Jurong East; JE6 Jurong Town Hall U/C

Construction
- Structure type: At-grade
- Accessible: Accessible alighting/boarding points Accessible public toilets Graduated kerb edges Tactile guidance system

History
- Opened: 26 November 2023; 2 years ago

Key dates
- 26 November 2023: Commenced operations
Location

Jurong Town Hall Bus Interchange is a bus interchange located in Jurong East, Singapore. Operated by Tower Transit, the bus interchange is located along Venture Drive, adjacent to Vision Exchange, The JTC Summit, Jurong Town Hall, and within walking distance of Jurong East MRT station and International Business Park. Opened in 2023 to supplement the Jurong East Bus Interchange, the main bus station in Jurong East, Jurong Town Hall interchange also functions as a hub for cross-border bus services to Johor, Malaysia from Jurong East, which previously called at the main Jurong East interchange.

== Bus contracting model ==
Under the bus contracting model, all bus services operating from Jurong Town Hall Bus Interchange were divided into two bus packages, operated by two bus operators.

=== List of bus services ===
Operator	Package	Service	Berth	Destination	Remarks
Causeway Link	NIL	CW3	B5	Perling Mall	Cross Border Service (via Second Link)
Causeway Link	NIL	CW4	B5	Pontian	Cross Border Service (via Second Link)
Causeway Link	NIL	CW4S	B5	CIQ Second Link	Cross Border Service (via Second Link)
SBS Transit	Bukit Merah	160	B3	↺ JB Sentral	Cross Border Service (via Causeway)
SBS Transit	Bukit Merah	160A	B3	Bukit Batok Road (Opp Dunearn Sec Sch)	Short Trip Service
Tower Transit Singapore	Bulim	78	B1	↺ Clementi Avenue 3	—N/a
Tower Transit Singapore	Bulim	78A	B1	Tanjong Penjuru (Opp CLP Intl)	Short Trip Service
Tower Transit Singapore	Bulim	79	B3	↺ Boon Lay	—N/a
Tower Transit Singapore	Bulim	79T	B3	Boon Lay Interchange	Terminating Trip
Tower Transit Singapore	Bulim	870	B2	Tengah	—N/a
Tower Transit Singapore	Bulim	984	B2	Woodlands Road (Opp Blk 635A)	—N/a
