= Jurong (disambiguation) =

Jurong is a geographical region in south-western Singapore.

- Jurong East (disambiguation)
  - Jurong East, a new town in the eastern Jurong
- Jurong West, a new town in the western Jurong
- Jurong Group Representation Constituency, the constituency that currently governs Jurong East
- Jurong Single Member Constituency, a defunct constituency that governed parts of Jurong

Jurong may also refer to:

- Jurong, Jiangsu, a city in Jiangsu, China
- MV Jurong, a scrapped Singaporean coaster named after the Jurong region
