= Choa Chu Kang West MRT station =

Future Mass Rapid Transit station in Singapore

Choa Chu Kang West JS2 蔡厝港西 சுவா சூ காங் வெஸ்ட்
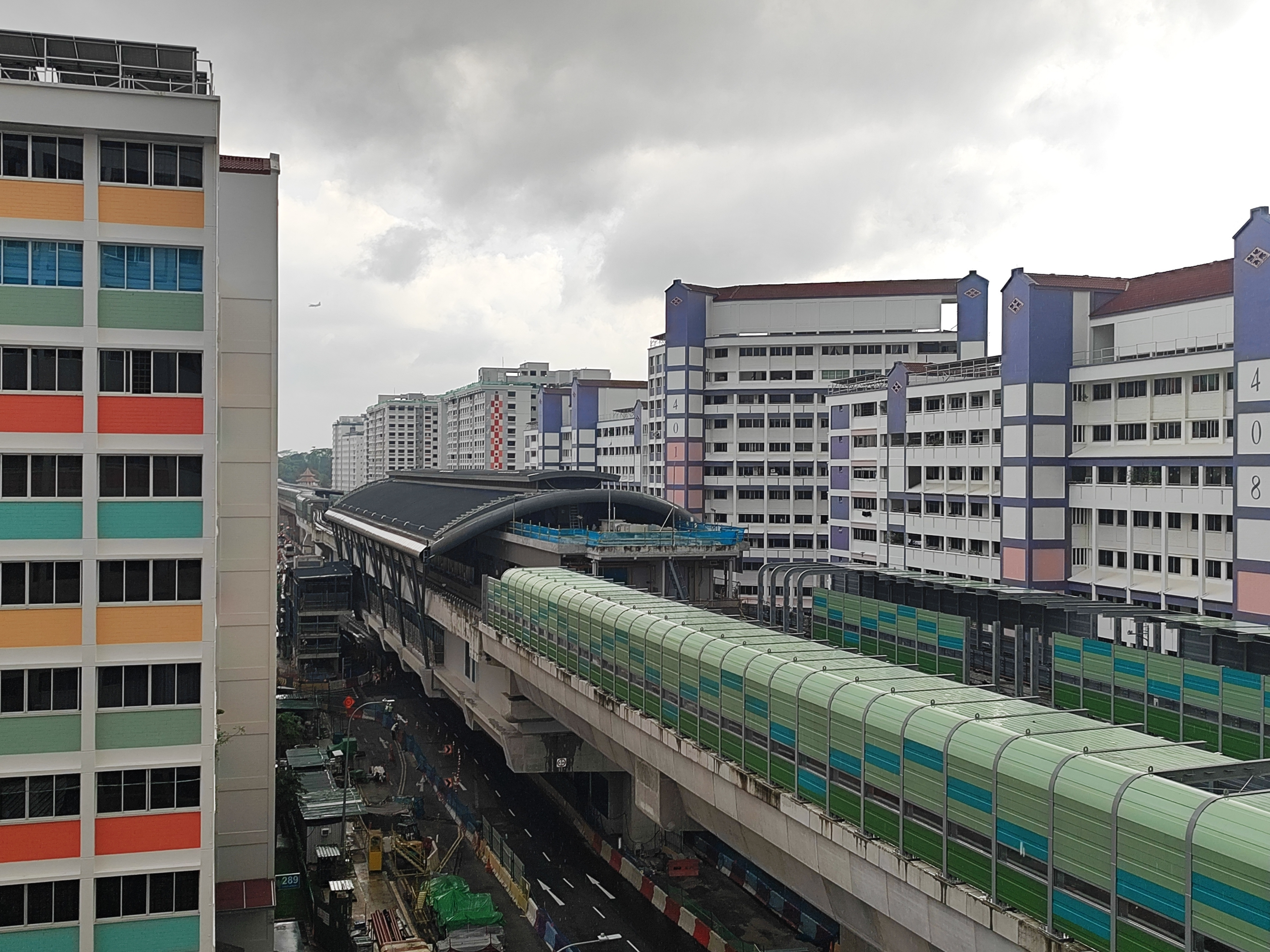
- Choa Chu Kang West MRT station site in 2026

General information
- Location: 61 Choa Chu Kang Avenue 3, Singapore 689979
- Coordinates: 01°22′44″N 103°44′22″E
- System: Future Mass Rapid Transit (MRT) station
- Owner: Land Transport Authority
- Operator: Singapore One Rail
- Line: Jurong Region Line
- Platforms: 2 (1 island platform)
- Tracks: 2
- Connections: Bus, Taxi

Construction
- Structure type: Elevated
- Platform levels: 1
- Cycle facilities: Yes
- Accessible: Yes

Other information
- Station code: CCW

History
- Opening: mid-2028; 2 years' time

Services
| Preceding station | Mass Rapid Transit | Following station |
|---|---|---|
| Choa Chu Kang Terminus | Jurong Region Line Future service | Tengah towards Boon Lay |
| Choa Chu Kang Terminus | Jurong Region Line Future service | JS2A towards Boon Lay |
Track layout
Location
- Location within Singapore Rail

Choa Chu Kang West MRT station is a future elevated Mass Rapid Transit (MRT) station on the Jurong Region Line (JRL) Phase 1 in Choa Chu Kang, Singapore. It is built along Choa Chu Kang Avenue 3, near the junction with Choa Chu Kang Avenue 1, bringing rail connectivity to schools, residential developments and community amenities in the area.

The station is in the vicinity of schools such as Choa Chu Kang Primary School, Concord Primary School and Bukit Panjang Government High School; community amenities such as Sunshine Place, Victory Family Centre and Bethany Methodist Nursing Home; and residential developments around Choa Chu Kang Avenues 2, 3, 4 and 5.

The station is targeted for opening in mid-2028. Originally planned to open in 2026, it was delayed due to the COVID-19 pandemic. It was further delayed from 2027 due to construction and testing delays.

== History ==
On 9 May 2018, LTA announced that Choa Chu Kang West station would be part of the proposed Jurong Region Line (JRL). The station will be constructed as part of Phase 1, JRL (West), consisting of 10 stations between Choa Chu Kang, Boon Lay and Tawas, and is expected to be completed in 2027. Initially expected to open in 2026, the restrictions on the construction due to the COVID-19 pandemic has led to delays in the JRL line completion, and the date was pushed to 2027. Due to construction and testing delays, the completion date was further delayed to mid-2028.

As the road median along Choa Chu Kang Avenue 3 is rather narrow, it can be expected that the carriageways will be pushed further out once construction begins. This would allow the viaduct to keep to the middle of the roadway, allowing for ample space from the residential blocks. To keep noise levels to a minimum, full height noise enclosures may be deployed.

Contract J102 for the design and construction of Choa Chu Kang West Station and associated viaducts was awarded to Shanghai Tunnel Engineering Co. (Singapore) Pte Ltd at a sum of S$465.2 million (US$337.6 million in 2024). Aurecon has been appointed lead consultant to Shanghai Tunnel Engineering Co (Singapore) Pte Ltd (STEC). Construction started in 2020, with completion expected in mid-2028. The contract also includes the design and construction of Choa Chu Kang station and Tengah station, and associated viaducts and A&A works to the existing Choa Chu Kang station complex.

== Location ==
The station will be straddled over the existing Choa Chu Kang Avenue 3, just east of the junction with Choa Chu Kang Avenue 1. It is located within the Choa Chu Kang planning area between the Keat Hong and Peng Siang subzones, nested within an existing housing estate, near to Sunshine Place.

Access to the station will be via 2 exits from ground level, 1 on each side of Choa Chu Kang Avenue 3.
