= Pandan Reservoir MRT station =

Future Mass Rapid Transit station in Singapore

Pandan Reservoir JE7 班丹蓄水池 பாண்டன் ரெசவோர்
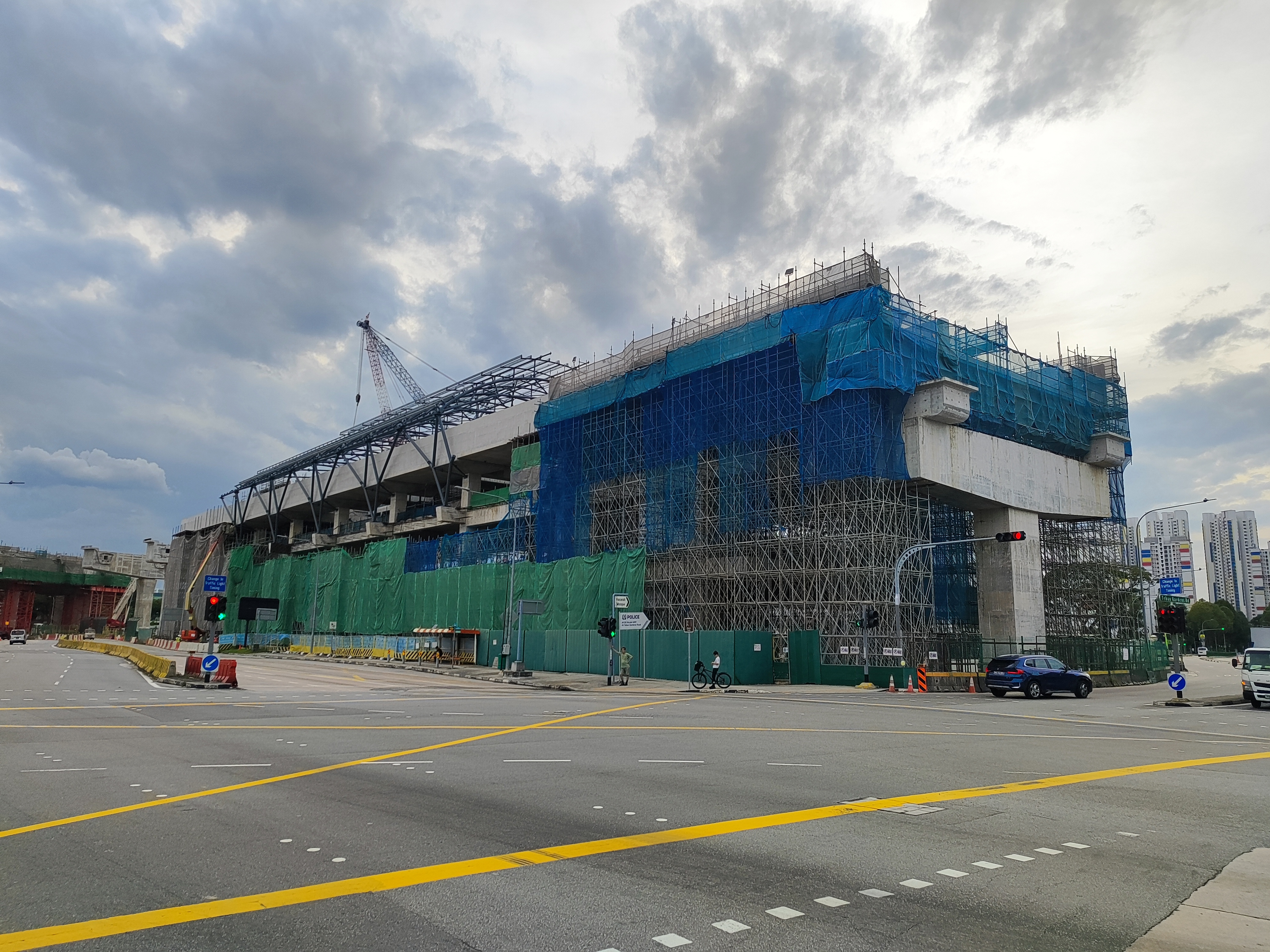
- Pandan Reservoir MRT station site in January 2026

General information
- Coordinates: 01°19′12″N 103°44′42″E
- System: Future Mass Rapid Transit (MRT) station
- Owner: Land Transport Authority
- Operator: Singapore One Rail
- Line: Jurong Region Line
- Platforms: 2 (1 island platform)
- Tracks: 2
- Connections: Bus, Taxi

Construction
- Structure type: Elevated
- Platform levels: 1
- Parking: Yes
- Cycle facilities: Yes
- Accessible: Yes

Other information
- Station code: PDR

History
- Opening: 2028; 2 years' time

Services
Preceding station	Mass Rapid Transit	Following station
Jurong Town Hall towards Tengah	Jurong Region Line Future service	Terminus
Jurong Town Hall towards Tengah	Jurong Region Line Future service	West Coast Terminus
Location
- Location within Singapore Rail

Pandan Reservoir MRT station is a future elevated Mass Rapid Transit (MRT) station on the Jurong Region Line in Jurong East, Singapore.

It will be the southern terminus of the East Branch of the Jurong Region Line. Trains entering service at this station will terminate at Tengah. With the West Coast Extension, the station will eventually be extended to West Coast and Kent Ridge MRT stations by the 2030s and 2040s respectively. However, it is currently unknown whether there will be any additional stations between West Coast and Kent Ridge.

== History ==
On 9 May 2018, LTA announced that Pandan Reservoir station would be part of the proposed Jurong Region Line (JRL). The station will be constructed as part of Phase 2, JRL (East), consisting of 7 stations between Tengah and Pandan Reservoir, and is expected to be completed in 2028.

Contract J109 for the design and construction of Pandan Reservoir station and associated viaducts was awarded to Daewoo Engineering & Construction Co. Pte Ltd - Yongnam Engineering and Construction Pte Ltd Joint Venture at a sum of S$320.4 million in July 2020. Construction is expected to start in 2020. Contract J109 also includes the design and construction of the Jurong Town Hall and Toh Guan stations and the 3.6-kilometre (2.2-mile) associated viaducts.

Initially expected to open in 2027, the restrictions on the construction due to the COVID-19 pandemic has led to delays in the JRL line completion, and the date was pushed to 2028.

== Location ==
The station complex will be situated along Jurong Town Hall Road, next to the junction with Pandan Gardens and Teban Gardens Road. It is located in the Jurong East planning area in the Teban Gardens subzone, opposite of Commonwealth Secondary School.

Access to the station will be via 5 exits total, located on either side of Jurong Town Hall Road.
