= Tengah MRT station =

Future Mass Rapid Transit station in Singapore

Tengah JS3 登加 தெங்கா
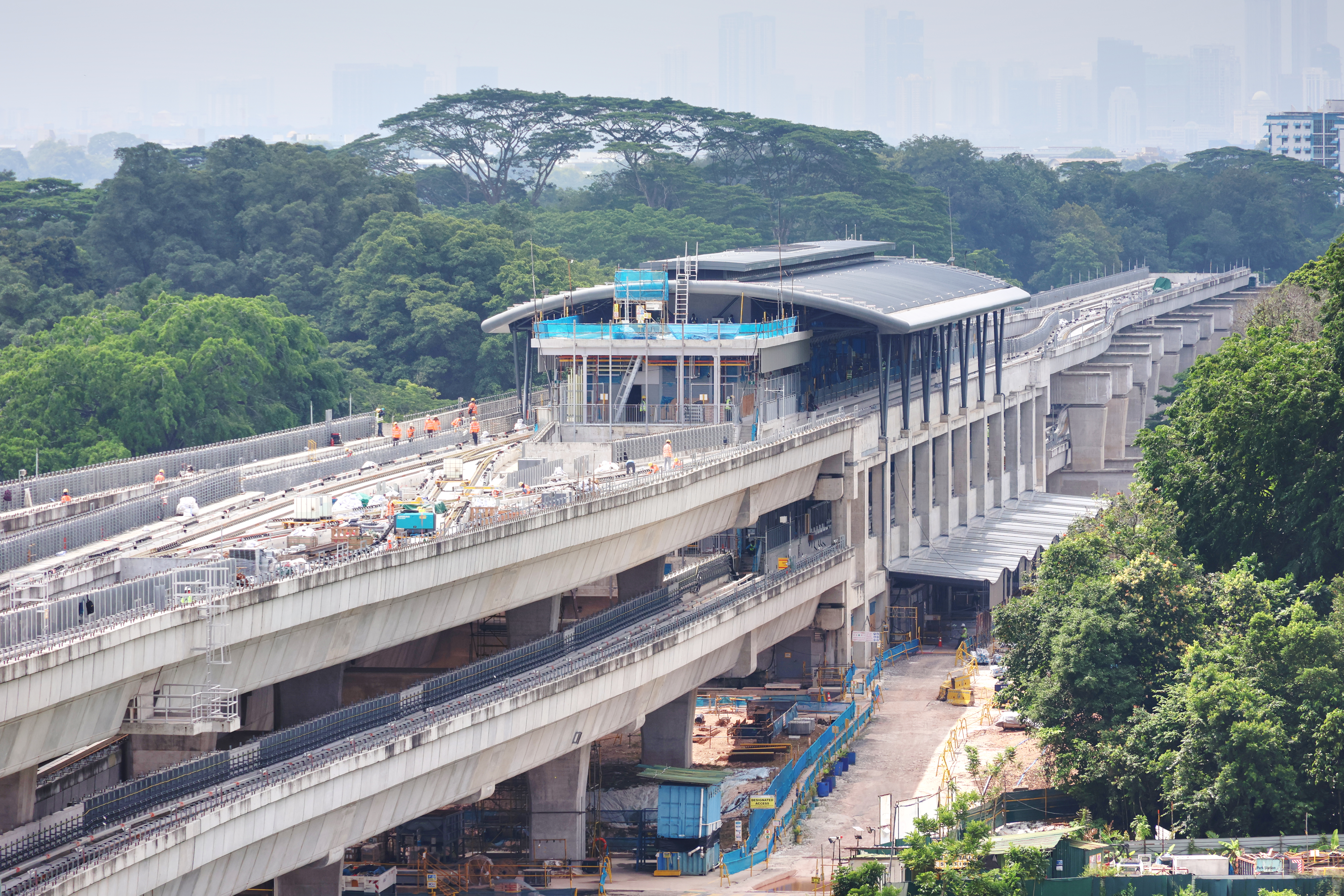
- Tengah MRT station site

General information
- Location: 51 Tengah Central, Singapore 699879
- Coordinates: 01°21′59″N 103°43′48″E
- System: Future Mass Rapid Transit (MRT) interchange and terminus
- Owner: Land Transport Authority
- Operator: Singapore One Rail
- Line: Jurong Region Line
- Platforms: 4 (2 island platforms)
- Tracks: 5 (Including one reception track to/from Tengah depot)
- Connections: Bus, Taxi

Construction
- Structure type: Elevated
- Platform levels: 2
- Cycle facilities: Yes
- Accessible: Yes

Other information
- Station code: TGH

History
- Opening: mid-2028; 2 years' time

Services
Preceding station	Mass Rapid Transit	Following station
Choa Chu Kang West towards Choa Chu Kang	Jurong Region Line Future service	Hong Kah towards Boon Lay
JS2A towards Choa Chu Kang	Jurong Region Line Future service	Hong Kah towards Boon Lay
Terminus	Jurong Region Line Future service	Tengah Plantation towards Pandan Reservoir
Track layout
Location
- Location within Singapore Rail

Tengah MRT station is a future elevated Mass Rapid Transit (MRT) station on the Jurong Region Line in Tengah, Singapore.

It will be the northern terminus of the East Branch of the Jurong Region Line, allowing passengers on the East Branch to change trains for Main Branch train services. Trains entering service at this station will terminate at Pandan Reservoir.

== History ==
On 9 May 2018, the Land Transport Authority (LTA) announced that Tengah station would be part of the proposed Jurong Region Line (JRL). The station will be constructed as part of Phase 1, JRL (West), consisting of 10 stations between Choa Chu Kang, Boon Lay and Tawas, and is expected to be completed in mid-2028.

Contract J102 for the design and construction of Tengah Station and associated viaducts was awarded to Shanghai Tunnel Engineering Co. (Singapore) Pte Ltd at a sum of S$465.2 million (US$337.6 million in 2024). Construction will start in 2020, with completion in mid-2028. The contract also includes the design and construction of Choa Chu Kang station and Choa Chu Kang West station, and associated viaducts and A&A works to the existing Choa Chu Kang station complex.

Initially expected to open in 2026, restrictions due to the COVID-19 pandemic delayed the completion of Phase 1, including Tengah station, to 2027. Due to construction and testing delays, the completion date was further delayed to mid-2028.

== Location ==
The station will be co-located with Tengah Mall and Tengah Bus Interchange (Integrated Transport Hub), one of the basic necessities for Tengah to thrive as a new town.
