= Jurong East Bus Interchange =

Bus interchange in Singapore

Jurong East Bus Interchange 裕廊东巴士转换站 Pusat Pertukaran Bas Jurong East
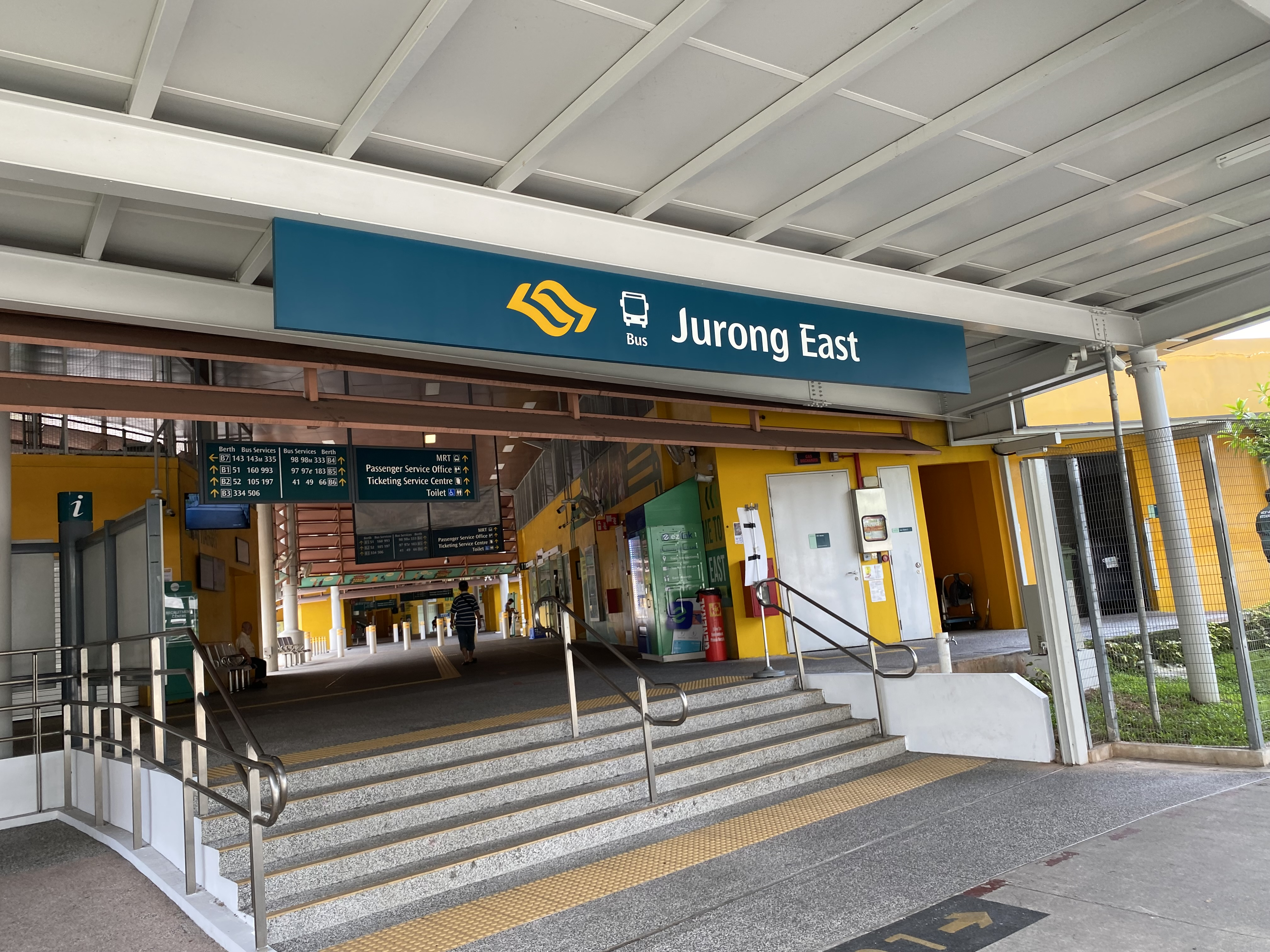
- Entrance of Jurong East Bus Interchange.

General information
- Location: 17A Jurong Gateway Road, Singapore 608513
- Coordinates: 1°20′6″N 103°44′31″E
- System: Public Bus Interchange
- Owner: Land Transport Authority
- Operator: Tower Transit Singapore
- Bus routes: 12 (Tower Transit); 6 (SBS Transit)
- Bus stands: 7 sawtooth boarding berths 4 linear alighting berths
- Bus operators: Tower Transit Singapore; SBS Transit
- Connections: NS1 EW24 JE5 Jurong East

Construction
- Structure type: At-grade
- Accessible: Accessible alighting/boarding points Accessible public toilets Graduated kerb edges Tactile guidance system

History
- Opened: 30 June 1985; 41 years ago (Original); 17 December 2011; 14 years ago (Temporary); 6 December 2020; 5 years ago (Interim)
- Closed: 16 December 2011; 14 years ago (Original); 5 December 2020; 5 years ago (Temporary)

Key dates
- 30 June 1985: Commenced operations
- 17 December 2011: Operations transferred to temporary bus interchange
- 6 December 2020: Operations transferred to interim bus interchange due to construction of Jurong Region MRT line and new integrated transport hub
Location

Jurong East Bus Interchange is a bus interchange located in Jurong East, Singapore. An open-air single-level bus terminal, it is connected to the adjacent Jurong East MRT station via a link bridge.

== History ==
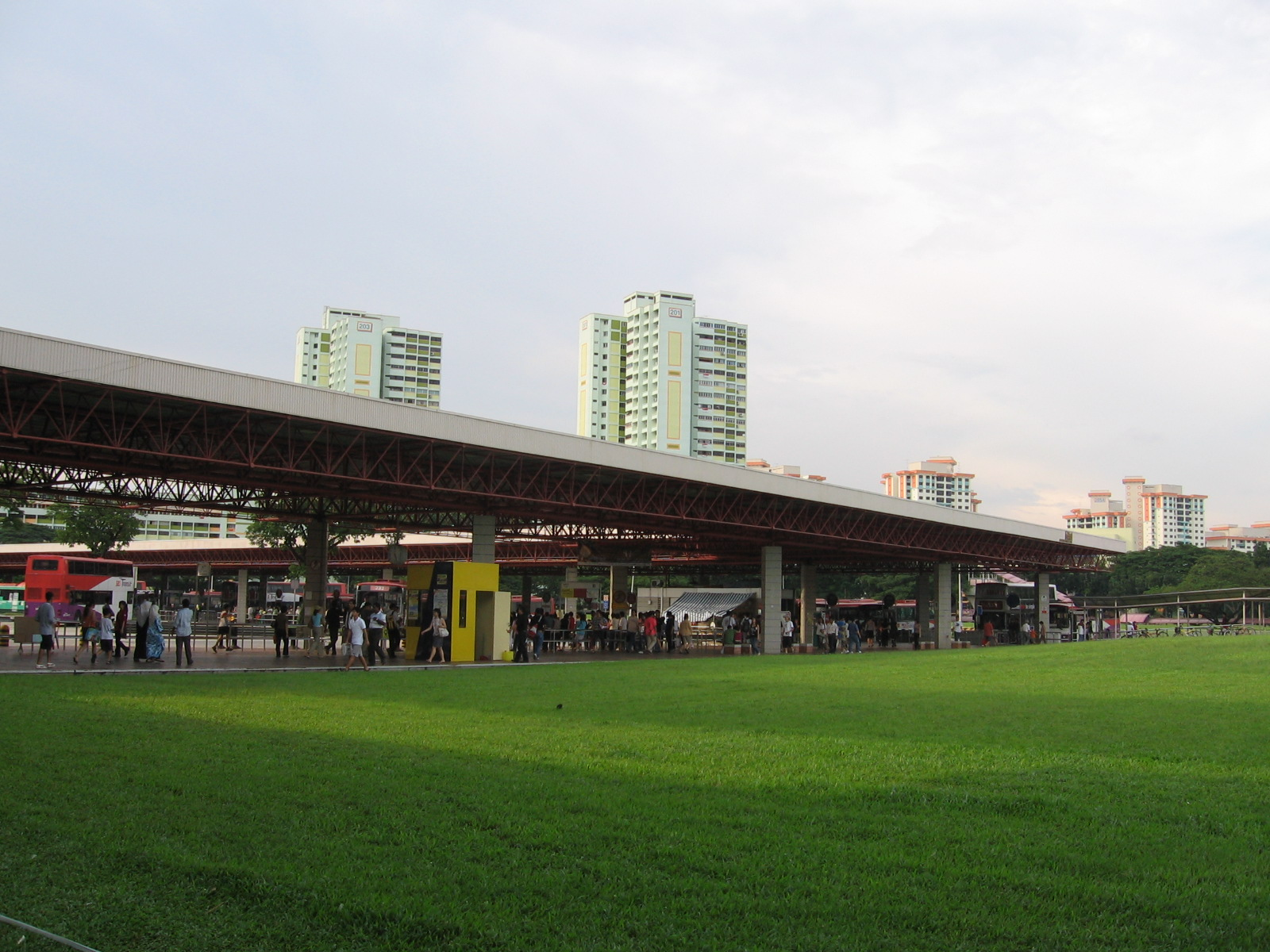
Eastern end of the original Jurong East Bus Interchange

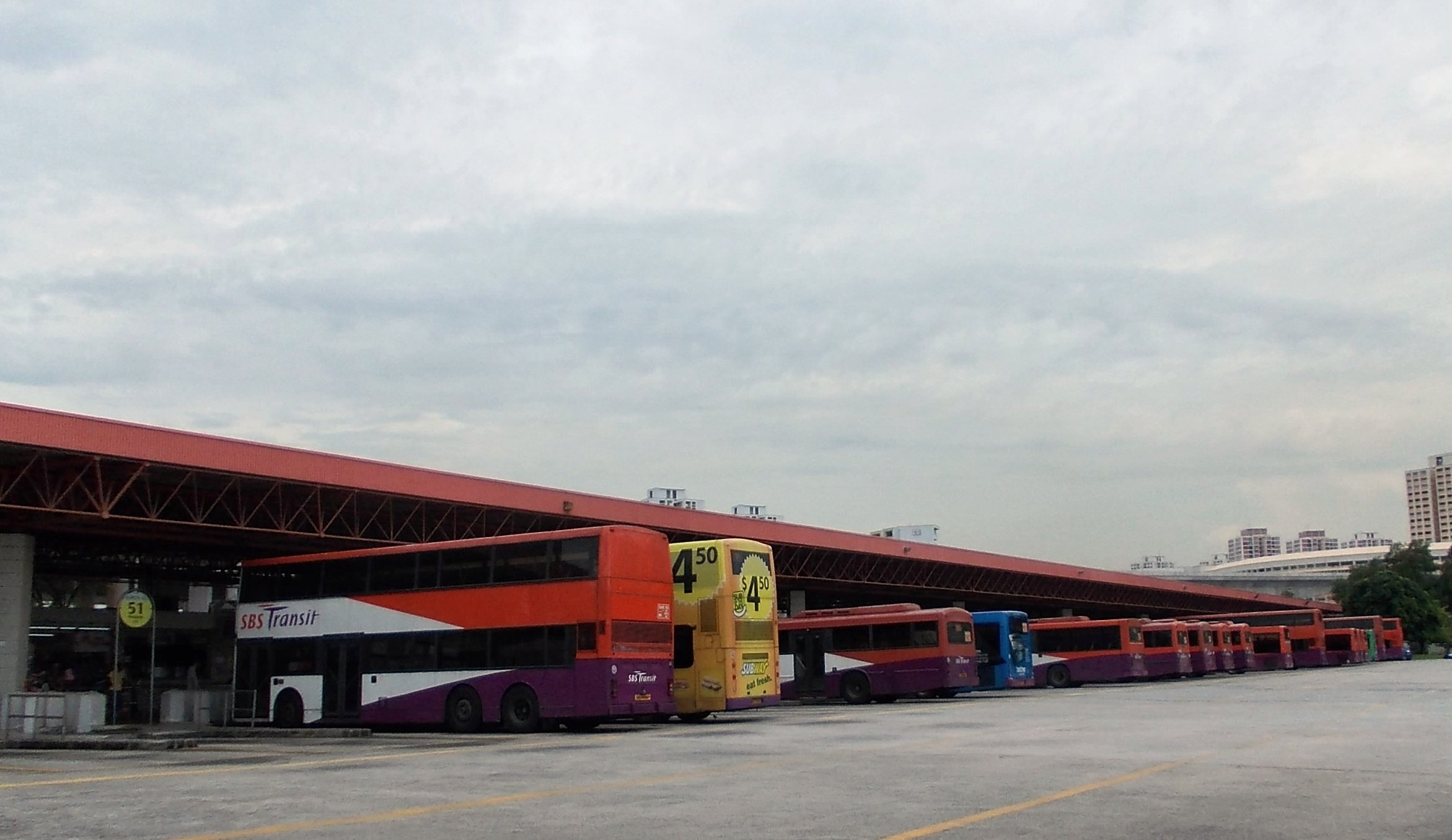
Buses parking at the end-on berths of the original Jurong East Bus Interchange

The original facility used for the bus interchange was built on 30 June 1985, west of the present MRT station and opposite the Jurong CPF building at Jurong Gateway Road. Most of the bus services in the bus interchange originated from the Teban Gardens Terminal and some from the former Jurong Bus Interchange, which were re-routed to this interchange when it opened. For years, despite being in the zone marked as Jurong Regional Centre, the bus interchange had a rather low level of passenger flow as compared to the larger Boon Lay Bus Interchange serving Jurong West New Town, the Jurong Industrial Estate, as well as institutions in the west including the Nanyang Technological University. The interchange serves mainly commuters travelling to the various housing estates, schools, religious places, tourist attractions and industrial places in Jurong East and those travelling to Malaysia via 2nd Link (Tuas Checkpoint).

=== Redevelopment plans ===
Following the redevelopments in Jurong which was announced in 2009, the original facility had been slated to be rebuilt into an air-conditioned facility as part of a commercial development on the site, which the commercial development and surrounding commercial places, together with the MRT station, will be collectively known as the Jurong East Integrated Transport Hub, similar to the rest of earlier hubs built. The rebuilding plan came along with the other plots of land surrounding the original facility being sold off to developers for commercial developments on 27 October 2010 when the Land Transport Authority released a tender for a "Proposed Jurong East Temporary Bus Interchange" indicating the redevelopment of the bus interchange. The land (MK05-08622X) occupied by the original facility was to be acquired by Singapore Land Authority for development into a commercial centre 10 years later and the original interchange to relocate to a temporary facility. The construction of the temporary facility spanned from middle of 2011 to the end of 2011.

The temporary facility is located at the south of the MRT station along Jurong Gateway Road, roughly 0.2 km South-East from the original facility, opposite JCube at the western end of it and the JTC Corporation headquarters at the eastern end. It has the same colour scheme of red as the original facility and it somewhat resembles the temporary facility used by Boon Lay Temporary Bus Interchange.

In 2015, Services 715, 716, 717 and PCS shuttle service were relocated to start from the bus stop at Jurong East Stn/Int along Boon Lay Way.

=== Development of Jurong Region Line ===
The temporary bus interchange was relocated to the interim bus interchange near the western end of JCube, bordered by Jurong Town Hall Road, Jurong East Street 12 & Jurong Gateway Road on 6 December 2020, lasting until 2027. The existing temporary bus interchange will be demolished to make way for an integrated transport hub with Jurong Region line's Jurong East station. Due to the lack of parking space in the interim interchange, bus services 78, 160 and 870 will start at Jurong Town Hall Bus Interchange whereas CW3 and CW4 will be relocated to the Private pick-up/drop-off point along Venture Avenue. Bus service 97, 97e, 197 & 333 will skip Jurong East Central (Blk 134) and Jurong Town Hall Road (Jurong East Library). Full-day bus lanes will be implemented at Jurong Gateway Road. Bus Service 79 will start at Boon Lay Bus Interchange and loop at Blk 131.

== Bus contracting model ==
Under the bus contracting model, all bus services operating from Jurong East Bus Interchange were divided into six bus packages, operated by two bus operators.

=== List of bus services ===
| Operator | Package | Routes |
|---|---|---|
| SBS Transit | Bishan-Toa Payoh | 52 |
| SBS Transit | Bukit Merah | 993 |
| SBS Transit | Clementi | 197, 506 (from June 2027) |
| SBS Transit | Sengkang-Hougang | 51, 51A |
| SBS Transit | Serangoon-Eunos | 105, 105B, 506 |
| SMRT Buses | Serangoon-Eunos | 105, 105B (from June 2027) |
| Tower Transit Singapore | Bulim | 41, 49, 66, 98, 98M, 143, 143M, 183, 183B, 333, 334, 335 |
