= Cantonment MRT station =

Mass Rapid Transit station in Singapore

Cantonment CC31 广东民 (Note: pinyin: Guǎngdōngmín) கெண்டொன்மன்
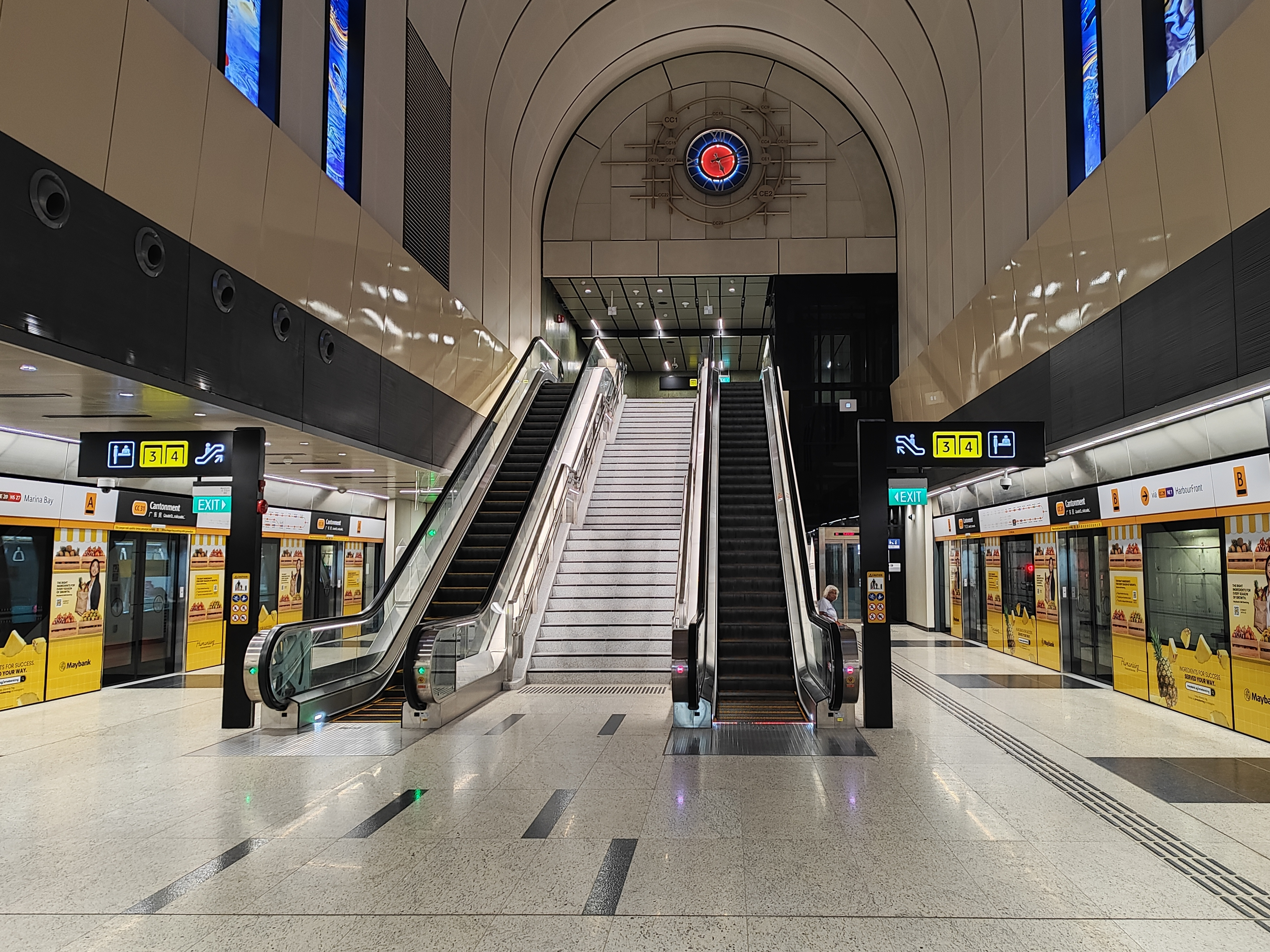
- MRT platforms of Cantonment station with the analogue clock

General information
- Location: 100 Everton Road, Singapore 089395
- Coordinates: 01°16′22″N 103°50′12″E
- System: Mass Rapid Transit (MRT) station
- Owner: Land Transport Authority
- Operator: SMRT Trains
- Line: Circle Line
- Platforms: 2 (1 island platform)
- Tracks: 2
- Connections: Bus (Kampong Bahru Bus Terminal), taxi

Construction
- Structure type: Underground
- Depth: 28 metres (92 ft)
- Platform levels: 1
- Parking: Yes
- Cycle facilities: Yes
- Accessible: Yes

History
- Opened: 12 July 2026; 3 months ago
- Former names: Old Railway Station, Spottiswoode Park

Services
Preceding station	Mass Rapid Transit	Following station
Keppel Clockwise	Circle Line	Prince Edward Road Anticlockwise
Keppel towards Dhoby Ghaut	Circle Line	Prince Edward Road Terminus
Track layout
Location
- Location within Singapore Rail central area

Cantonment MRT station is an underground Mass Rapid Transit (MRT) station on the Circle Line (CCL), situated in Bukit Merah, Singapore. Located underneath the former Tanjong Pagar railway station, the station serves the Tanjong Pagar Distripark, Singapore Art Museum, Cantonment Primary School and the Police Cantonment Complex.

The station was first announced in October 2015 as part of Stage 6 of the CCL (CCL6). Construction of the station began in 2017, and involved the relocation of the railway station's platform canopies and dismantling part of the platforms. Steel supports and protective sheets were erected to protect the railway station and its heritage elements. The station commenced operations on 12 July 2026 along with the CCL6 stations.

Cantonment station's design drew inspiration from the former railway station, featuring a curved ceiling, murals and an analogue clock at the platforms. It is also a designated Civil Defence shelter. The artwork The Journey Between by Han Sai Por is displayed along the station's concourse as part of the Art in Transit programme.

== History ==
The station was first announced on 29 October 2015 by the Land Transport Authority (LTA) as part of CCL6, which LTA said would "complete the circle" by connecting HarbourFront and Marina Bay stations. The project, which has three stations in total, was aimed at increasing the connectivity of the southern edge of the Central Business District, as well as reducing travel times within the MRT network.

Contract 883 for the construction of Cantonment station was awarded to China State Construction Engineering Corporation Limited (Singapore Branch) for S$205 million (US$148.5 million) in November 2017. Construction began that year, with an expected completion date of 2025.

=== Construction ===
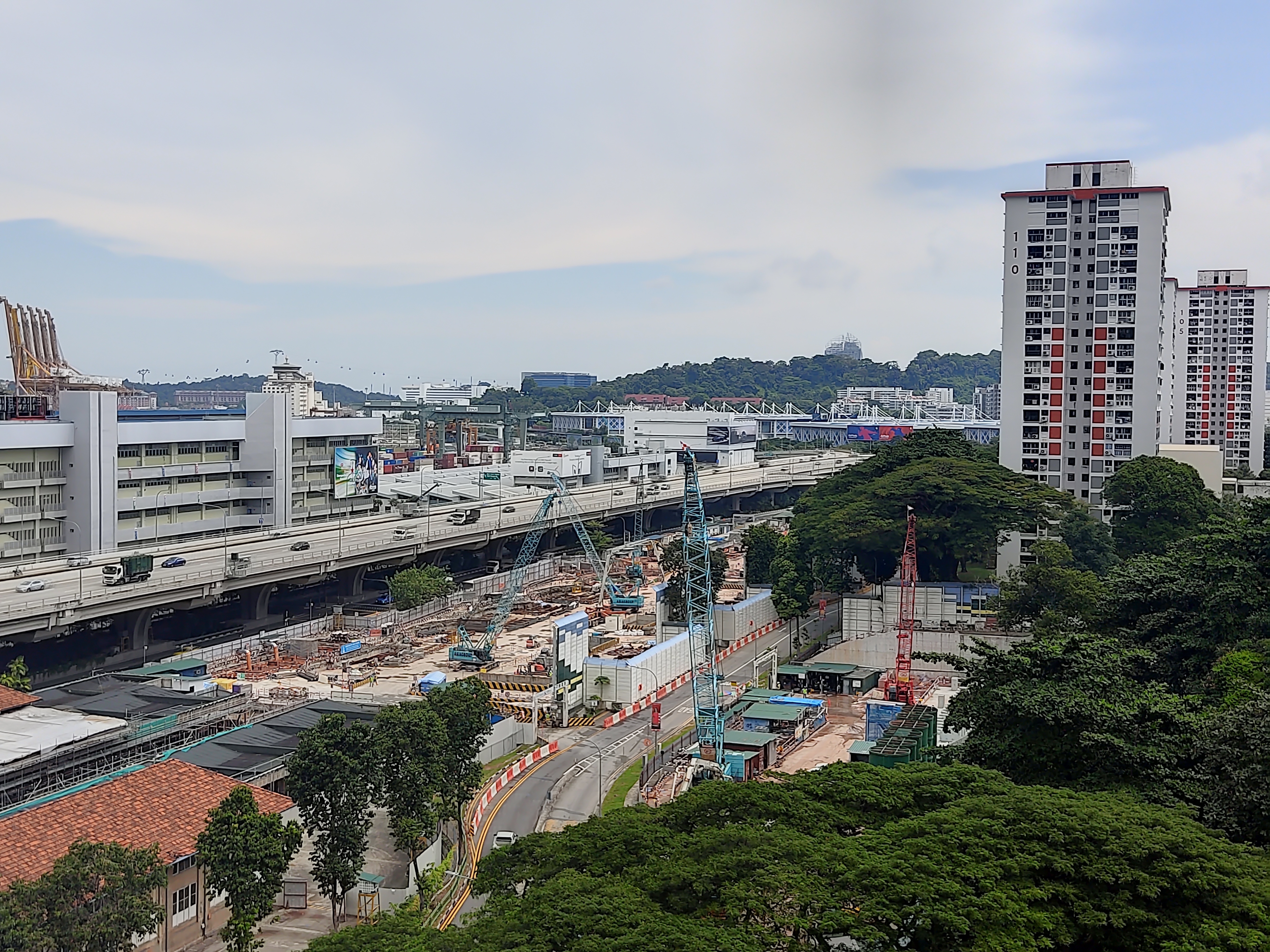
Construction site of the station in August 2022

To facilitate construction of Cantonment station, the platform canopy structures of the former Tanjong Pagar Railway Station were relocated to a nearby restoration yard in November 2017. Subsequently, a 580 m (1,900 ft) segment of the old railway platforms were dismantled in March 2018 as part of a S$33.5 million (US$24.3 million) heritage preservation effort.

The tunnels between this station and the adjacent Prince Edward Road station were constructed only 6.7 metres (22 ft) below the piles of the former station. Prior to the tunnelling works, an extensive survey was conducted to prevent the tunnels from crossing through the building's foundations. Steel supports and protective sheets were erected to protect the railway station's key heritage elements, facade, and interior, with more than 600 monitoring instruments installed to watch out for any building settlement.

In September 2020, the Sun Wu Tunnel Boring Machine managed to tunnel underneath the old Tanjong Pagar Railway station building. Due to the COVID-19 pandemic, transport minister Ong Ye Kung announced in March 2021 that the completion of CCL6 would be delayed by one year to 2026. Tunnelling works for the CCL6 were completed on 12 January 2022 with a final tunnel breakthrough from Prince Edward Road station into this station.

To construct the tunnels from Cantonment station to Keppel station, the Keppel viaduct had to be closely monitored while underpinning the viaduct with new micro piles. Three bored piles were removed for the tunnelling works. The platform canopy shelters were restored to their original places in March 2024 via self-propelled modular transporters that were typically used to lift heavy loads at construction sites. Previously cut during the dismantlement, they were stitched together with new steel reinforcement bars embedded in concrete.

=== Opening ===
Transport minister Chee Hong Tat announced in December 2024 that CCL6 was targeted to open in the first half of 2026. In February 2026, transport minister Jeffrey Siow said that the extension's opening is dependent on the completion of current CCL tunnel strengthening works so that final testing and preparation for CCL6 can proceed.

On 14 May 2026, Lasalle College of the Arts hosted a fashion show, themed DE:CENTERING, for graduating students at Cantonment station. The station platform was converted into a runway, and the show was attended by Siow as the guest of honour. Siow announced that the stations of CCL6 would commence operations on 12 July 2026, with a public preview on 4 July. The public preview allowed members of the public to travel for free between the three CCL6 stations, and also featured many activities and booths for the public to participate in. Official merchandise, designed to commemorate the completion of the Circle Line, was also sold at this station with special promotions during the public preview.

The station opened as planned on 12 July. A few commuters boarding at Cantonment remarked that the CCL6 had cut their travel times to destinations such as Botanic Gardens or VivoCity at HarbourFront.

== Station details ==
Cantonment station is located between Keppel and Prince Edward Road stations on the CCL. The station code is CC31. It kept its working name in a naming poll conducted by the LTA. Other names included in the poll were "Old Railway Station" and "Spottiswoode Park". On most days, the first train departs the station at around 6 am and the last train departs shortly before midnight. Trains arrive at intervals of two to three minutes during peak hours and up to seven minutes during off-peak hours.

The station is located underneath the former Tanjong Pagar railway station and between Keppel Road and Spottiswoode Park Road. The station also serves the Tanjong Pagar Distripark, where the Singapore Art Museum is located, as well as Cantonment Primary School. Other landmarks surrounding the station include Singapore General Hospital, Kampong Bahru Bus Terminal, Gurdwara Sahib Silat Road Silk Temple, Tanjong Pagar Community Club and the Police Cantonment Complex.

=== Architecture ===
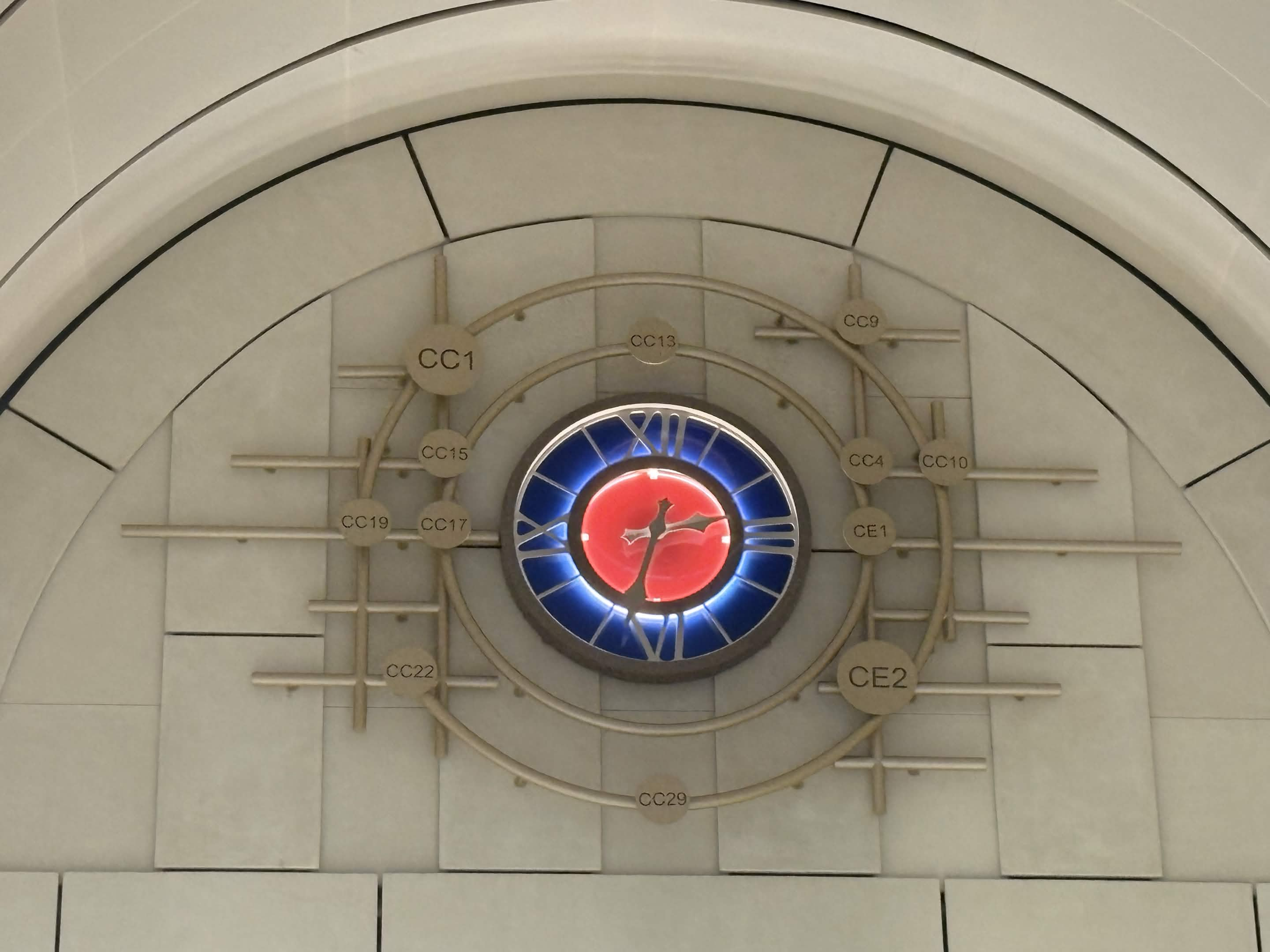
Zoomed-in image of the analogue clock

Cantonment is a three-level underground station with a depth of 28 m (92 ft). Designed by RDC Architects, the station's design drew inspiration from the former Tanjong Pagar Railway Station. To protect the historic terminal's shallow foundations, Cantonment was built deep underground, creating a spacious double-volume hall featuring a curved roof and 24 vertical glass murals above the platforms. Installed at one end of the platform is a large analogue clock featuring the interchanges of the CCL, framed by two circular rings representing the line. The entrance's walls and roofs have green accents that matches the hue of the old terminal’s roof. Siow remarked that the CCL6 stations were among the "most beautifully designed stations on the MRT network".

The centralised cooling system for the CCL6 stations is located at Cantonment station. The station has 102 bicycle parking spaces. It is also a Civil Defence shelter, with reinforced structures and heavy steel blast doors designed to protect the public during emergencies such as wartime attacks and security crises.

=== Artwork ===
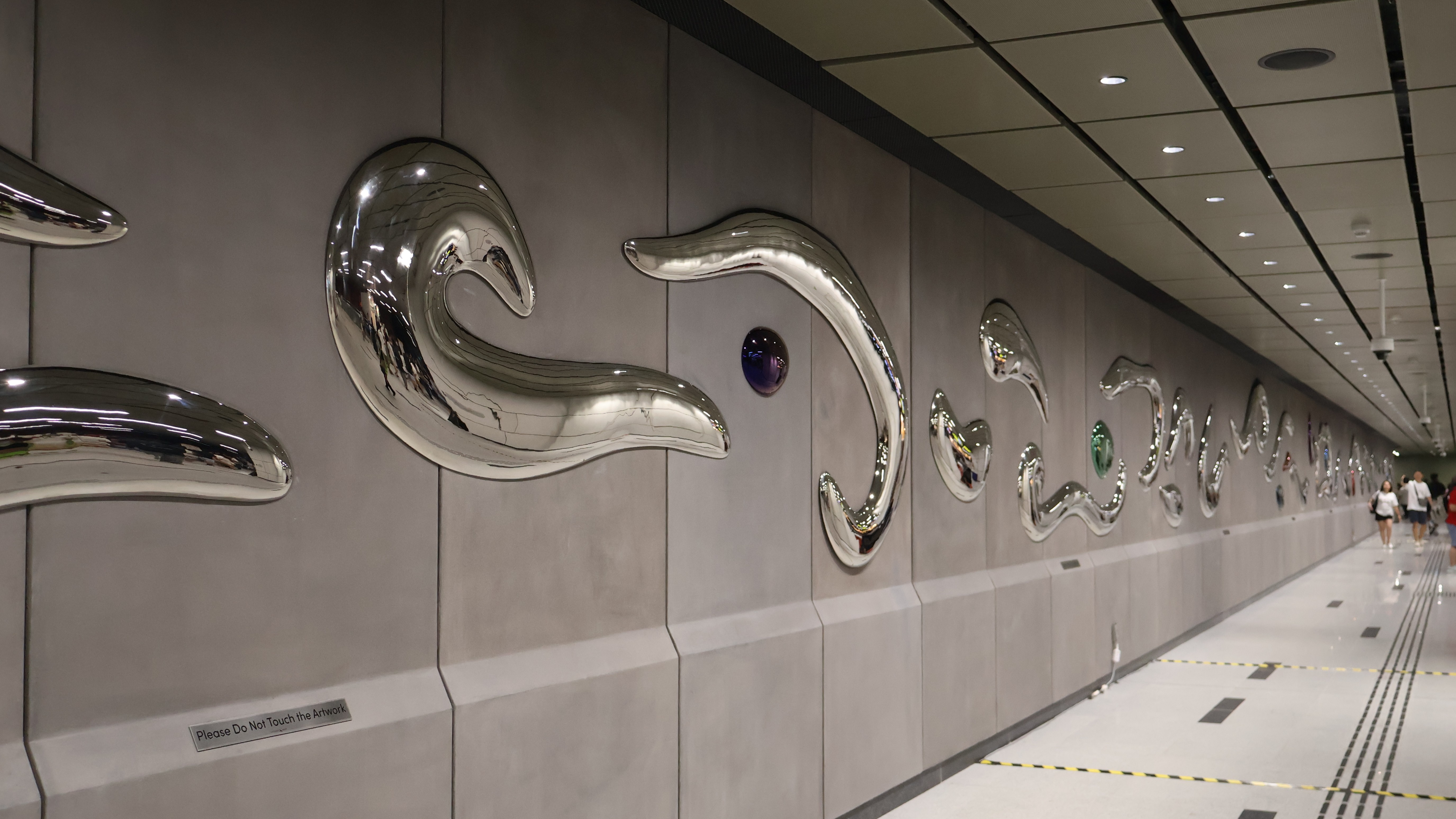
The Journey Between

The Journey Between by Han Sai Por is displayed at the station concourse as part of the MRT network's Art in Transit programme. Comprising variably coloured flowing sculptures made of stainless steel, the artwork conceptually examines the themes of transit, passage, and stillness. The sculptures were shaped to resemble train tracks with their polished surfaces reflecting passing commuters, and the coloured dots between the wave stripes represent MRT stations. Han initially sculpted the forms in clay before scanning and enlarging them into stainless steel. The work is intended to pay tribute to the Cantonment area's history as a site of transit, connection and transformation along the former coastline.
