= PPJ =

PPJ may refer to:

- Pallo-Pojat Juniorit, an association football club based in Helsinki, Finland
- Parti Pirates Jeunes
- Putrajaya Corporation
- Cycloparc PPJ
- Pasir Panjang MRT station (MRT station abbreviation), a Mass Rapid Transit station in Singapore
- PPJ Framework, the support library used by ported applications on .NET
