= Labrador Park MRT station =

Mass Rapid Transit station in Singapore

Labrador Park CC27 拉柏多公园 லாப்ரடார் பூங்கா
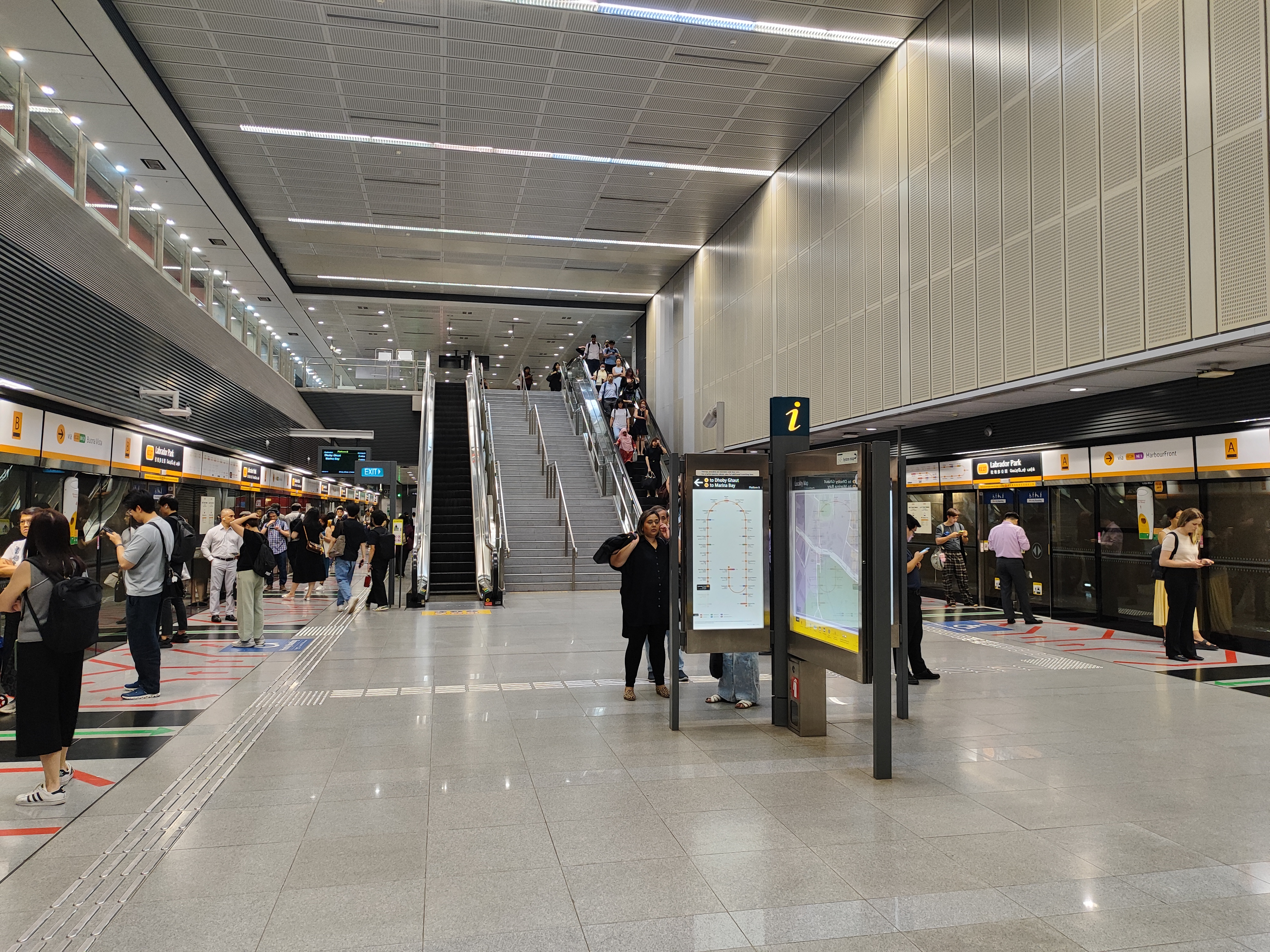
- Platform level of Labrador Park MRT station.

General information
- Location: 701 Telok Blangah Road, Singapore 109029
- Coordinates: 01°16′20″N 103°48′10″E
- System: Mass Rapid Transit (MRT) station
- Owner: Land Transport Authority
- Operator: SMRT Trains
- Line: Circle Line
- Platforms: 2 (1 island platform)
- Tracks: 2
- Connections: Bus, Taxi

Construction
- Structure type: Underground
- Platform levels: 1
- Parking: Yes (PSA Building)
- Cycle facilities: Yes
- Accessible: Yes

Other information
- Station code: LBD

History
- Opened: 8 October 2011; 15 years ago
- Former names: Alexandra, Tanjong Berlayar

Passengers
- June 2024: 5,818 per day

Services
Preceding station	Mass Rapid Transit	Following station
Pasir Panjang Clockwise	Circle Line	Telok Blangah Anticlockwise
Pasir Panjang towards Dhoby Ghaut	Circle Line	Telok Blangah towards Prince Edward Road
Track layout
Location
- Location within Singapore Rail central area

Labrador Park MRT station is an underground Mass Rapid Transit (MRT) station on the Circle Line, located within Bukit Merah planning area, Singapore.

Built underneath Telok Blangah Road near the junctions of Alexandra Road and Labrador Villa Road, this station was named after the nearby Labrador Nature Reserve. It is the nearest MRT station to the PSA Building and Gillman Barracks, the latter of which is now home to numerous art galleries.

== Etymology ==
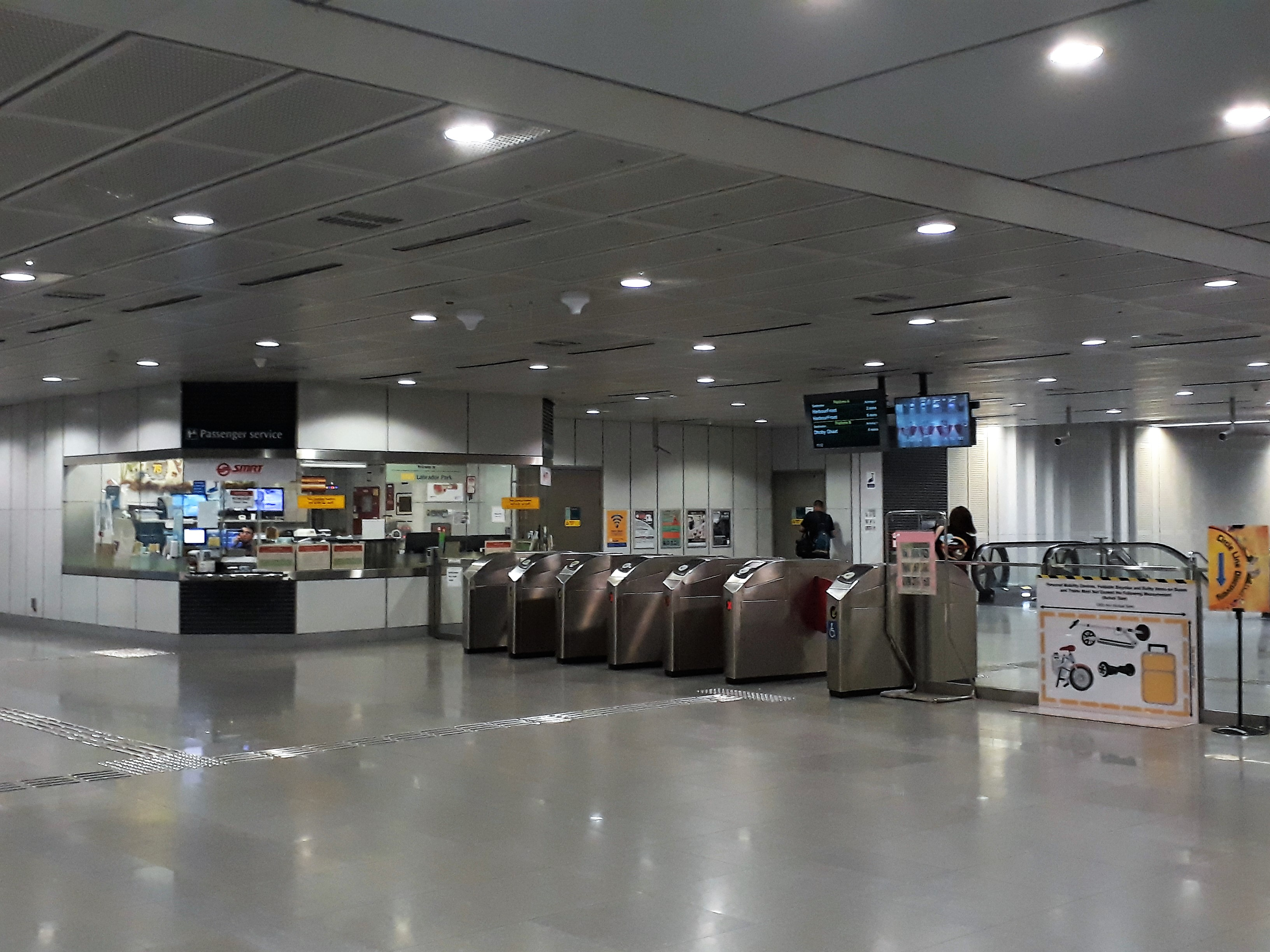
Concourse level of the station.

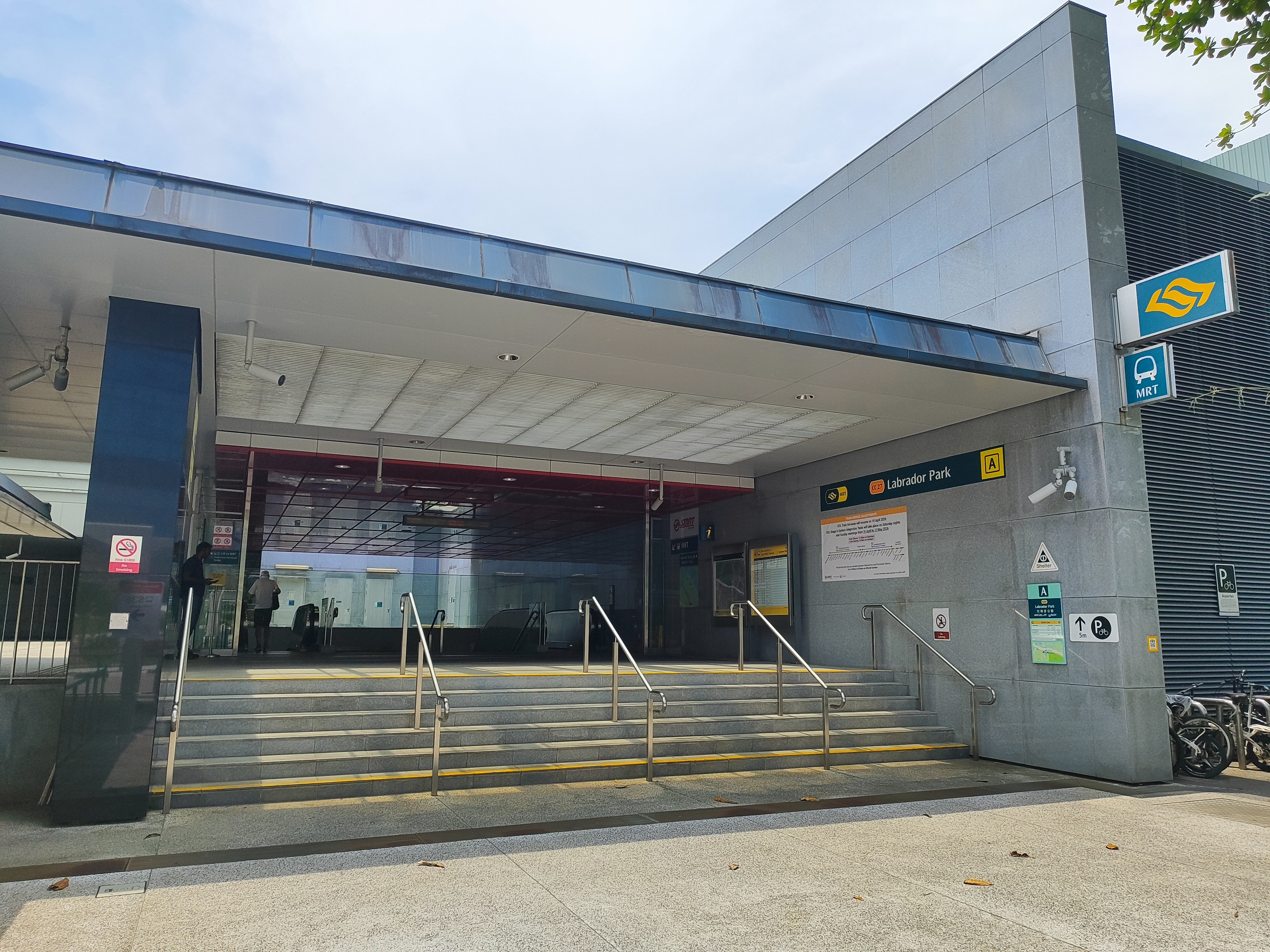
Exit A of the station.

This station is named after Labrador Park, a historical site which held former fortifications and naval guns built by the British forces in Singapore before World War II. Another name is also Tanjong Berlayer. It is the name given to the craggy granite outcrop that formerly stood in the gateway of Keppel Harbour in Singapore. The rocky outcrop served as navigational aids to ancient mariners sailing through the swift waters of the narrow channel between them, but was subsequently destroyed by the British in 1848 to widen the channel for larger vessels to sail through. In 2005, a symbolic replica was erected by the Singapore government near its original site to mark the role in the history. It was also called Batu Berlayar in Malay, Dragon's Teeth Gate in English and Long Ya Men in Chinese.

== Art in Transit ==
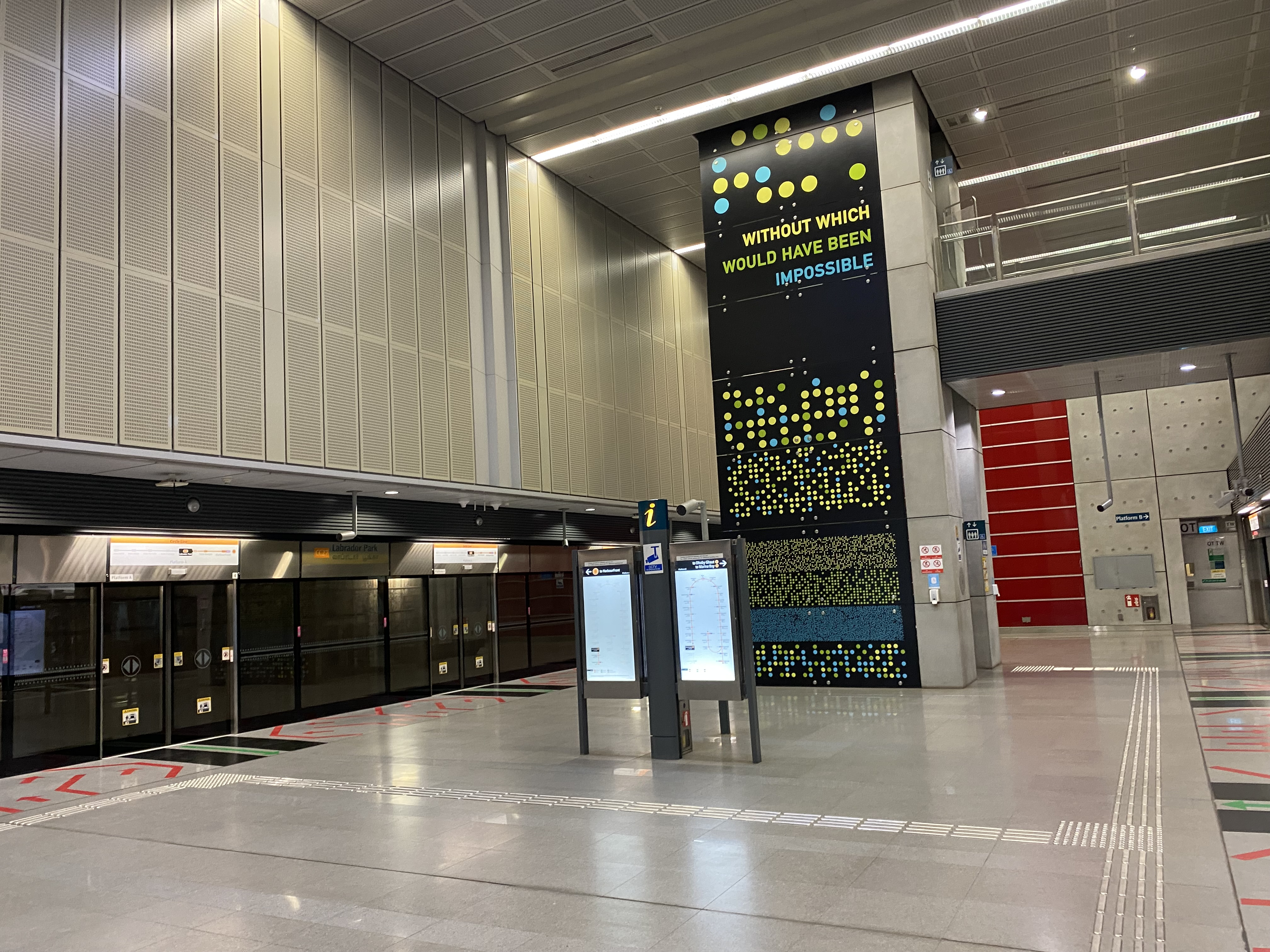
The artwork on the lift shaft, viewed from the platforms

The artwork featured in this station under the Art in Transit programme is Without Which/Would Have Been/Impossible by Heman Chong. The art piece, located on the side of the lift shaft in the station, consists of the title of the piece and several coloured circles of different sizes arranged in a regular fashion. According to the artist, the motif came from a "microscopic view of a single rock" found at Labrador Park, highlighting the park's distinctive identity as the last surviving rocky sea cliff in Singapore.
