= Keppel MRT station =

Mass Rapid Transit station in Singapore

Keppel CC30 吉宝 கெப்பல்
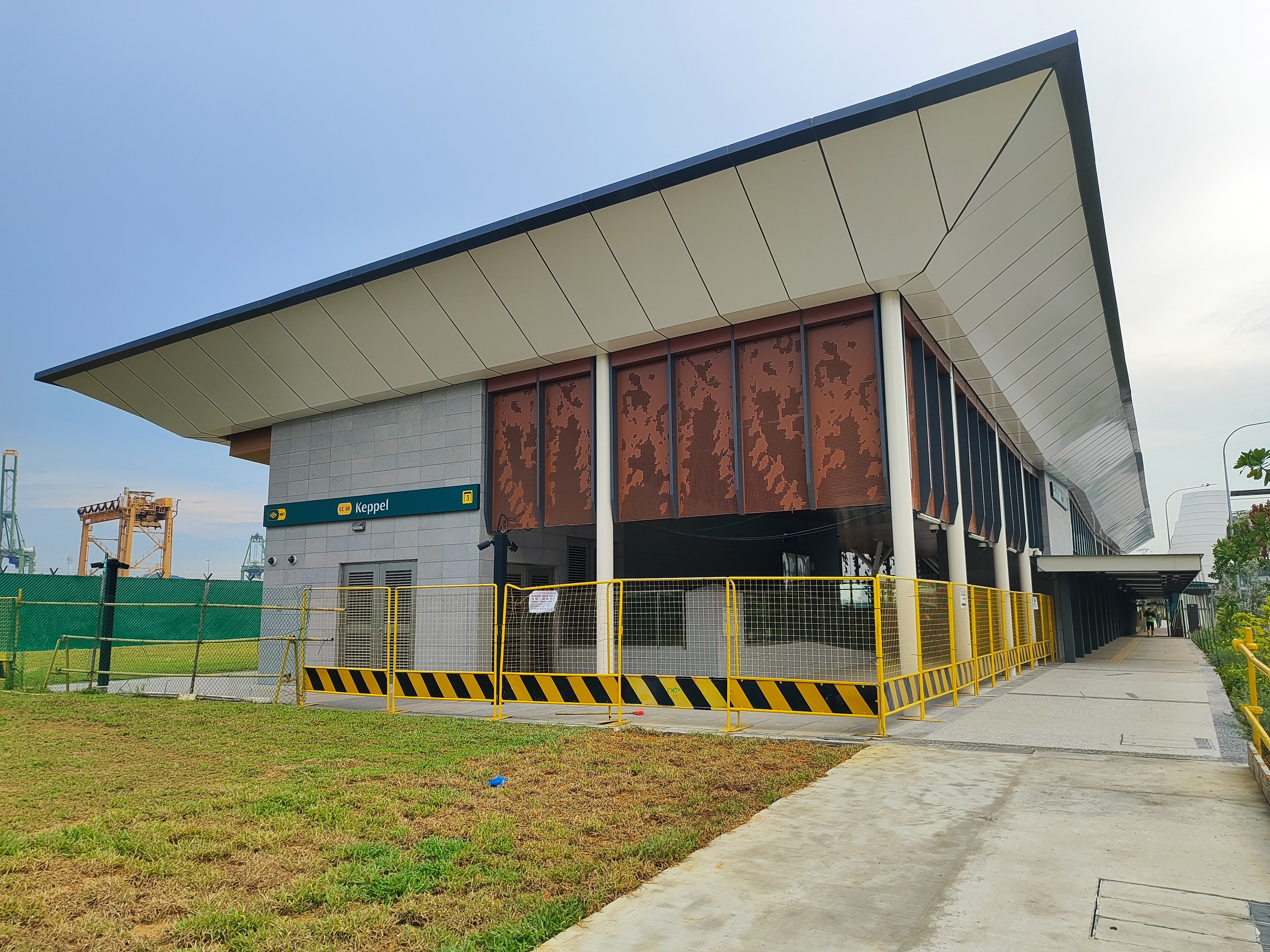
- Exit 3 of Keppel station

General information
- Location: 51 Keppel Road, Singapore 099423
- Coordinates: 01°16′12″N 103°49′52″E
- System: Mass Rapid Transit (MRT) station
- Owner: Land Transport Authority
- Operator: SMRT Trains
- Line: Circle Line
- Platforms: 2 (1 island platform)
- Tracks: 4 (including a track siding for each platform)
- Connections: Bus, Taxi

Construction
- Structure type: Underground
- Depth: 20 m (66 ft)
- Platform levels: 1
- Parking: No
- Cycle facilities: Yes
- Accessible: Yes

Other information
- Station code: KPL

History
- Opened: 12 July 2026; 3 months ago
- Former names: Keppel Harbour, Keppel Port

Services
Preceding station	Mass Rapid Transit	Following station
HarbourFront Clockwise	Circle Line	Cantonment Anticlockwise
HarbourFront towards Dhoby Ghaut	Circle Line	Cantonment towards Prince Edward Road
Track layout
Location
- Location within Singapore Rail central area

Keppel MRT station is an underground Mass Rapid Transit (MRT) station on the Circle Line, located in Bukit Merah planning area, Singapore. It is located along Keppel Road, near Keppel Harbour, and will serve the upcoming Greater Southern Waterfront development.

The station was first announced in October 2015 as part of Stage 6 of the CCL (CCL6). Construction of the station began in 2017, and operations commenced on 12 July 2026 along with the CCL6 stations.

== History ==
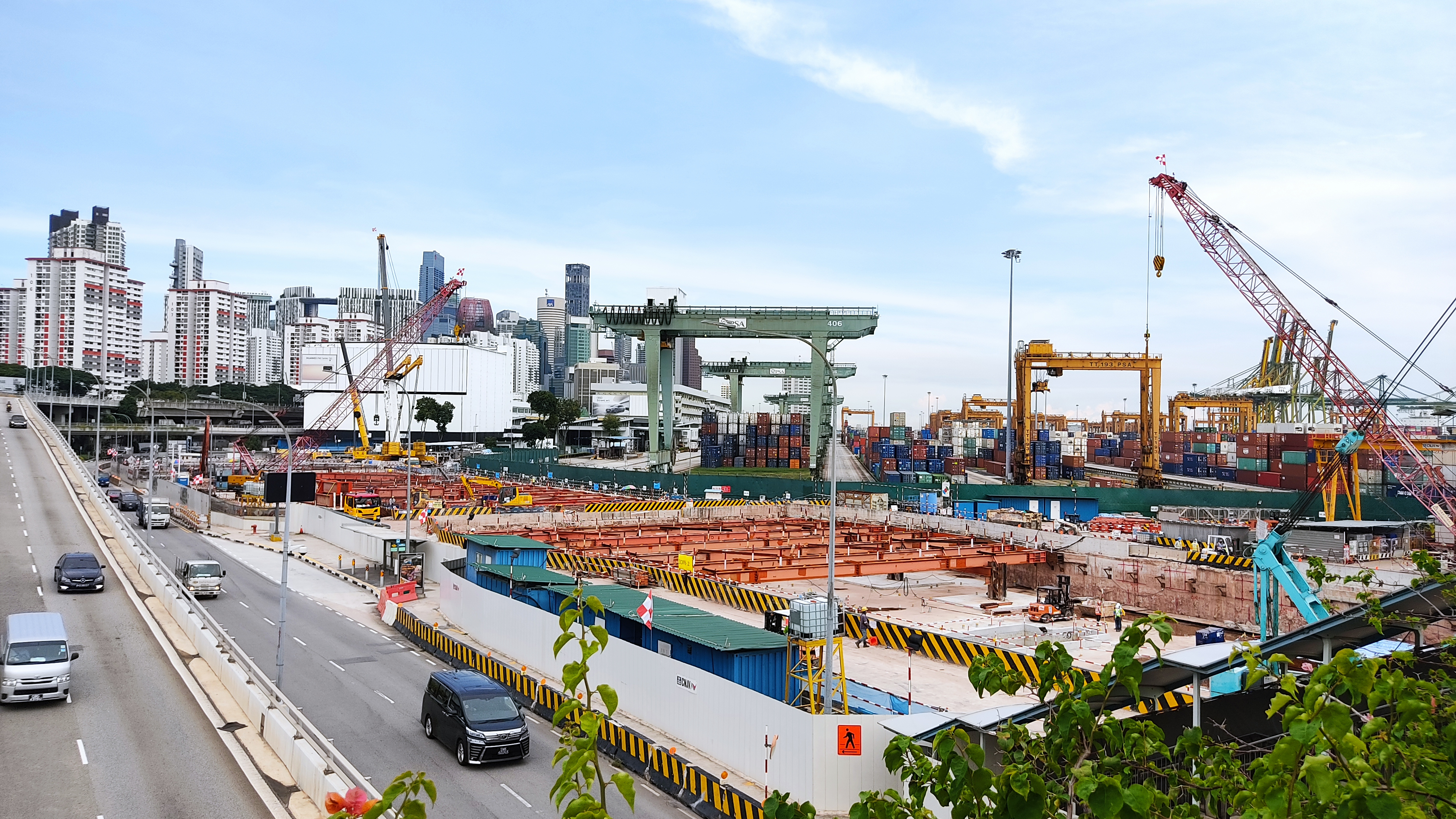
Construction site of Keppel station in 2020

The station was first announced on 29 October 2015 by the Land Transport Authority (LTA) as part of CCL6, which LTA said would "complete the circle" by connecting HarbourFront and Marina Bay stations. The project, which has three stations in total, was aimed at increasing the connectivity of the southern edge of the Central Business District, as well as reducing travel times within the MRT network.

Contract 882 for the construction of Keppel station and associated tunnels was awarded China State Construction Engineering Corporation Limited (Singapore Branch) and Nishimatsu Construction Co. Ltd. Joint Venture (JV) at a sum of S$313.8 million (US$227.24 million) in September 2017. Construction began at the end of 2017, with expected completion date of 2025.

On 25 July 2019, tunnelling works for the CCL6 started with the launch of the tunnel boring machine at Keppel station, which tunneled to the existing CCL HarbourFront station. Due to the COVID-19 pandemic, transport minister Ong Ye Kung announced in March 2021 that the completion of CCL6 would be delayed by one year to 2026.

To construct the tunnels from Keppel station to Cantonment station, the Keppel viaduct had to be closely monitored while underpinning the viaduct with new micro piles. Three bored piles were removed for the tunnelling works.

Transport minister Chee Hong Tat announced in December 2024 that CCL6 was targeted to open in the first half of 2026. In February 2026, transport minister Jeffrey Siow said that the extension's opening is dependent on the completion of current CCL tunnel strengthening works so that final testing and preparation for CCL6 can proceed.

On 14 May 2026, Siow announced that the stations of CCL6 would commence operations on 12 July 2026, with a public preview on 4 July. The station opened as planned on 12 July.

== Station details ==
Situated along Keppel Road, the station serves the Keppel Distripark, and would serve future developments along the Greater Southern Waterfront.

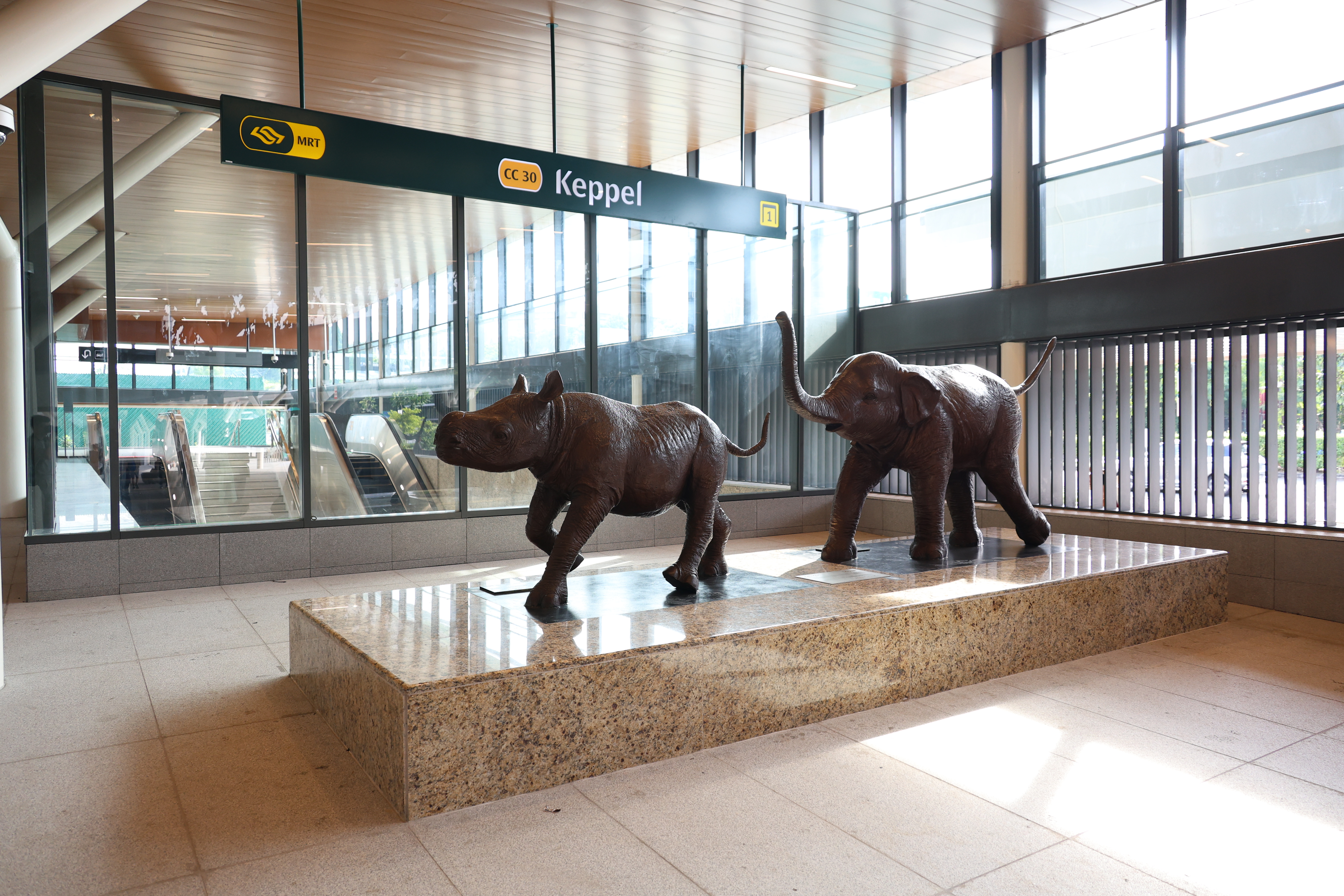
Aarin | Elimu at Keppel MRT station

Several station exits feature green roofs with plants grown on rooftops. It also has an underground bicycle park, providing cyclists direct access to the concourse. This bicycle park used to be where the tunnel boring machine was launched, and, instead of filling it with soil as usual, was repurposed as a bicycle park to serve future developments in the area.

On the concourse level, the station has an exhibition that replicates a tunnel boring machine that was used to excavate the CCL station and tunnels.

On ground level, the design of the ventilation shafts is inspired by the nearby cable car that operates from Mount Faber to Sentosa via HarbourFront, and are coloured yellow, blue, and red.

The station has two art installations. At the centre of the unpaid concourse area is where Uncontainable Dreams, a 2-dimensional one-point perspective drawing by Kenneth Koh Qibao, is located, and is part of the Art in Transit programme by LTA. The other installation, Aarin | Elimu, is located on the ground level, and is donated by Keppel Ltd as part of LTA's Gift of Art programme, which itself is part of Art in Transit.
