= Telok Blangah MRT station =

Mass Rapid Transit station in Singapore

Telok Blangah CC28 直落布兰雅 தெலுக் பிளாங்கா
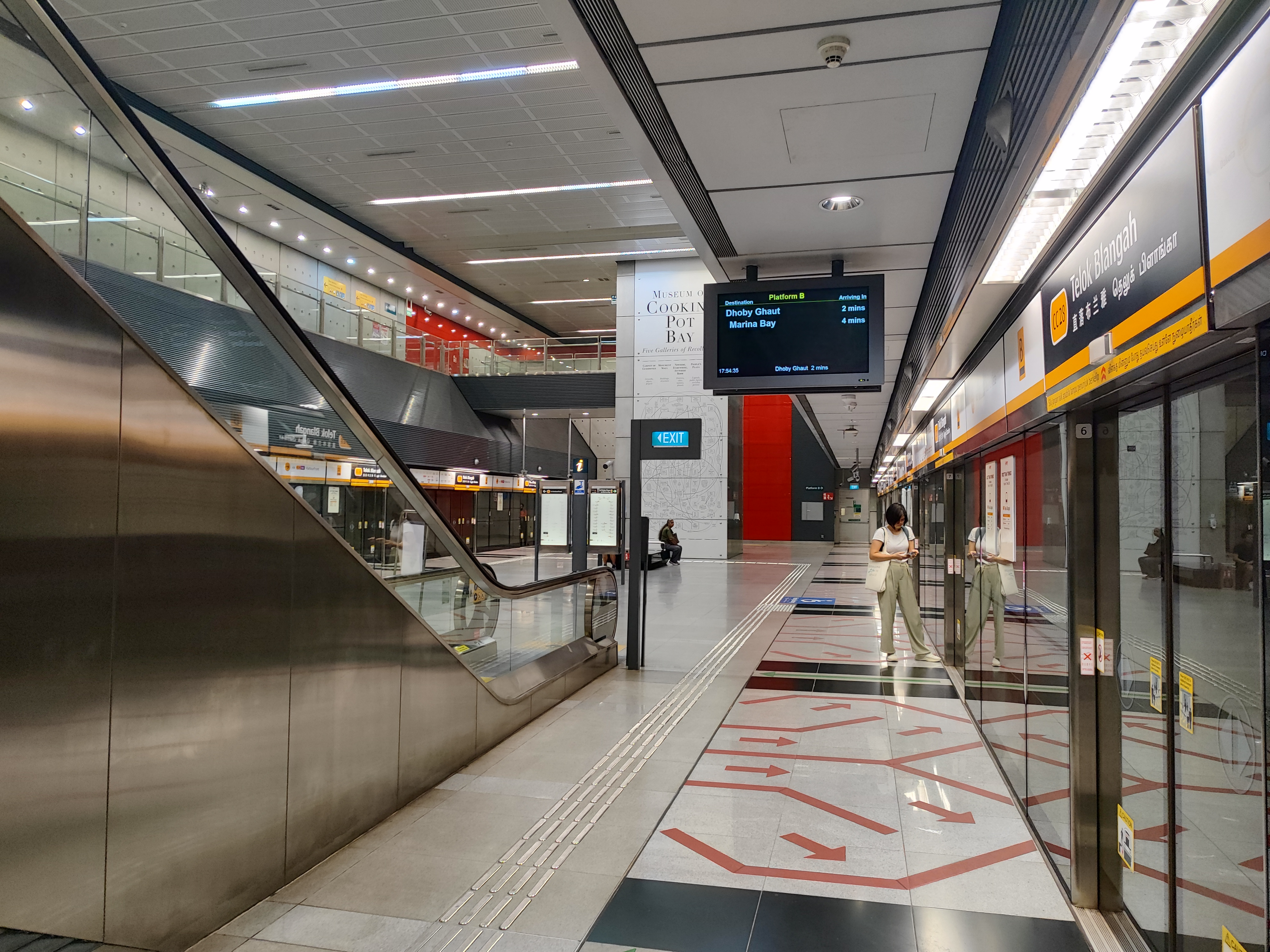
- Platform level of Telok Blangah station.

General information
- Location: 463 Telok Blangah Road, Singapore 109028
- Coordinates: 01°16′14″N 103°48′35″E
- System: Mass Rapid Transit (MRT) station
- Owner: Land Transport Authority
- Operator: SMRT Trains
- Line: Circle Line
- Platforms: 2 (1 island platform)
- Tracks: 2
- Connections: Bus, Taxi

Construction
- Structure type: Underground
- Platform levels: 1
- Parking: No
- Cycle facilities: Yes
- Accessible: Yes

Other information
- Station code: TLB

History
- Opened: 8 October 2011; 15 years ago
- Former names: Keppel

Passengers
- June 2024: 3,463 per day

Services
Preceding station	Mass Rapid Transit	Following station
Labrador Park Clockwise	Circle Line	HarbourFront Anticlockwise
Labrador Park towards Dhoby Ghaut	Circle Line	HarbourFront towards Prince Edward Road
Track layout
Location
- Location within Singapore Rail central area

Telok Blangah MRT station is an underground Mass Rapid Transit (MRT) station on the Circle Line, situated in Bukit Merah planning area, Singapore. It is located along Telok Blangah Road near the junction of Henderson Road, and primarily serves the residential neighbourhood of Telok Blangah.

The station is named after the nearby Telok Blangah estate, which was derived from Blangah in Malay meaning a stopping place, or Blanga referring to an Indian clay cooking pot in reference to the shape of the bay behind Keppel Harbour. It serves residential developments in the Telok Blangah Drive and Telok Blangah Heights area.

== Art in Transit ==
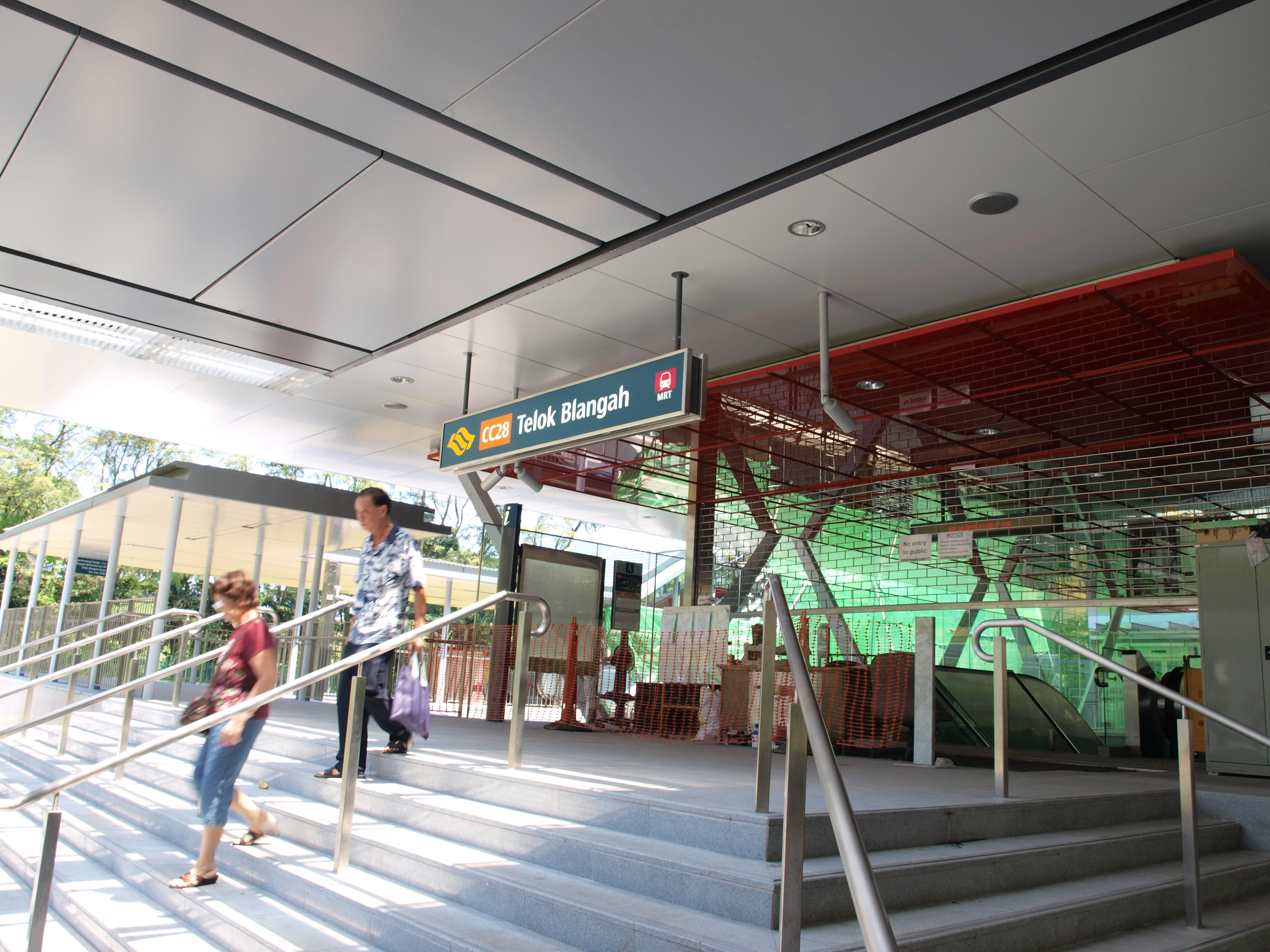
Entrance to Telok Blangah MRT station, before it was officially opened.

The artwork featured under the Art in Transit programme is Notes Towards A Museum Of Cooking Pot Bay by Michael Lee. Located on the lift shaft in the station, the artwork intertwines monuments, pop culture elements, real-life people (including the artist himself) and fantastical elements in a massive concept map which, as the title suggests, aims to contribute to a museum of "Cooking Pot Bay", which is a translation of "Telok Blangah".
