= MTower =

Office skyscraper in Singapore

mTower
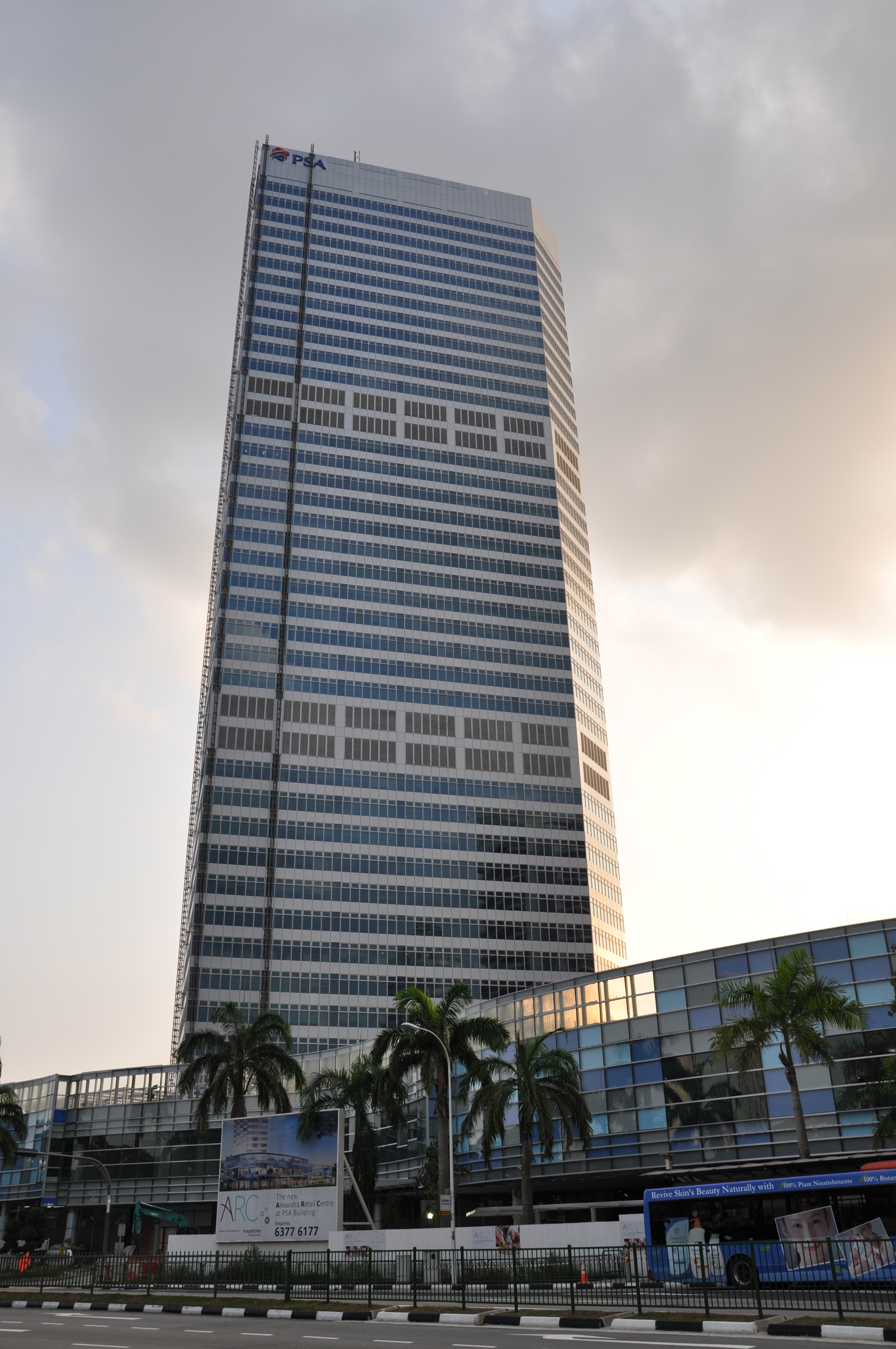
- Interactive map of the mTower area

General information
- Type: Commercial offices
- Architectural style: Modernism
- Location: 460 Alexandra Road; Singapore 119963; CC27 Labrador Park
- Coordinates: 1.2735°N 103.8012°E
- Construction started: 1985
- Completed: 1986
- Owner: Mapletree Commercial Trust

Height
- Roof: 183 m (600 ft)

Technical details
- Floor count: 42

Design and construction
- Architect: SAA Partnership

mTower, formerly known as PSA Building, is an integrated development in Singapore, comprising a 40-storey office building and a 3-storey retail centre, Alexandra Retail Centre. It is located at Alexandra Road, Singapore. The building also houses Singapore's Ministry of Transport and the Maritime and Port Authority of Singapore.

== Alexandra Retail Centre ==
Alexandra Retail Centre is a 3-storey retail centre, offering a wide range of amenities and F&B offerings to the working population in the vicinity. It is connected to the office premises via several links.

== Notable tenants ==
- Taipei Representative Office in Singapore, the foreign mission of the Republic of China (Taiwan), is located on the 23rd floor of mTower.
- GeoWorks, Singapore's geospatial industry centre operated by Singapore Land Authority, is located on the 7th floor of mTower
