= HarbourFront MRT station =

Mass Rapid Transit station in Singapore

HarbourFront NE1 CC29 港湾 ஹார்பர்ஃபிரண்ட்
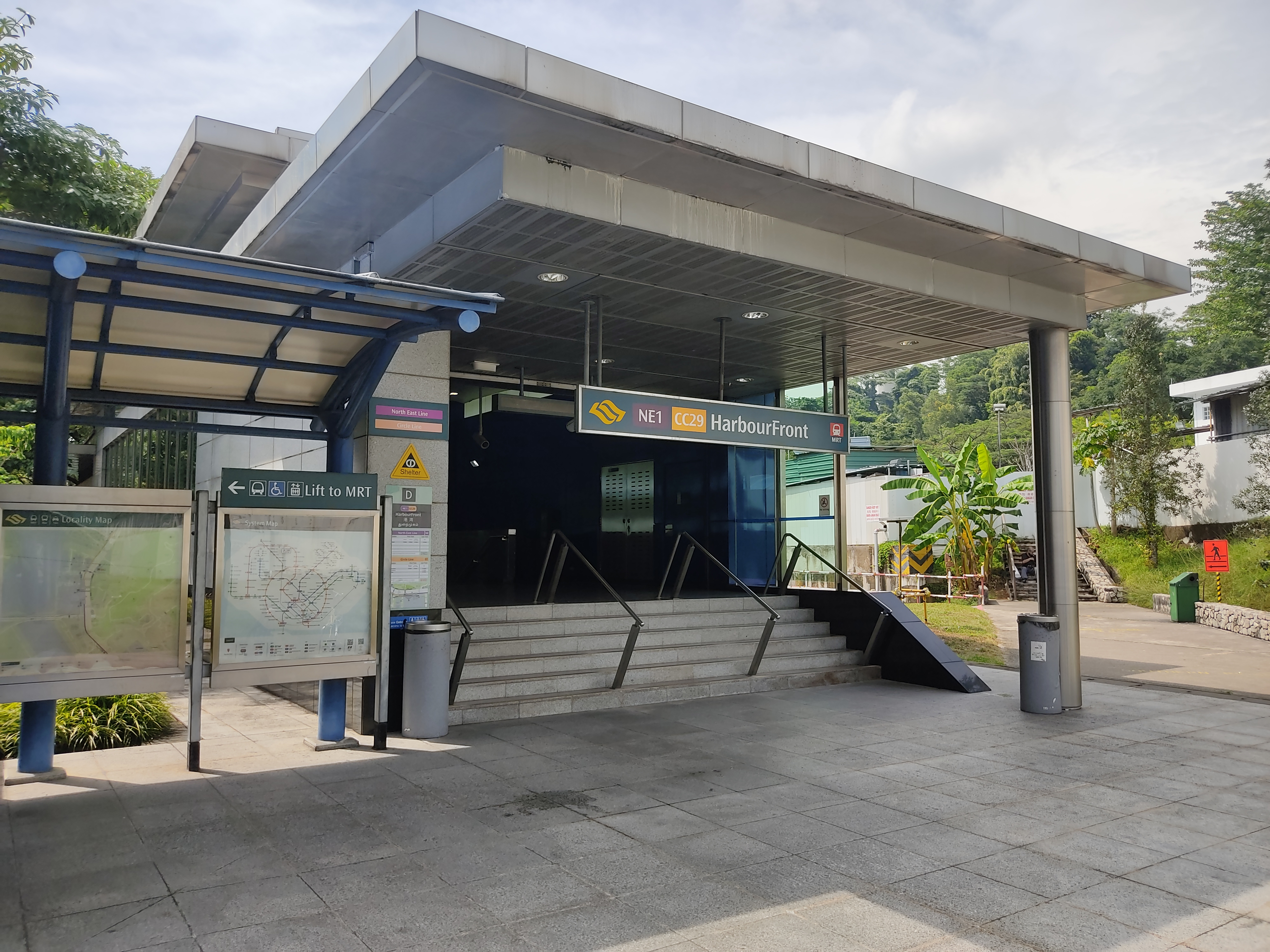
- Exit D of HarbourFront MRT station, showing the above-ground entrance.

General information
- Location: 81 Telok Blangah Road, Singapore 098867 (NEL); 83 Telok Blangah Road, Singapore 098886 (CCL)
- Coordinates: 01°15′55″N 103°49′20″E
- System: Mass Rapid Transit (MRT) interchange and terminus
- Owner: Land Transport Authority
- Operator: SBS Transit (North East Line); SMRT Trains (Circle Line)
- Line: North East Line Circle Line
- Platforms: 4 (2 island platforms)
- Tracks: 4
- Connections: HarbourFront Bus Interchange, Sentosa Express, Taxi

Construction
- Structure type: Underground
- Platform levels: 1
- Parking: Yes (VivoCity, Singapore Cruise Centre)
- Cycle facilities: Yes
- Accessible: Yes

History
- Opened: 20 June 2003; 23 years ago (North East Line); 8 October 2011; 15 years ago (Circle Line)
- Former names: World Trade Centre

Passengers
- June 2024: 45,982 per day

Services
Preceding station	Mass Rapid Transit	Following station
Terminus	North East Line	Outram Park towards Punggol Coast
Telok Blangah Clockwise	Circle Line	Keppel Anticlockwise
Telok Blangah towards Dhoby Ghaut	Circle Line	Keppel towards Prince Edward Road
Track layout
Location
- Location within Singapore Rail central area

HarbourFront MRT station is an underground Mass Rapid Transit (MRT) interchange station in Singapore. A station on the Circle Line (CCL) and terminus of the North East Line, it serves the HarbourFront area and Sentosa. Surrounding retail and commercial developments include VivoCity and the station is near HarbourFront Bus Interchange and the Singapore Cruise Centre.

The NEL station was first announced as World Trade Centre MRT station in March 1996 as one of the line's 16 stations. Its construction involved several road diversions and the opening of the drainage culverts. The NEL station was completed on 20 June 2003. The CCL platforms opened on 8 October 2011 along with Stages 4 and 5 of the line.

Reflecting the station's location by the Singapore Strait, the station concourse has an elliptical motif resembling a ship hull. The station features three artworks as part of the Art-in-Transit programme. The NEL platforms and concourse display a series of line-drawings by Ian Woo, while the CCL platforms feature Commuting Waves by Jason Ong and a set of art seats entitled Matrix.

== History ==
=== North East Line ===
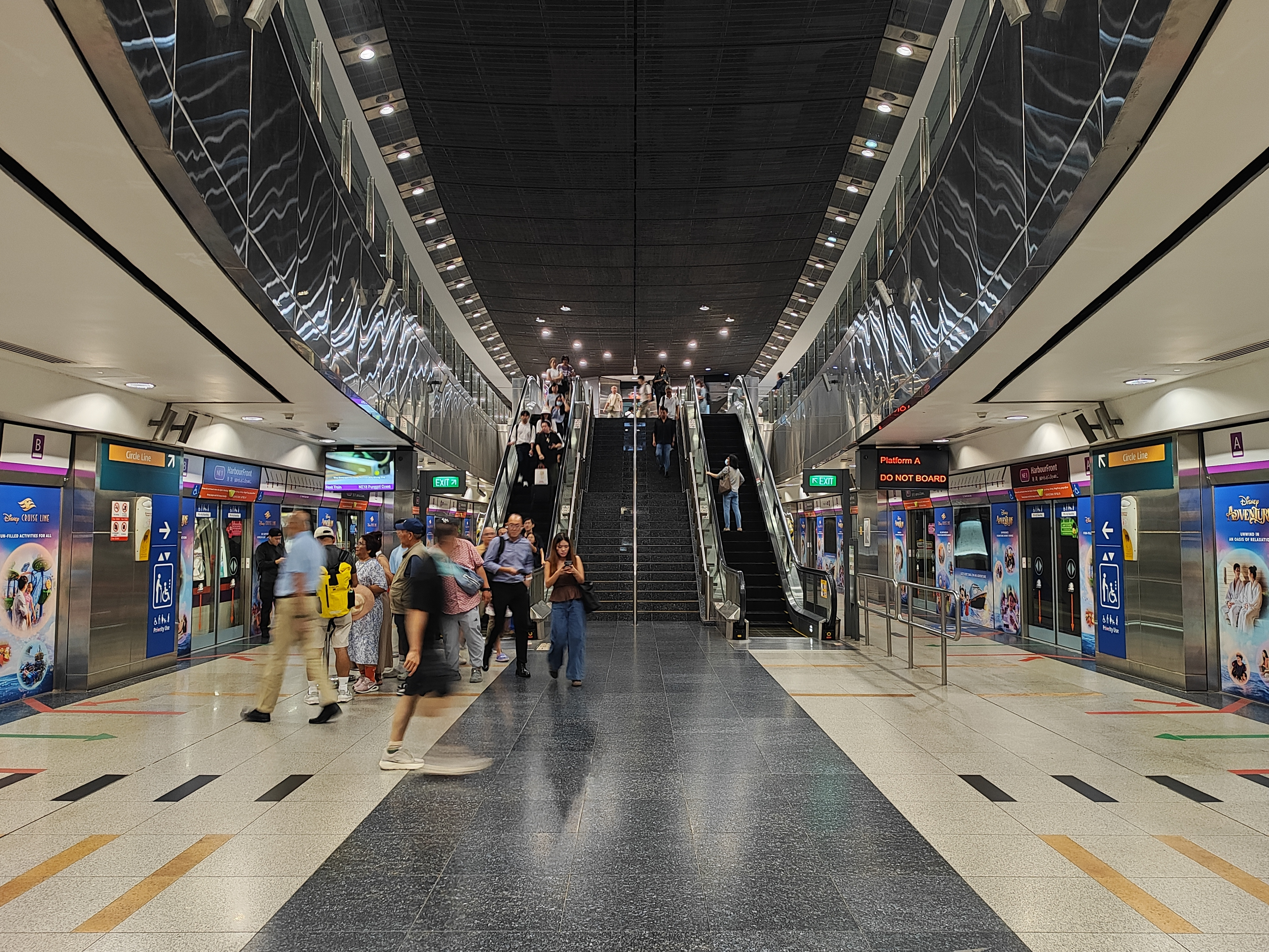
NEL platforms of the station

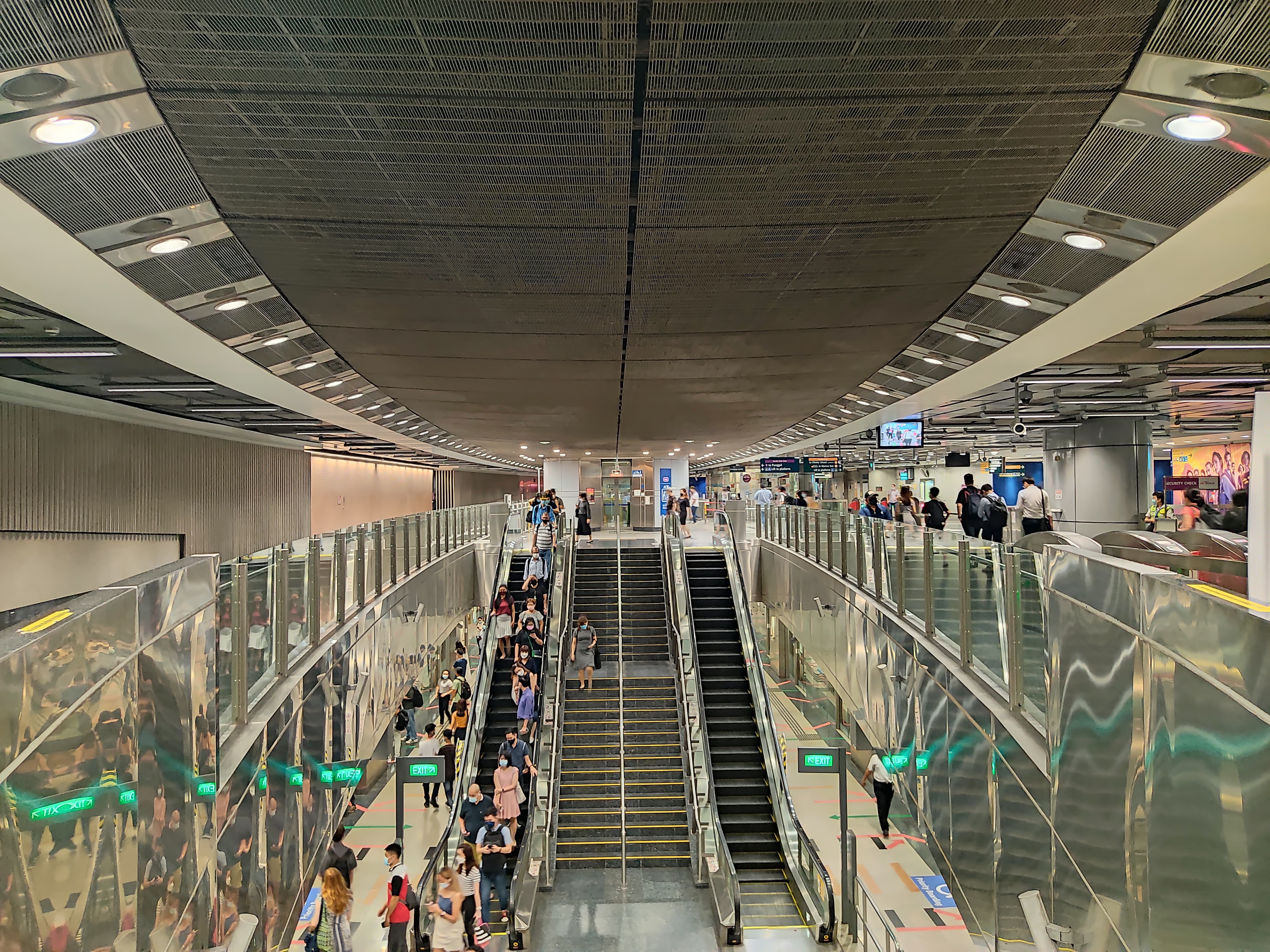
Concourse level of the station with the elliptical motif

In preliminary studies for the North East Line (NEL) in 1986, it was planned for the line to terminate at Outram Park station instead of HarbourFront. In a later study in 1995, the planned NEL was extended to serve World Trade Centre. After plans for the new line were approved by the government in January 1996, the station, then tentatively named World Trade Centre, was among the 16 NEL stations announced by communications minister Mah Bow Tan in March 1996.

The contract for constructing the station and tunnels was awarded to Hyundai Engineering & Construction at S$132.8 million (US$143 million in 2022) in September 1997. The scope of the contract included the widening of a section of Telok Blangah Road, alongside the construction of a three cell sidings tunnel and a crossover box. The new station was expected to boost retail and residential developments in the Telok Blangah area, which was known for the Keppel Harbour and associated industries. The Port of Singapore Authority (PSA) had cooperated with the Land Transport Authority (LTA) officials on redevelopment plans for the area.

The station box was constructed within a fill layer of loose clayey sand and firm sandy clay, which sits above the underlying Jurong Formation sedimentary rock. The site was excavated to a depth of 18.5 metres (61 ft), which required a temporary soldier pile wall for earth support, utilising sheetpile lagging in the upper soils and shotcrete lagging in the lower weathered rock. To minimise disruptions to surrounding businesses, the contractor used silent pilers when driving steel piles into the ground. These pilers created less noise and vibrations compared to conventional pilers.

Due to the station's location near the seashore, the contractor mitigated water seepage by injecting cement into the surrounding soil via jet grouting. Sheet piles were installed around the site, and tests were conducted to determine the amount of saltwater and groundwater at the site. (Note: These tests included a pumping test, which involved the pumping of a 300 mm (12 in) diameter well to measure actual rock mass permeability and real-time drawdown behavior prior to excavation. Four pneumatic piezometers were installed in rock and three water standpipes were installed in clay to track pore pressure changes and groundwater levels.) Although the highly fractured rock caused underdrainage of the overlying soil, the low rate of groundwater inflow allowed the contractor to manage water levels effectively using sump pumps. The groundwater drawdown and stabilisation occurred faster than expected; stress relief during excavation opened fissures in the Jurong Formation, increasing its permeability. This reduced water pressure in the underlying rock, allowing engineers to optimise and redesign the temporary strutting system. (Note: A five-level strutting system was originally designed, but field monitoring revealed that loads on the lower two levels were overpredicted. As such, the fifth strut level was unnecessary for excavation destabilisation.)

The contractor initially considered rerouting the drainage system that channelled water to the sea but that was financially unfeasible. Instead, the culverts that crossed the site were cut open and diverted into temporary steel culverts or pipes that did not obstruct the works. Due to the limited space, two of the World Trade Centre's exhibition halls were demolished to facilitate construction works.

The Telok Blangah Road was also being upgraded with a new vehicular overpass. Hence, the LTA's road and rail project teams had to coordinate to maximise the efficiency of both projects. The rail project team had constructed 10 viaduct foundations for the road section that crosses the station site. At the same time, the contractor had to maintain the traffic flow in the area – not just for visitors to the World Trade Centre, but to prevent delays and disruptions to port operations nearby. The traffic was diverted to temporary steel decking that ran over the construction site. The roads were diverted at least 30 times for the station's construction.

The contractors (Shimizu Corporation, Koh Brothers and Dillingham Construction International) for the 2.16 km (1.34 mi) of tunnelling works between this station and the adjacent Outram Park station had to monitor for any ground movement for the shophouses and ensure operations for the Malaysian rail service was not affected. A dual-mode tunnel boring machine was used to deal with the varying soil conditions along the tunnel route.

HarbourFront station opened on 20 June 2003 with the rest of the NEL stations. In October 2012, the LTA announced that the NEL overrun tunnel would be extended by 50 m (160 ft). Completed at the end of 2014 at a cost of S$8.2 million (US$6.6 million), the extension is to facilitate quicker turnarounds for southbound trains.

As part of a joint emergency preparedness exercise by the LTA and train operators SBS Transit and SMRT, security screenings were held at the station on 2 August 2019. The screening machines deployed for the exercise include mass screening devices and X-Ray machines to check for possible threat items like firearms. Such exercises were conducted to test established response protocols and maintain vigilance for quicker and more effective responses during emergencies and heightened security situations.

=== Circle Line ===
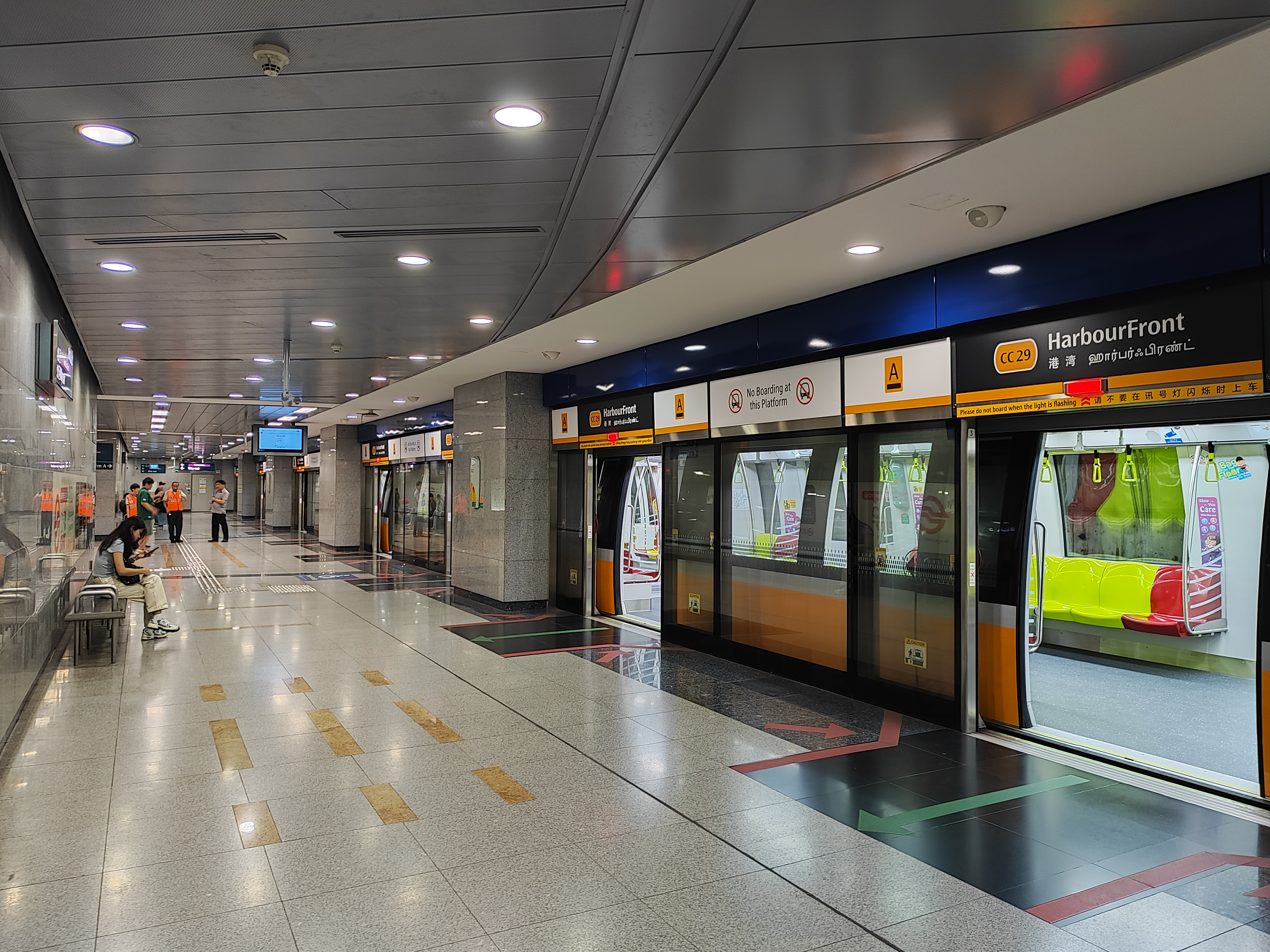
CCL platform level of the station

In 2001, Yeo Cheow Tong, the communications minister, announced that the Circle Line (CCL) would serve the HarbourFront area. On 12 December 2003, the LTA confirmed that HarbourFront station would interchange with the CCL and the new platforms would be constructed as part of CCL Stage 5 (CCL5). This segment consisted of five stations from West Coast station to this station.

The contract for the fitting out works for the CCL station and connecting tunnels was awarded to SembCorp Engineers & Constructors Pte Ltd (SembCorp E&C) at S$335.38 million (US$198.7 million) in October 2004. The contract include civil, architectural and building works for the West Coast, Pasir Panjang, Alexandra and Telok Blangah stations, alongside 3.4 km (2.1 mi) of twin bored tunnels and 640 m (700 yd) of cut and cover tunnels.

To facilitate construction works for the CCL platforms, Platform A of the NEL station was closed on 30 October 2005. Trains on the NEL from Punggol station terminated at Outram Park station, while a special shuttle train was launched for services between Outram Park and HarbourFront. In December 2009, structure works for the CCL station were completed, with backfilling in progress. As announced by transport minister Lui Tuck Yew during his visit to the CCL4 and 5 stations on 1 August 2011, the CCL platforms began revenue service on 8 October that year.

On 17 January 2013, transport minister Lui Tuck Yew announced that the CCL would be extended from HarbourFront station to Marina Bay station as part of CCL Stage 6. Tunnelling works between this station and Keppel station began on 25 July 2019, and were completed in August 2020.

== Station details ==
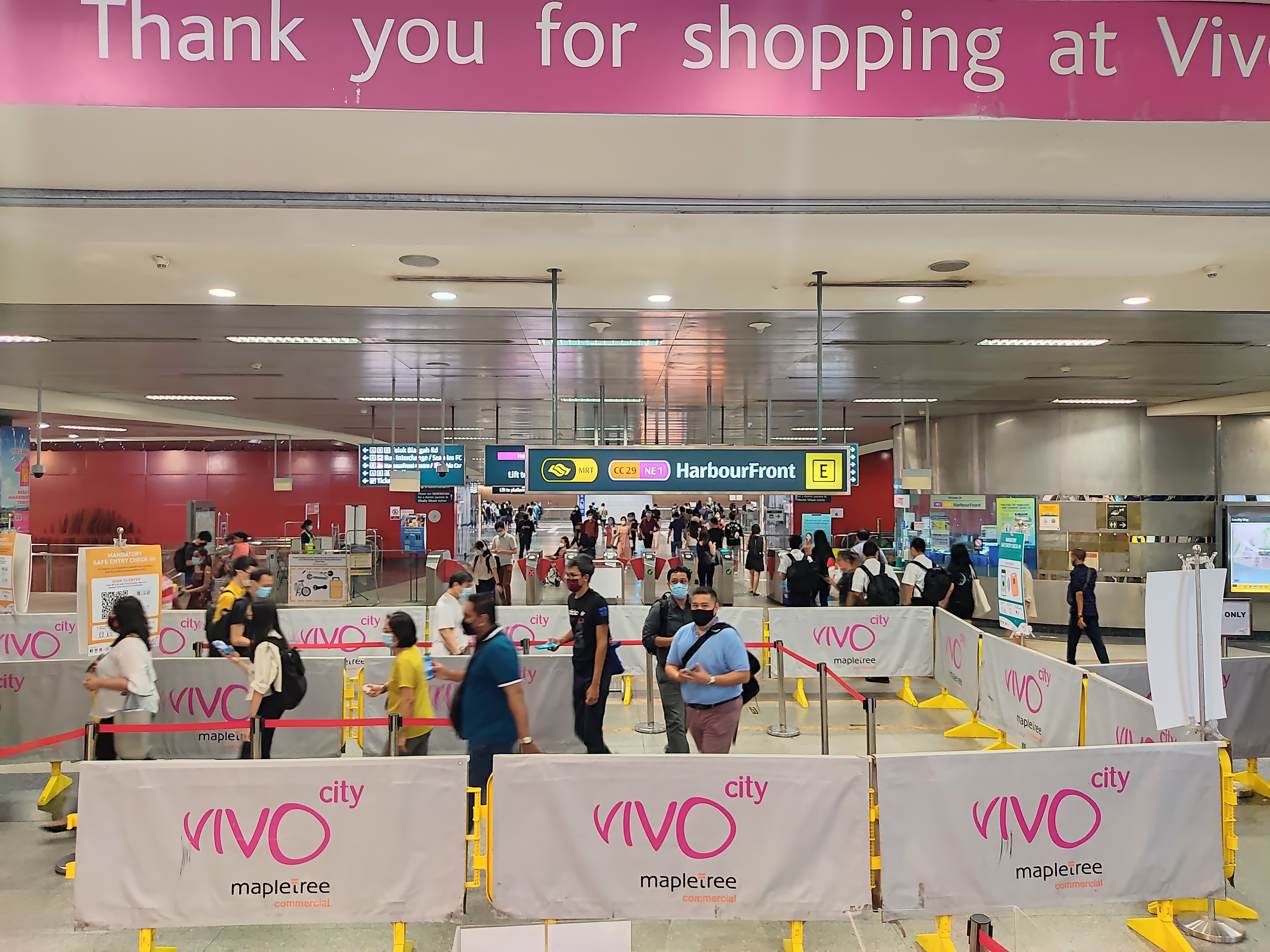
Exit E of the station leads directly into VivoCity

HarbourFront station is the terminus of the NEL and a station on the CCL; its official station code is NE1/CC29. On the NEL, the adjacent station is Outram Park station. On the CCL, it is between Telok Blangah and Keppel stations. Designed by Architects61, the station concourse has an elliptical motif resembling a ship hull, alongside floor patterns and the artwork that reflects the station's location by the Singapore Strait.

The station is underneath Telok Blangah Road and has five entrances. HarbourFront station serves various commercial and retail developments including VivoCity. It is the closest MRT station to the tourist island of Sentosa. The station is also near HarbourFront Bus Interchange, Seah Im Food Centre, Singapore Cruise Centre and Mount Faber Park, along with the cultural sites of Temenggong Mosque and St James Power Station.

The NEL station is designated as a Civil Defence (CD) shelter. It is designed to accommodate at least 7,500 people and can withstand airstrikes and chemical attacks. Equipment essential for the operations in the CD shelter is mounted on shock absorbers to prevent damage during a bombing. When electrical supply to the shelter is disrupted, there are backup generators to keep operations going. The shelter has dedicated built-in decontamination chambers and dry toilets with collection bins that send human waste out of the shelter.

The NEL and CCL platforms are wheelchair-accessible. A tactile system, consisting of tiles with rounded or elongated raised studs, guides visually impaired commuters through the station, with dedicated tactile routes that connect the station entrances to the platforms or between either line's platforms. Wide fare gates allow easier access for wheelchair users into the station.

== Public artworks ==
The station displays four artworks; three as part of the MRT network's Art-in-Transit programme – a showcase of public artworks on the MRT network and one as part of SMRT's Comic Connect display, a public art display of heritage-themed murals.

=== Enigmatic Appearances ===
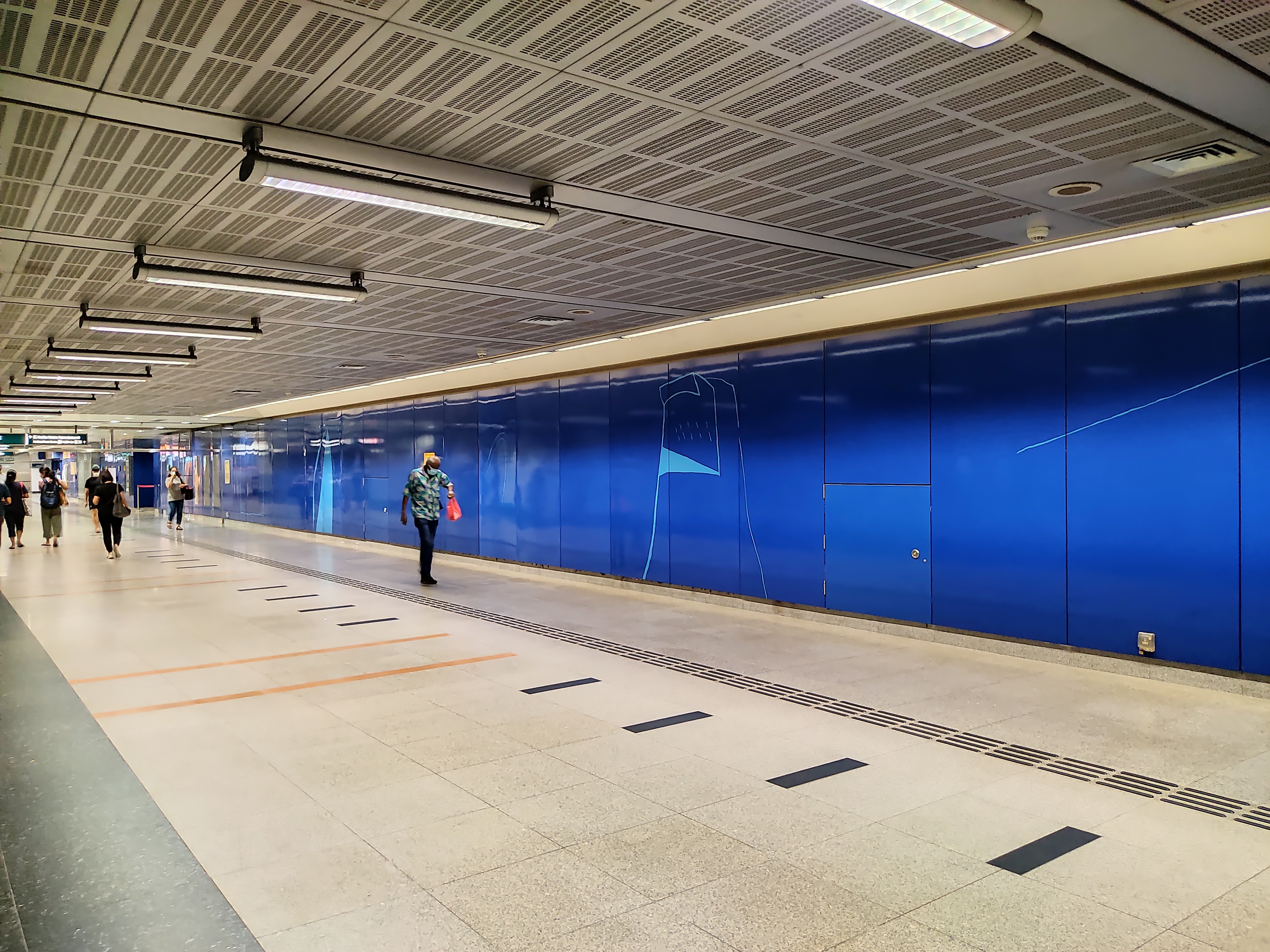
The NEL artwork along the station concourse

Enigmatic Appearances by Ian Woo is a series of line-drawings depicting various sea creatures, ships and clouds in minimalist style. Painted on 60 blue vitreous enamel wall panels, the work was intended to reflect the station's maritime theme and its location near the port. With its "dream-like" quality, the figures are in fragments dispersed throughout the station, allowing commuters in the station to slowly perceive the artwork over time. A set of footprints on the walls at the end of the NEL platforms references the station's role as the terminus of the NEL.

Inspirations for the artwork were derived from what Woo captured in his visit to the HarbourFront area. In addition to taking photos of the area, he wrote about his experiences during his trip. Creating the work required him to co-operate with the station's architects, since the LTA intended to integrate art with the station's design. Although Woo was used to working independently, he learnt to articulate his thoughts and intentions with the architectural team, with the help of NEL art coordinator Constance Sheares. The collaboration allowed Woo and the architectural team to have deeper insights into each other's works. While retaining his creative freedom over the work, Woo ensured that the work was compatible with the technical aspects of the station design.

After the architects and the Art Review Panel approved his line drawings, the figures were painted and enlarged. This process took place across two weeks, with some revisions made due to the artist's dissatisfaction with some of the enlarged figures. The black-and-white figures were then coloured in blue at a vitreous enamel factory in England. Travelling to the factory to oversee the production process, Woo also gave further instructions and ensured the colours of the final product come out right.

=== Commuting Waves ===
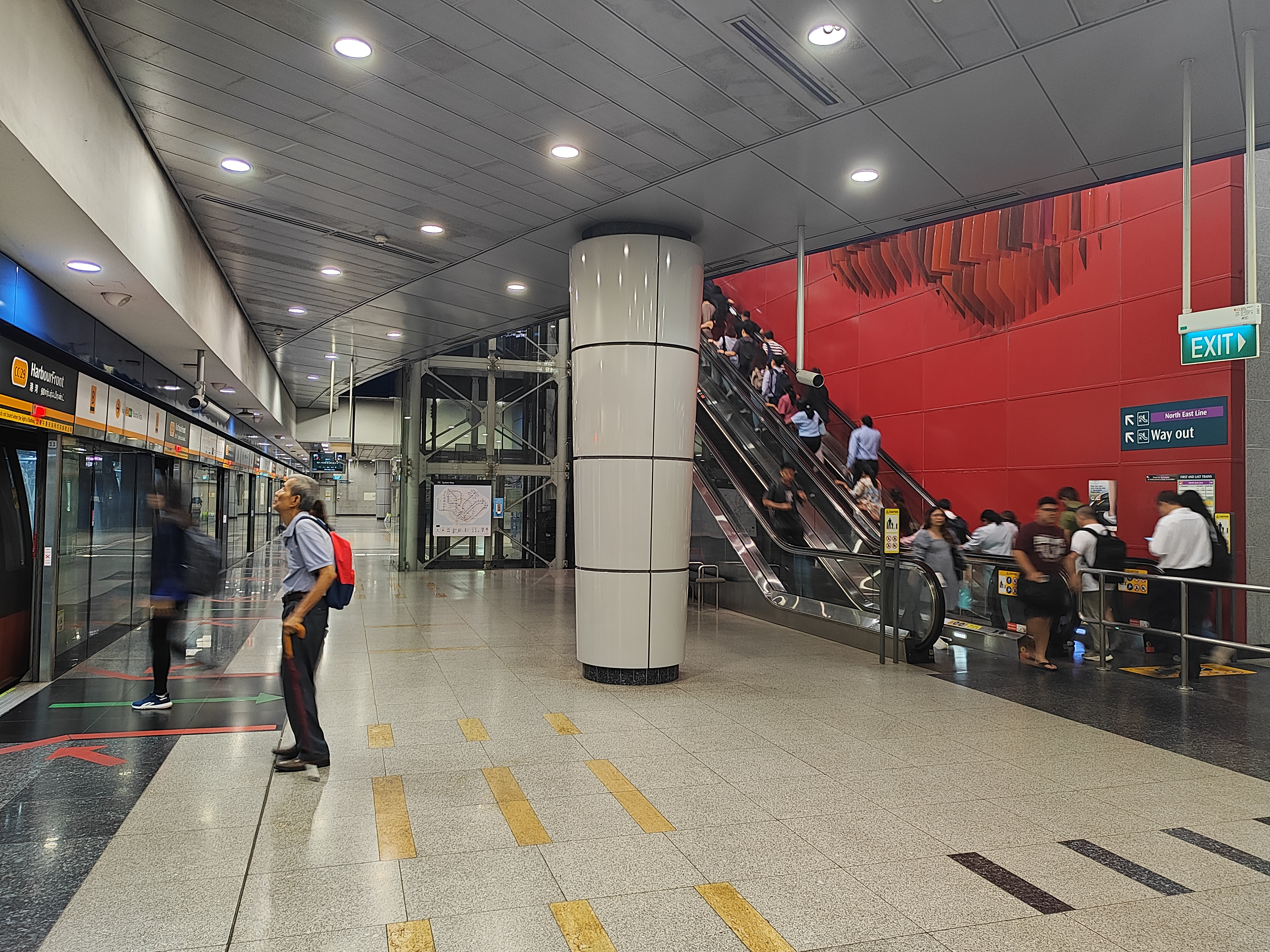
Platform B of the CCL station, with the artwork at the escalators

Displayed on the wall of the CCL platforms near the escalators, Commuting Waves by Jason Ong is a pair of sculptures depicting 3D waveforms. The waveforms were derived from commuter traffic at the station, with the positions of the glass 'fins' representing the passenger volume and train frequencies. The work is intended to reflect the rhythm and flow of human activities, which linked the work to the station's location, human values and the MRT system.

The work was created through indeterminacy, inspired by experimental music of John Cage. The inspiration came when Ong was researching soundwaves (waveforms being a distinctive element of the waterfront area), and intended to create the waveforms based on the station's environment. Two assistants recorded the train frequency and passenger traffic on a randomly selected weekday and weekend. The artist noted that the data was only derived from commuters on the NEL, since the CCL was not yet operational when the work was created. Nevertheless, he concluded that the graph shapes would remain similar if he were to include passenger numbers from the CCL.

The graphs had to be transformed into sculptures that are "aesthetically pleasing". The protrusion and spacing of each "fin" were dependent on the passenger traffic and train frequency respectively. Using phase shift, a concept by minimalist composer Steve Reich, the data lines were spaced out from the original graphs. Each alternating frequency was split into different layers that spread across the walls. The eventual shapes of the waveforms were derived from the freehand outlines of the graphs. These outlines were also mirrored to produce the shapes.

The sculptures are in red, which not only reflects the human rhythm but also complements the CCL station's theme, contrasting with the NEL's blue theme. While initially planned to use metal shapes, upon seeing the portfolio of the production team, Ong changed to glass. Ong grouped the fins into sets of six and used serialism to give each fin a different red "tone". The glass used were opaque edged, but as Ong did not like how it appeared, it was changed to transparent edged. An idea to create an illusion of wave moment was discarded due to various unresolved technical difficulties of getting the appropriate tone and colours for the illusion.

=== Matrix ===
The CCL platforms feature a set of "art seats" entitled Matrix. Though the platform seats are intended to be works of art, they are designed to remain functional and practical. This work by Lui Honfay and Yasmine Chan, along with Rain, was selected through the International Art Seats Design Competition in 2006. Matrix consists of a series of benches engraved with the station name in a dot-matrix style on the seat surface. The dot-matrix system was adopted as it was flexible enough to be mass-produced for use in many stations. The intriguing combination of signage and seat "impressed" the judges who awarded it the top prize.

=== Comic Connect ===
There is a heritage themed mural in the CCL station created by local artists Monica Lim, Kevin Lee, and Chris Lim as a part of SMRT's Comic Connect display. The mural features landmarks such as the Tang Gah Beo Taoist Temple, Catholic Church of St Teresa, Singapore Cruise Centre, and the Keppel terminal of the Port of Singapore.
