= Seah Im Food Centre =

Hawker centre in Bukit Merah, Singapore

- 声音路熟食中心 (Chinese); Pusat Makanan Seah Im (Malay) சீ இம் உணவு மையம் (Tamil)
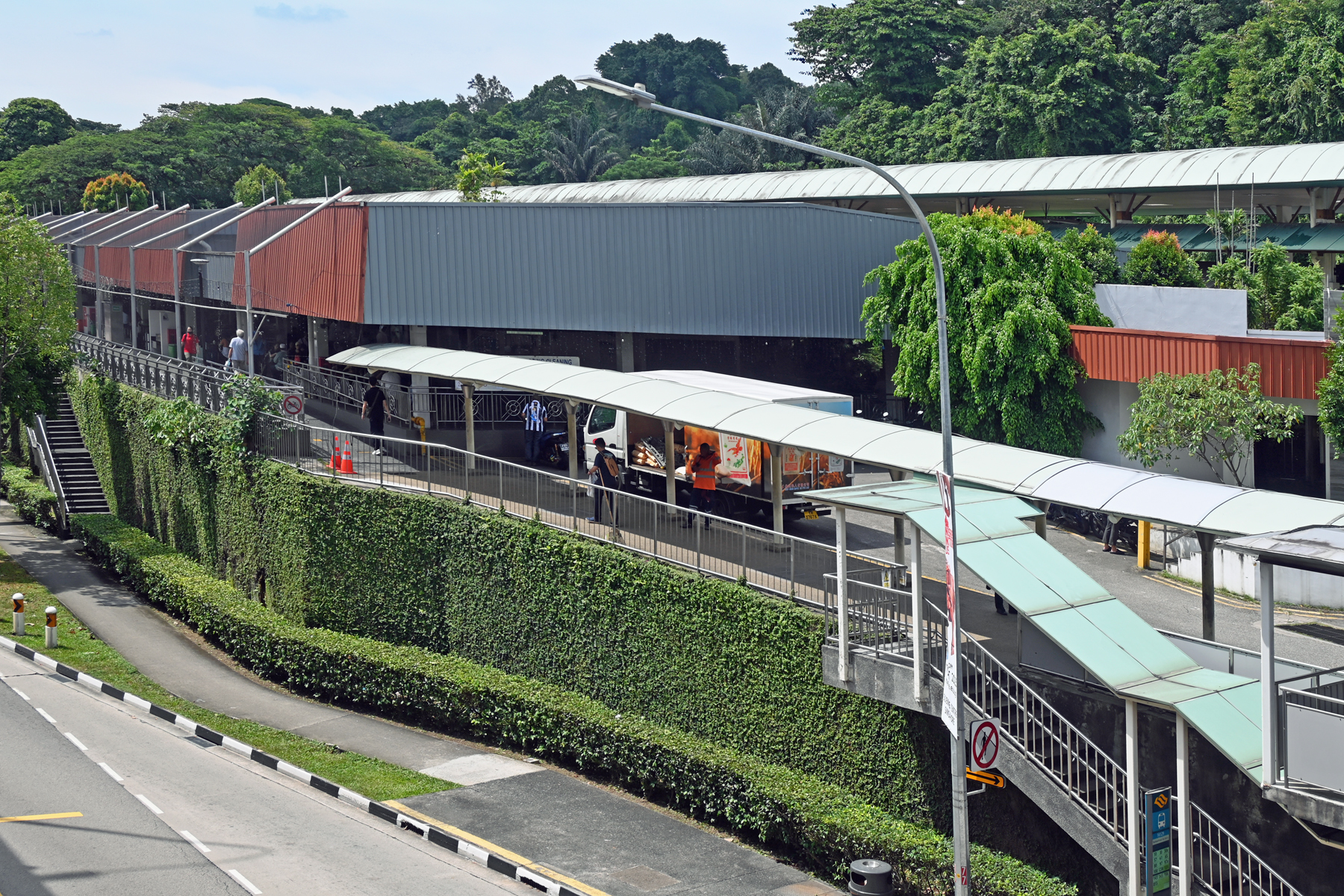
- Seah Im Food Centre as viewed from Telok Blangah Road in 2025
- Interactive map of the Seah Im Food Centre area
- Alternative names: Seah Im Road Food Centre

General information
- Location: Bukit Merah, Singapore, 2 Seah Im Road; 099114
- Coordinates: 1°16′00″N 103°49′09″E
- Opened: November 1984; 41 years ago
- Renovated: 13 March 2023; 3 years ago
- Landlord: Singapore Land Authority

Technical details
- Floor area: 2,046.044 m^{2} (22,023.43 sq ft)

Renovating team
- Architect: BHATCH Architects
- Main contractor: QXY Resources

Other information
- Number of stores: 60
- Public transit: CC29 NE1 HarbourFront

Seah Im Food Centre is a hawker centre in Bukit Merah, located along Seah Im Road. The hawker centre is directly connected to HarbourFront Bus Interchange and HarbourFront MRT station.

== History ==
In 1975, the Port of Singapore Authority (PSA) acquired land in Seah Im Road to develop the port, and in 1983, construction of Seah Im Food Centre began. Situated opposite the World Trade Centre (now known as HarbourFront Centre), the hawker centre opened in November 1984 with a total of 46 stalls. In the beginning, most stalls served Indian and Muslim dishes, such as nasi padang and murtabak. Tenders were published to invite more hawkers to occupy vacant stalls and sell Chinese dishes, such as wonton noodles and char kway teow.

From 1987 to 1990, tenders for non-food stalls were published. Permitted items to be sold included rental of video tapes, flowers, and souvenirs.

Upon the privatisation of PSA, the hawker centre was returned to the state in 1997, and managed by the Singapore Land Authority. Along with the opening of the HarbourFront MRT station, Seah Im completed refurbishment works and reopened in June 2003.

On 1 September 2022, the hawker centre was closed for major renovations. As the renovations were expected to last for 6 months, some hawkers chose to retire, while others decided to rest or focus on their other stalls. As part of the renovation, the tiles were replaced, and the ceiling was raised higher. On 13 March 2023, Seah Im reopened with 44 cooked food and drink stalls, and 16 non-food stalls. Another six cooked food stalls and 10 non-food stalls were vacant and became available for bidding from April 2023.

== Present day ==
Seah Im Food Centre is known for having affordable prices, serving officer workers, tourists and residents in the vicinity. While most hawker centres in Singapore are managed by the National Environment Agency, the hawker centre remains as the only hawker centre managed by the Singapore Land Authority.

== See also ==
- Hawker centre
- Singaporean cuisine
