= Pasir Panjang MRT station =

Mass Rapid Transit station in Singapore

Pasir Panjang CC26 巴西班让 பாசிர் பாஞ்சாங்
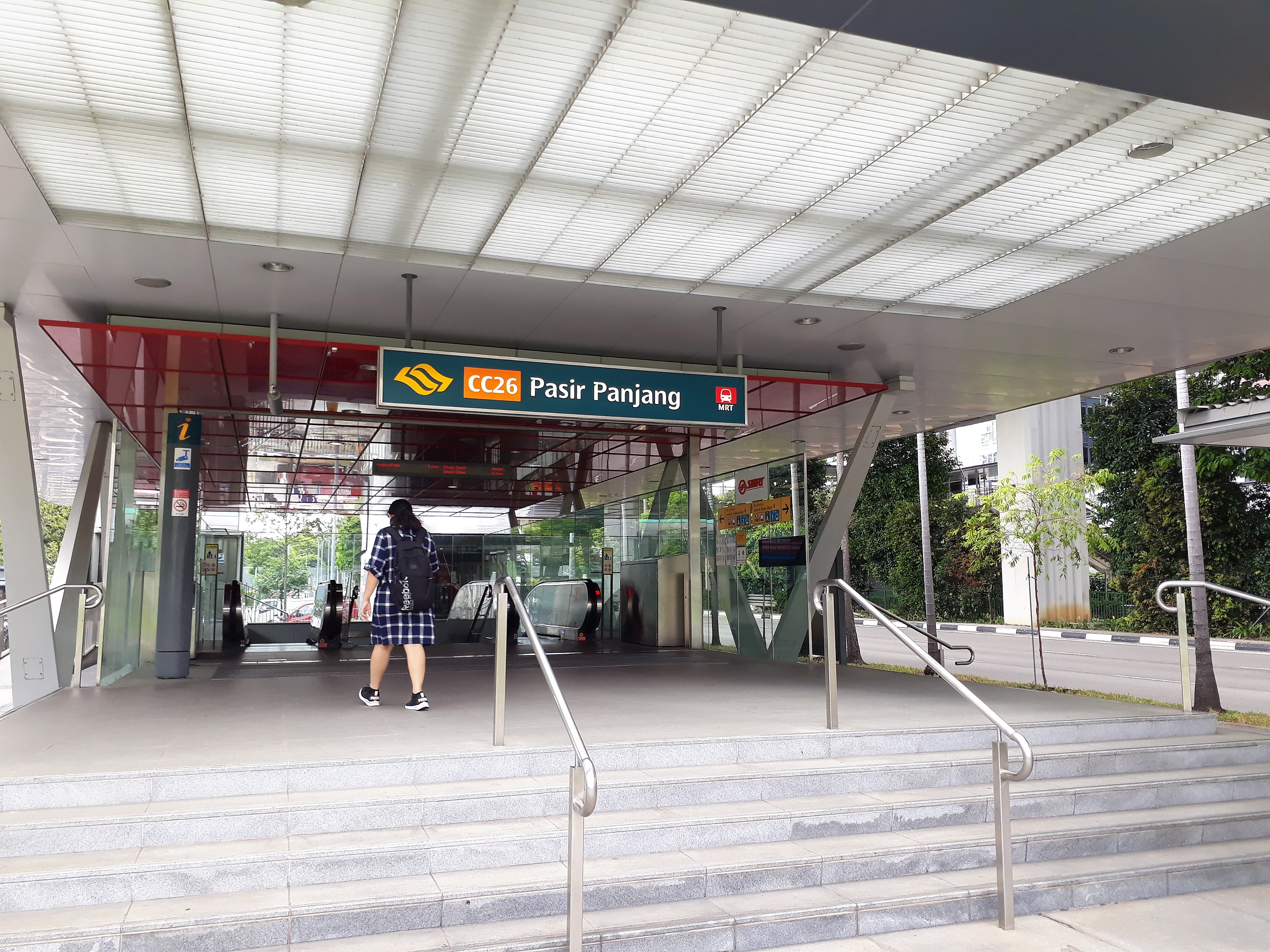
- Exit A of Pasir Panjang MRT station.

General information
- Location: 119 Pasir Panjang Road, Singapore 117424
- Coordinates: 01°16′34″N 103°47′29″E
- System: Mass Rapid Transit (MRT) station
- Owner: Land Transport Authority
- Operator: SMRT Trains
- Line: Circle Line
- Platforms: 2 (1 island platform)
- Tracks: 2
- Connections: Bus, Taxi

Construction
- Structure type: Underground
- Platform levels: 1
- Accessible: Yes

Other information
- Station code: PPJ

History
- Opened: 8 October 2011; 15 years ago
- Former names: Bukit Chandu

Passengers
- June 2024: 4,635 per day

Services
Preceding station	Mass Rapid Transit	Following station
Haw Par Villa Clockwise	Circle Line	Labrador Park Anticlockwise
Haw Par Villa towards Dhoby Ghaut	Circle Line	Labrador Park towards Prince Edward Road
Track layout
Location
- Location within Singapore Rail central area

Pasir Panjang MRT station is an underground Mass Rapid Transit (MRT) station on the Circle Line. As the name suggests, it is located in Pasir Panjang at the southern part of Queenstown planning area, Singapore. This station is situated underneath Pasir Panjang Road and Labrador Viaduct (West Coast Highway), next to the Pasir Panjang Food Centre, Currency House and Pasir Panjang container terminal. It is also near the Reflections at Bukit Chandu, a museum near the site of the Battle of Pasir Panjang.

== History ==
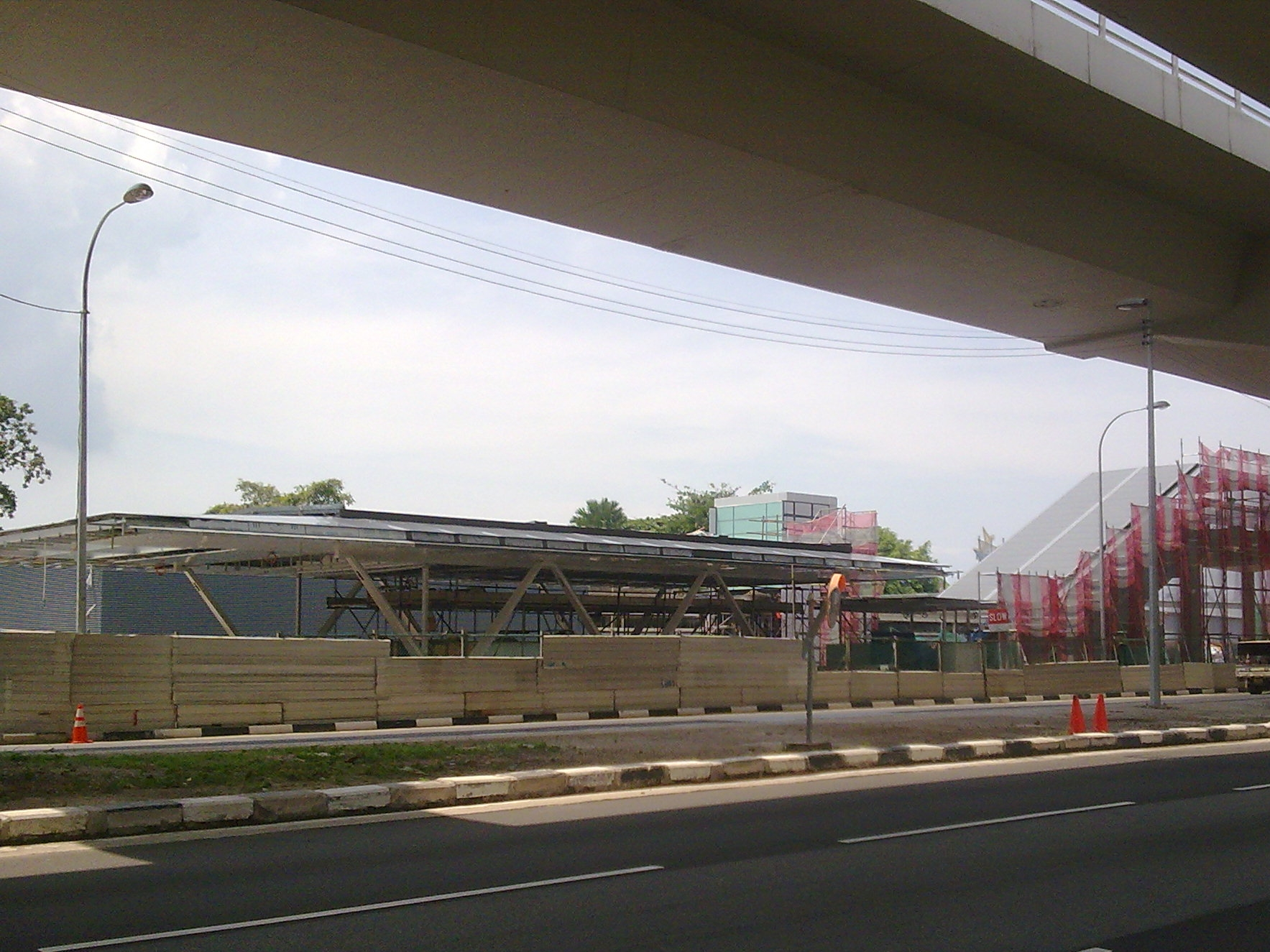
The station under construction.

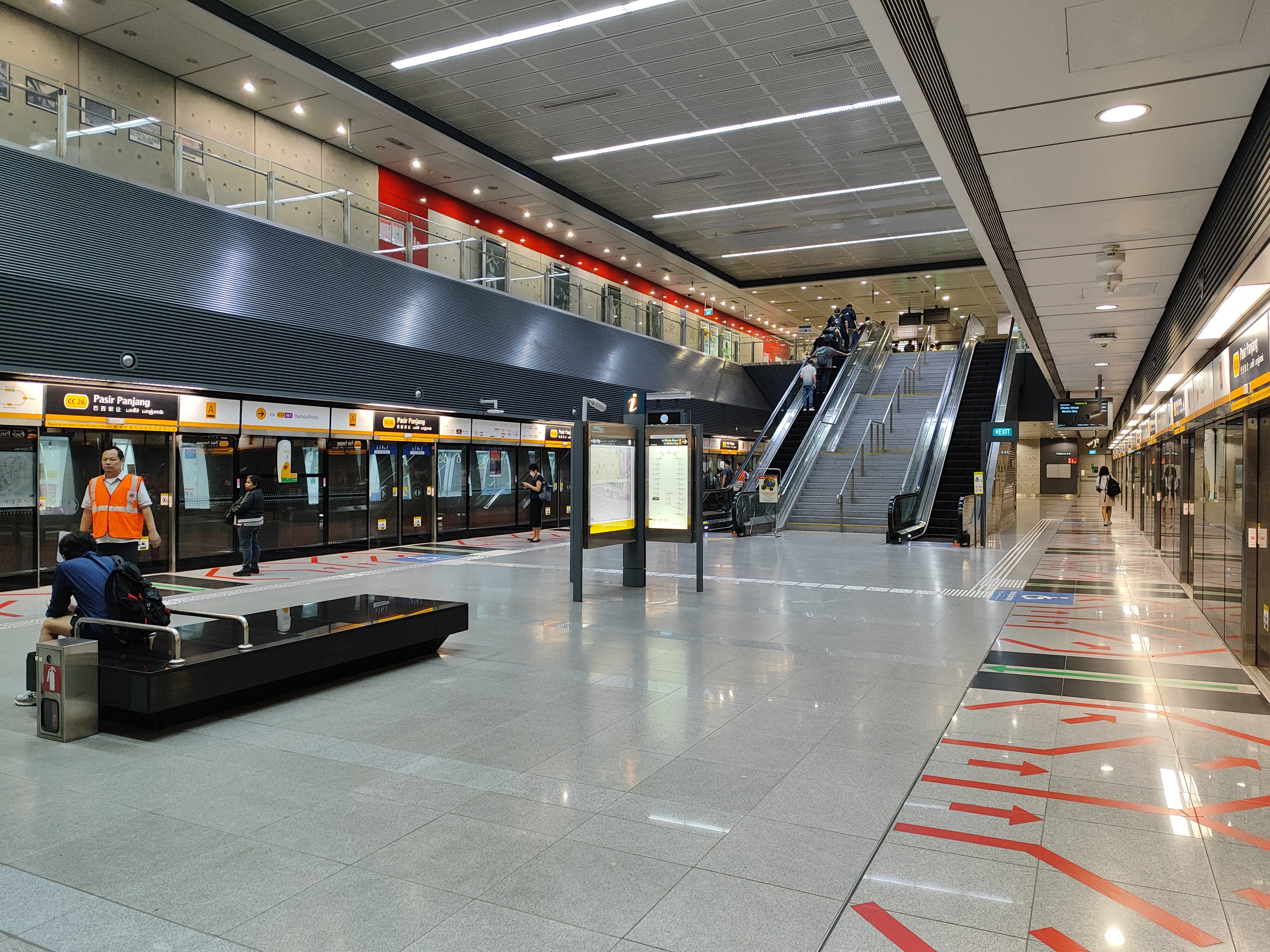
Platform level

The station opened on 8 October 2011, as announced in August of that year.

== Art in Transit ==
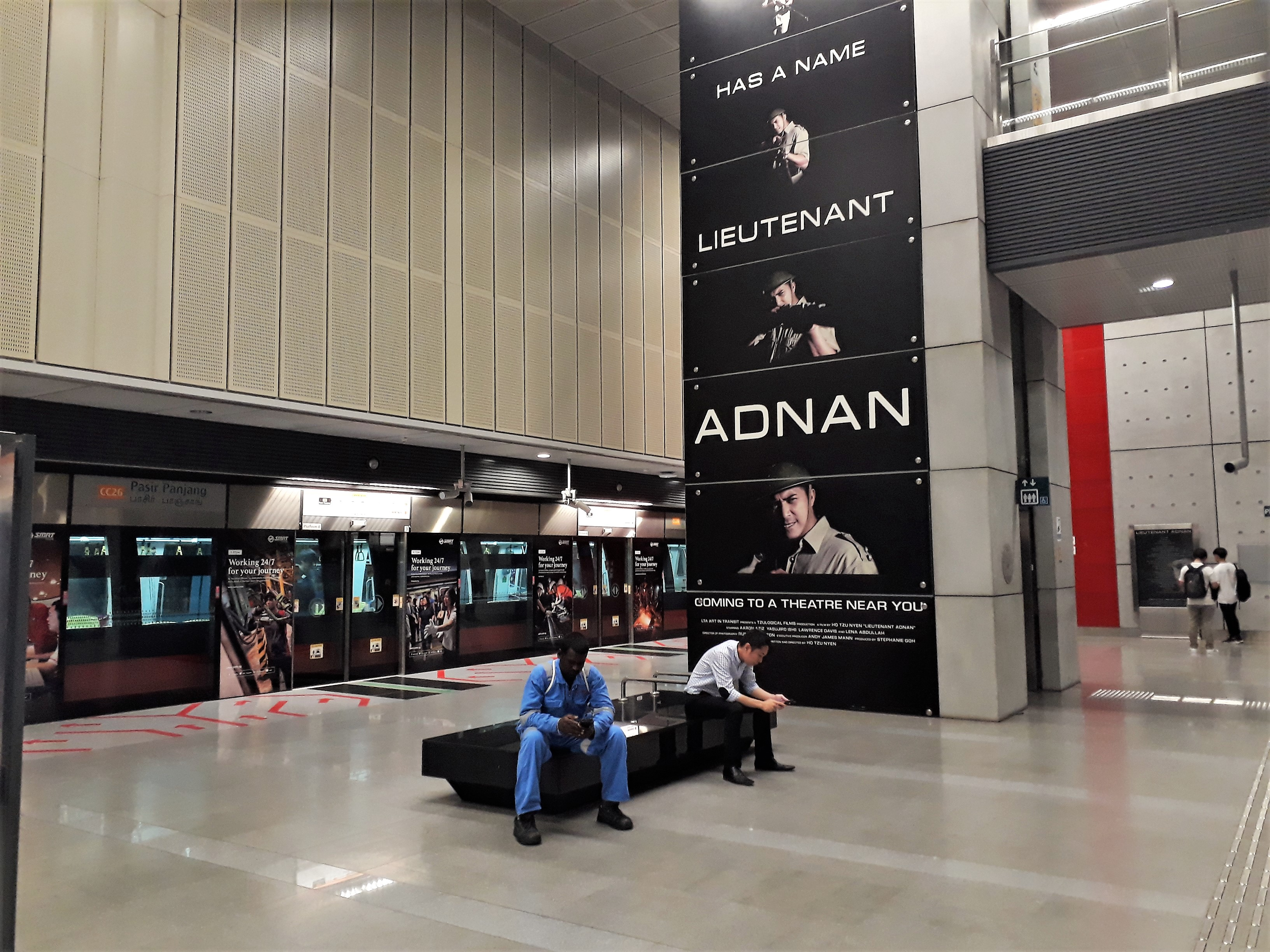
Artwork on the lift shaft viewed from the platforms.

The artwork featured in this station is Lieutenant Adnan by Ho Tzu Nyen, installed under the Art in Transit programme. Located on the lift shaft in the station and around the station are mock posters for a fictional movie about Lieutenant Adnan bin Saidi (played by Singapore actor Aaron Aziz), a real-life war hero who fought in the Battle of Pasir Panjang during World War II.
