= Haw Par Villa MRT station =

Mass Rapid Transit station in Singapore

Haw Par Villa CC25 虎豹别墅 ஹா பர் வில்லா
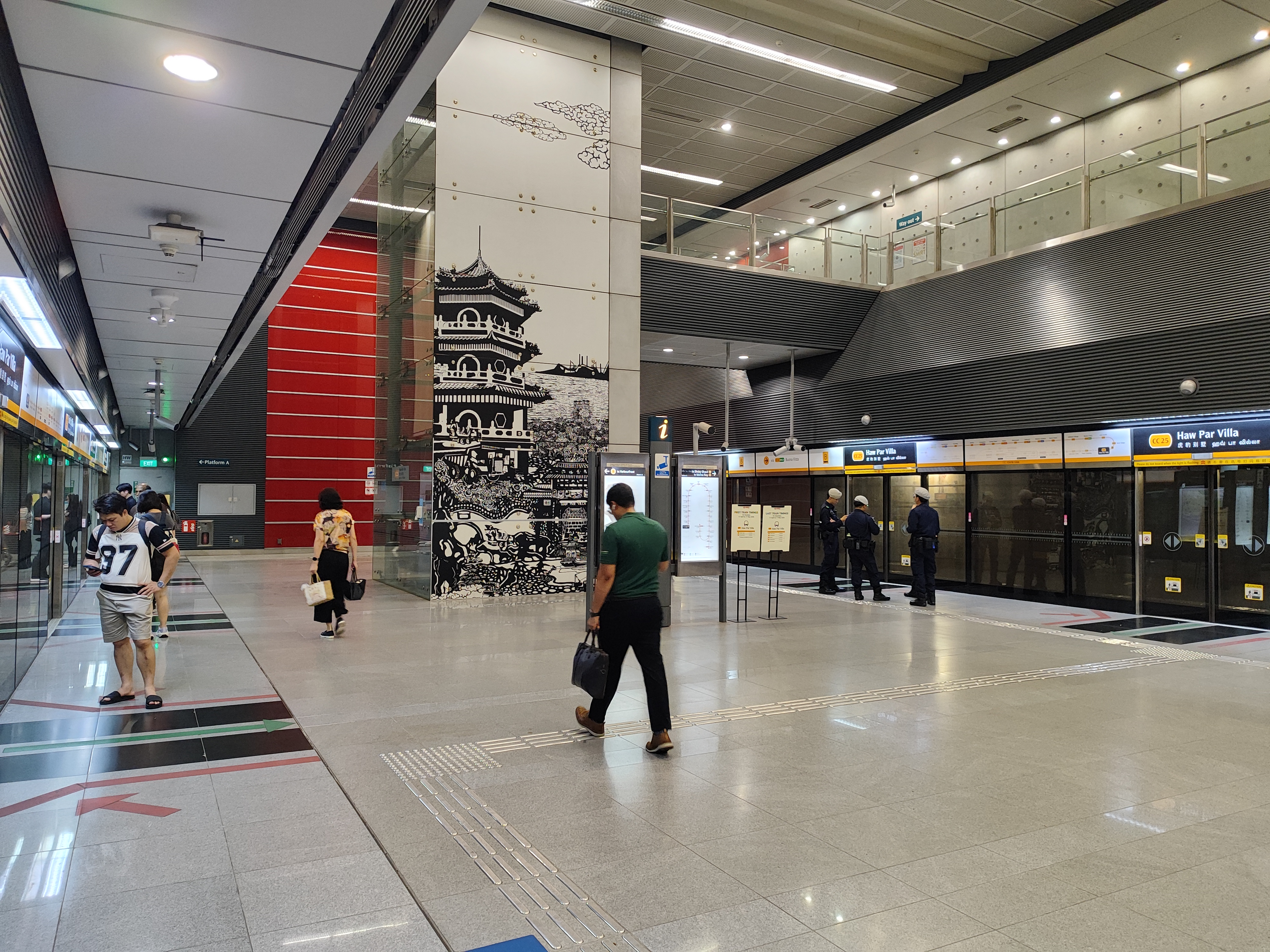
- Platform level of Haw Par Villa MRT station

General information
- Location: 270 Pasir Panjang Road, Singapore 117396
- Coordinates: 01°16′58″N 103°46′54″E
- System: Mass Rapid Transit (MRT) station
- Owner: Land Transport Authority
- Operator: SMRT Trains
- Line: Circle Line
- Platforms: 2 (1 island platform)
- Tracks: 2
- Connections: Bus, Taxi

Construction
- Structure type: Underground
- Platform levels: 1
- Accessible: Yes

Other information
- Station code: HPV

History
- Opened: 8 October 2011; 15 years ago
- Former names: West Coast

Passengers
- June 2024: 6,188 per day

Services
Preceding station	Mass Rapid Transit	Following station
Kent Ridge Clockwise	Circle Line	Pasir Panjang Anticlockwise
Kent Ridge towards Dhoby Ghaut	Circle Line	Pasir Panjang towards Prince Edward Road
Track layout
Location
- Location within Singapore Rail central area

Haw Par Villa MRT station is an underground Mass Rapid Transit (MRT) station on the Circle Line (CCL) in Queenstown, Singapore. Located underneath West Coast Highway and Pasir Panjang Road, the station serves the nearby Haw Par Villa, alongside the Pasir Panjang Wholesale Centre.

Initially planned to be a shell station tentatively named West Coast, in 2008, the station was announced to be opened along with Stages 4 and 5 of the CCL stations. The station opened in 2011. A West Coast Extension of the Jurong Region Line (JRL) from Pandan Reservoir to this station was planned. However, it was announced in March 2025 that the JRL would terminate at Kent Ridge station instead. The station features an Art-in-Transit artwork Eroclamation by Tan Wee Lit.

== History ==
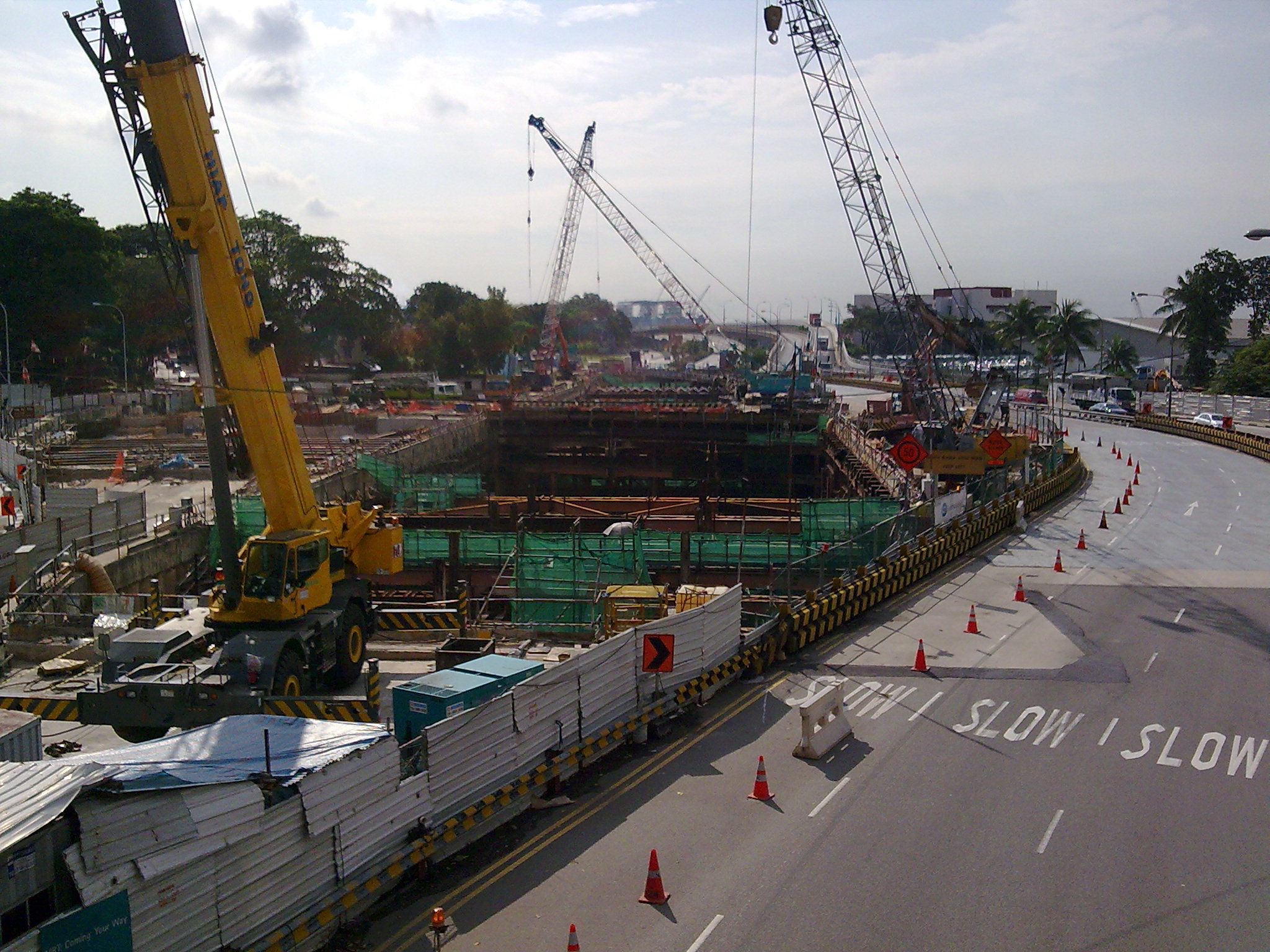
Construction site of the station in December 2008

When the Circle Line (CCL) was initially planned, this station, tentatively named "West Coast", was planned to be a shell station. The station was to be opened only when the surroundings were more developed. The contract for the construction of the station's structural provisions was awarded to SembCorp Engineers & Constructors Pte Ltd (SembCorp E&C) at S$335.38 million (US$198.7 million) in October 2004. The contract include civil, architectural and building works for the Pasir Panjang, Alexandra, Telok Blangah and HarbourFront stations, alongside 3.4 kilometres (2.1 miles) of twin bored tunnels and 640 metres (700 yd) of cut and cover tunnels.

The station was later announced to be opened with the Stage 4 and 5 CCL stations in 2008, and was renamed to "Haw Par Villa" through a public poll. The station opened on 8 October 2011.

=== Proposed JRL Interchange ===
On 25 August 2015, transport minister Lui Tuck Yew announced the possibility of extending the Jurong Region Line (JRL) from Pandan Reservoir to connect with the CCL at this station via the Pasir Panjang area. The extension would improve connections between the western part of Singapore and the Central Business District. If built, the extension would be completed around 2030. Feasibility studies were carried out from 2019 to 2022.

On 5 March 2025, transport minister Chee Hong Tat announced that the West Coast Extension would go ahead. However, the JRL would terminate at Kent Ridge station instead.

== Details ==
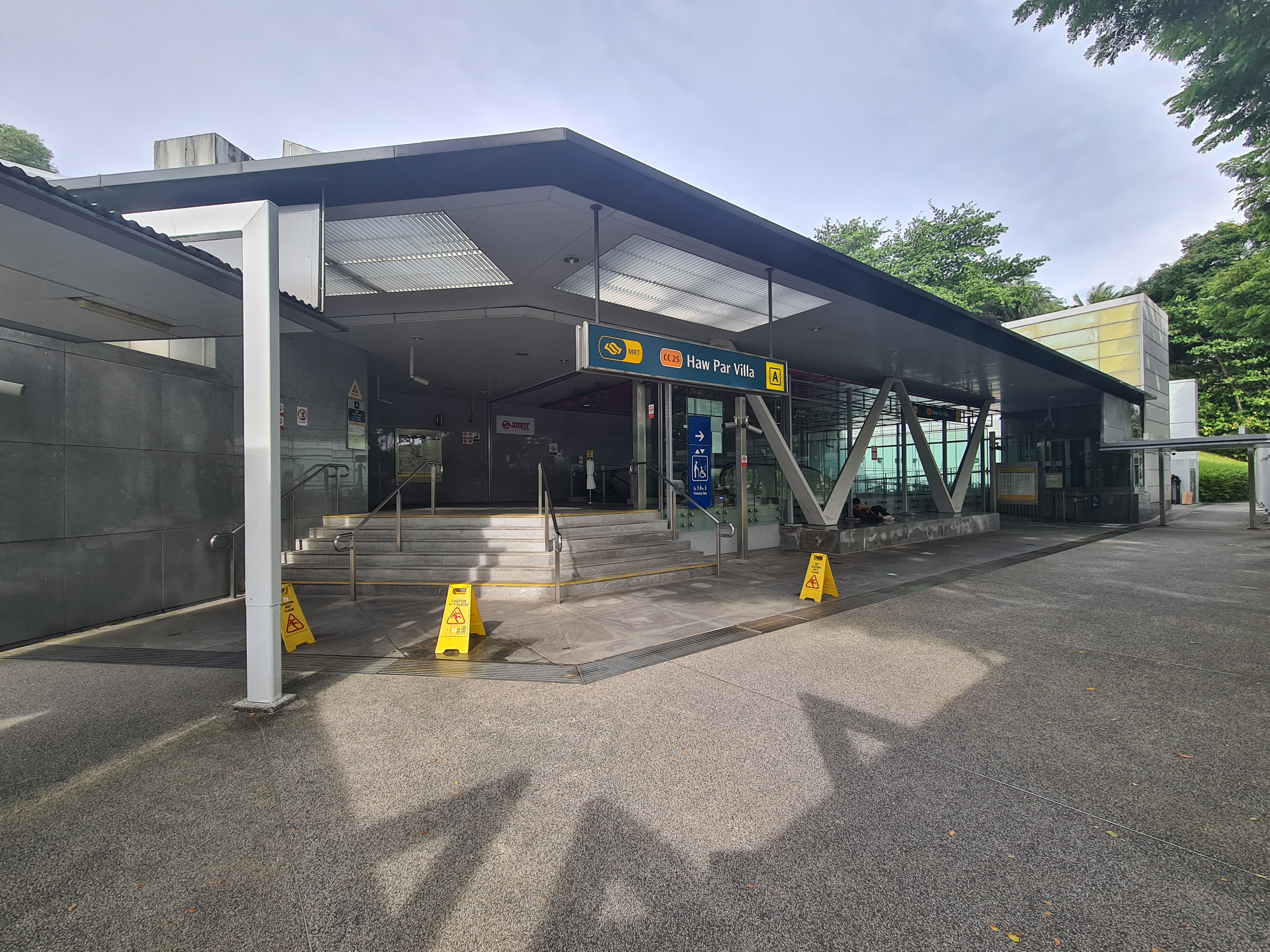
Exit A of the station

Haw Par Villa station serves the CCL and is between the Kent Ridge and Pasir Panjang stations. The official station code is CC25. Being part of the CCL, the station is operated by SMRT Trains. The station operates between 5:30 am and 12:15 am, with trains running every 5 to 7 minutes in both directions daily. The station is located underneath Pasir Panjang Road and West Coast Highway. Surrounding landmarks of the station include Haw Par Villa, PSA Vista, Pasir Panjang Wharves Building and Pasir Panjang Wholesale Centre.

Haw Par Villa station is one of eleven stations along the CCL designated as a Civil Defence (CD) shelter, which will be activated in times of national emergency. Apart from reinforced construction, the stations are designed and equipped with facilities to ensure the shelter environment is tolerable for all during shelter occupation. These facilities include protective blast doors, decontamination facilities, ventilation systems, power, water supply systems and a dry toilet system. The station is wheelchair accessible. A tactile system, consisting of tiles with rounded or elongated raised studs, guides visually impaired commuters through the station, with dedicated tactile routes that connect the station entrances to the platforms. Wider fare gates allow easier access for wheelchair users into the station.

=== Art in Transit ===
Haw Par Villa station showcases Eroclamation by Tan Wee Lit, commissioned as part of the MRT network's Art-in-Transit (AiT) Programme, a public art showcase which integrates artworks into the MRT network. It depicts a fictional black-and-white villa which incorporates landmarks in western Singapore, including the Chinese Garden pagoda, the entrance to Haw Par Villa and the industries of Jurong Island. In the background are construction vehicles contrasting against the peaceful landscape of the villa. Inspired by his discovery that the area had been reclaimed from a swamp, the artist intended for the artwork to reflect Haw Par Villa's themes of mortality and reincarnation. Similar to life and death, something has to be destroyed to make way for new developments. The artwork name 'Eroclamation' is a combination of the words 'erosion' and 'reclamation'.

Tan was intrigued by the 'strange amalgamation of cultures' in western Singapore, which hosted universities, army camps and workers' dormitories. This led him to include icons representing various landmarks in the area. Tan had considered depicting the nearby Japanese school, as well as birds representing Jurong Bird Park, but he dropped these elements as they did not stand out to him. The artwork was created in a paper-cut style and stitched together digitally, with a computer transforming the photographs into black motifs. The artwork was printed on vinyl and installed on the lift shaft.

== Notes and references ==
=== Bibliography ===
- Zhuang, Justin (2013). Art in transit: Circle Line MRT. Singapore: Land Transport Authority. ISBN 978-981-07-4982-8. OCLC 854958677.
- Cheong, Colin (2012). The Circle Line: Linking All Lines (PDF). Singapore: Land Transport Authority. ISBN 978-981-4342-02-5.
