= MHSS =

MHSS may refer to:

- Malayan High School of Science, a private secondary educational institution in Manila, Philippines
- Manakamana Higher Secondary School, a secondary school in Jorpati, Kathmandu, Nepal
- Mezhür Higher Secondary School, a private school in Kohima, Nagaland, India
- Monk's Hill Secondary School, a defunct secondary school in Newton, Singapore

== See also ==
- Minister of Health and Social Services (disambiguation)
