= Lorong Chuan MRT station =

Mass Rapid Transit station in Singapore

Lorong Chuan CC14 罗弄泉 லோரோங் சுவான்
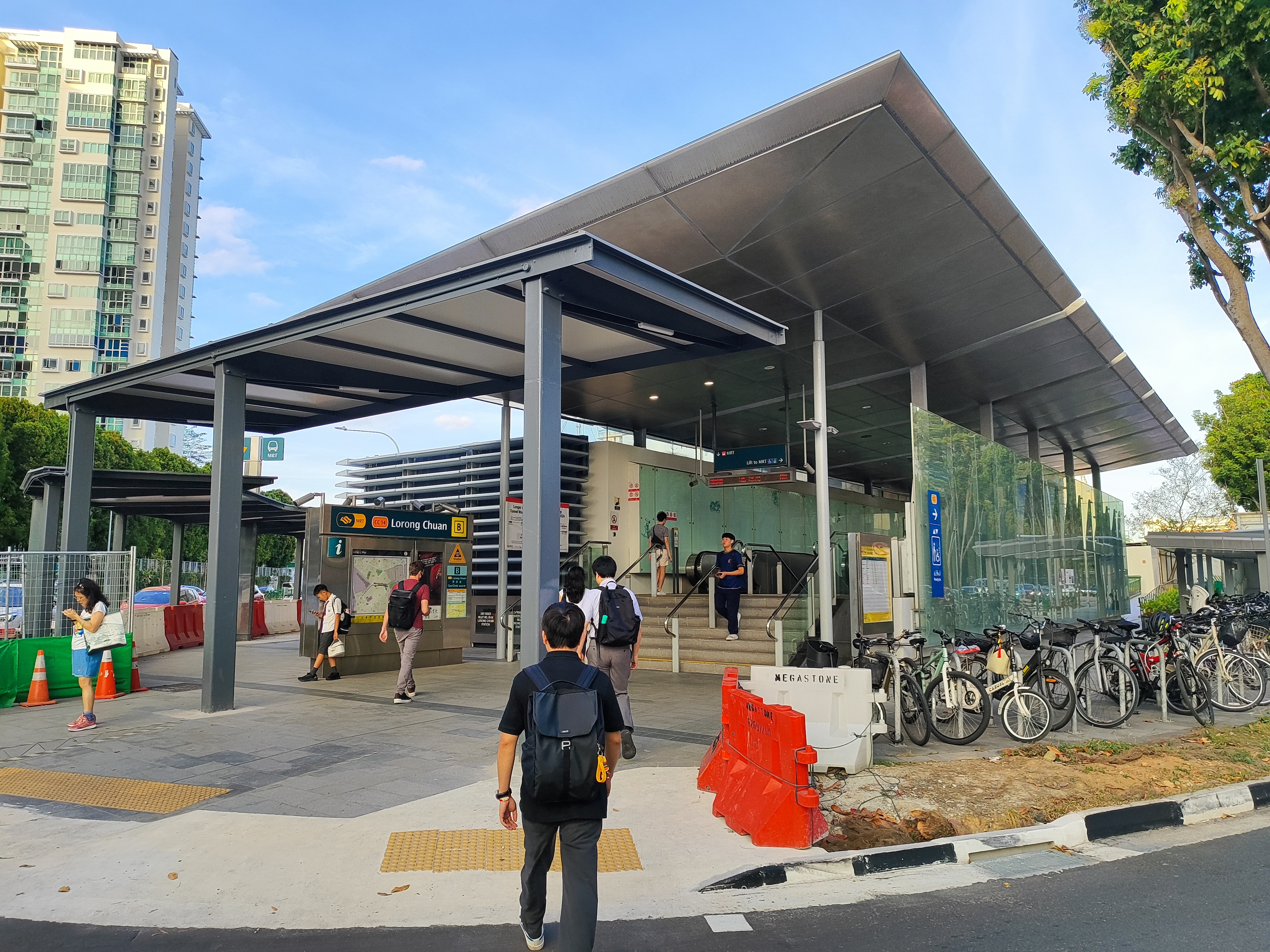
- Exit B of Lorong Chuan MRT station

General information
- Location: 150 Serangoon Avenue 3, Singapore 554533
- Coordinates: 01°21′06″N 103°51′50″E
- System: Mass Rapid Transit (MRT) station
- Owner: Land Transport Authority
- Operator: SMRT Trains
- Line: Circle Line
- Platforms: 2 (1 island platform)
- Tracks: 2
- Connections: Bus, Taxi

Construction
- Structure type: Underground
- Platform levels: 1
- Cycle facilities: Yes
- Accessible: Yes

Other information
- Station code: LRC

History
- Opened: 28 May 2009; 17 years ago
- Former names: Mei Hwan

Passengers
- June 2024: 5,916 per day

Services
| Preceding station | Mass Rapid Transit | Following station |
|---|---|---|
| Serangoon Clockwise | Circle Line | Bishan Anticlockwise |
| Serangoon towards Dhoby Ghaut | Circle Line | Bishan towards Prince Edward Road |
Track layout
Location
- Location within Singapore Rail central area

Lorong Chuan MRT station is an underground Mass Rapid Transit (MRT) station on the Circle Line (CCL) in Serangoon, Singapore. Operated by SMRT Trains, the station serves several nearby landmarks such as the Braddell Heights Community Club, as well as several schools. Through the Looking Glass by A Dose of Light and Yoma Studio, which features a "tongue-in-cheek" map of Singapore, is displayed at this station as part of the Art in Transit artwork programme.

Announced in January 2003 as part of Stage 3 of the CCL, construction started in the third quarter of 2003 with an expected completion date of 2008. Construction for the CCL Stage 3 stations was halted due to the Nicoll Highway collapse before resuming in August 2005. The expected completion date was delayed to 2009. After further changes to Stage 3's opening date, Lorong Chuan commenced operations along with other Stage 3 stations on 28 May 2009.

== History ==
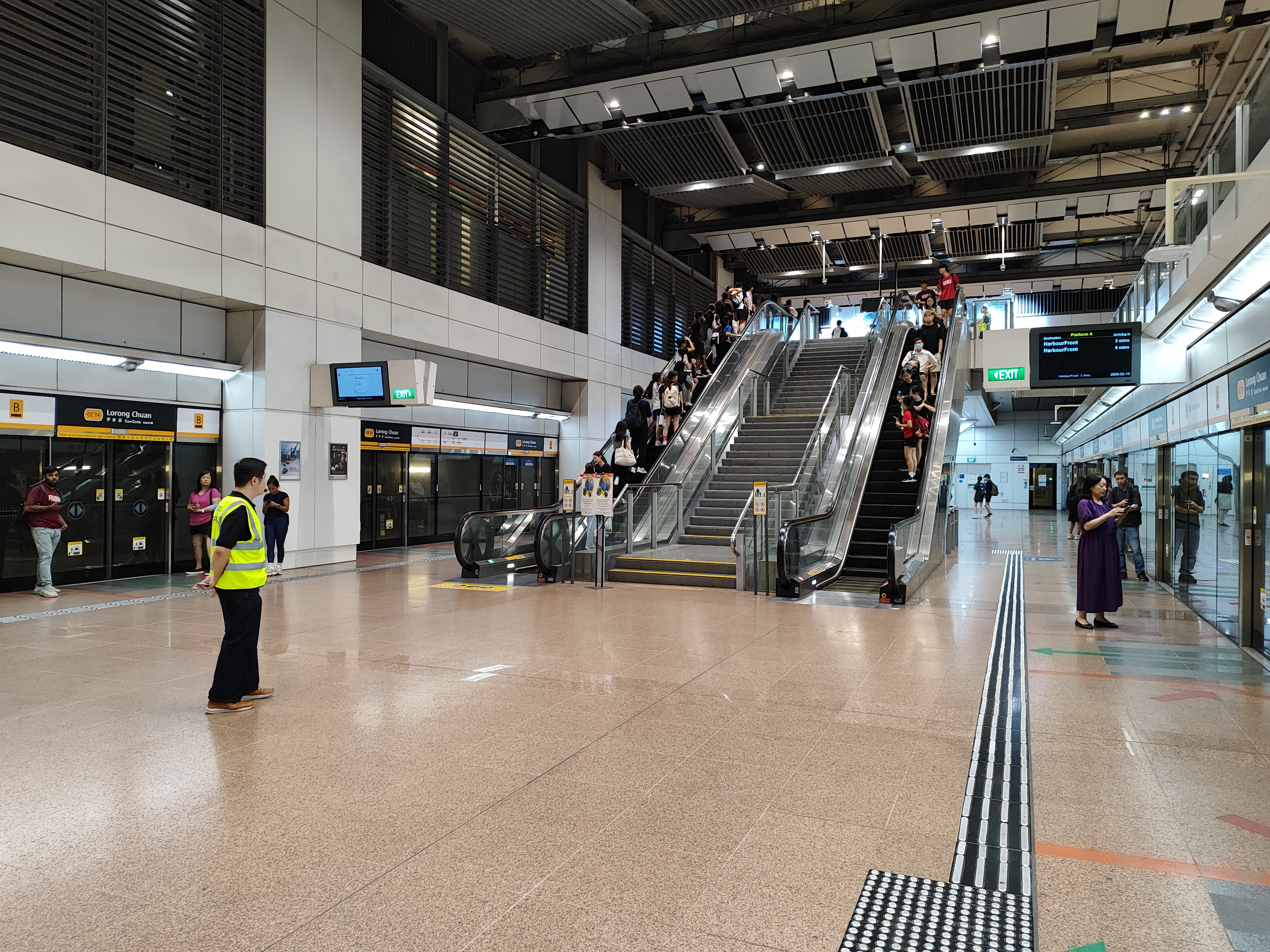
Station platforms

In October 1999, the Land Transport Authority (LTA) announced that the Outer Circle Line, a rail line connecting Paya Lebar, Serangoon, Bishan, and Buona Vista stations, was under study. It was expected for the rail line to be operational by 2006. There were also plans for the Marina Line, another planned rail line, to be extended from Stadium Boulevard station to connect to the Outer Circle Line at Paya Lebar. The Marina Line and the Outer Circle Line would be merged to create the 34 kilometres (21 mi) Circle Line (CCL) in April 2001 as part of the Mass Rapid Transit (MRT) system. In January 2003, it was announced that Lorong Chuan station, which would be near Serangoon Avenue 3 and Lorong Chuan, would be part of CCL Stage 3, a 5.7 kilometres (3.5 mi) stretch between Marymount and Bartley stations. The segment was expected to cost S$1.2 billion (2003) (US$688.79 million).

Sato Kogyo was awarded the S$65 million (2003) (US$37.31 million) contract in June 2003 to build Lorong Chuan station. Construction started for Stage 3 stations in the third quarter of 2003 with expected completion by 2008. However, the Nicoll Highway collapse in April 2004 delayed operations for Stage 3 CCL stations to 2009. The LTA halted work at 16 of the 24 CCL excavation sites so these could be reviewed. In July 2005, the LTA announced that the Street and Buildings Name Board approved the station's name to be "Lorong Chuan".

On 26 August 2005, construction for Stage 3 stations restarted, with the LTA believing that Stage 3 will be constructed by 2008. By then, tunnelling between Lorong Chuan and Serangoon stations was finished. However, the LTA also revealed that Lorong Chuan would be the hardest station to construct, as it is close to several schools and high-rise buildings, with one-tenth of the station's excavation works finished by then. Piling and concreting works for Lorong Chuan were finished by October. In the same month, a family sued Sato Kogyo for noise pollution during construction, with one member of the family claiming that that noise "[affected] their sleep and health". Sato Kogyo won the case in June 2006, with the judge finding that "the plaintiff did not have much trouble sleeping through the night". By that year, it was expected for the station to be completed by next December, with Lorong Chuan and the other Stage 3 stations to be opened by early 2009. By September 2007, the Stage 3 stations were "in advanced stages of completion" according to The Straits Times, with architectural, engineering, and mechanical works being carried out and were expected to finish by mid-2008. In January 2008, the Stage 3 stations' completion date was moved earlier from 2010 to mid-2009.

In June, the LTA started conducting test runs on the Stage 3 stations, with construction expected to be completed by November, and for the section to start operations by June 2009. Construction for the Stage 3 stations was more than 90% completed by October, according to Lim Yong and Desmond Wee of The Straits Times. In February 2009, transport minister Raymond Lim announced that CCL Stage 3 will open on 30 May, thought it was later moved to 28 May. After nearby residents previously expressed concerns over a path to the station for being too "narrow" and "poorly lit", the LTA increased the number of lamps near the path in May 2009. The path could not be widened as it was near a canal and private property, nor could shelters be installed as it was not wide enough, though the path was levelled by the Public Utilities Board so that pools of rainwater will not be formed when it is raining. On 28 May 2009, Lorong Chuan commenced operations alongside other Stage 3 stations.

== Details ==
Lorong Chuan station serves the CCL and is between Bishan and Serangoon stations, with the official station code of CC14. As part of the CCL, the station is operated by SMRT Trains. The station operates between 5:25 am and 12:34 am daily. Train frequencies vary from 3.5 to 5.0 minutes during peak hours to an average of 6 minutes for off-peak hours. Lorong Chuan station is wheelchair accessible. A tactile system, consisting of tiles with rounded or elongated raised studs, guides visually impaired commuters through the station, with dedicated tactile routes that connect the station entrances to the platforms. Wider fare gates allow easier access for wheelchair users into the station. The station also has bicycle facilities and is a civil defence shelter. Lorong Chuan station is near the junction of Serangoon Avenue 3 and Lorong Chuan, and has two exits serving various nearby landmarks such as Braddell Heights Community Club and Bethesda Church and Centre. It also serves several nearby schools such as Nanyang Junior College and St. Gabriel's Primary school.

External Media
- A map of Lorong Chuan's location Source: Land Transport Authority (LTA)
- Visual model of Lorong Chuan station Source: LTA
- Images of Through the Looking Glass Source: Bloomberg Connects

=== Artwork ===
As part of the Art in Transit Programme, a showcase of public artworks on the MRT, Through the Looking Glass by A Dose of Light and Yoma Studio is displayed at Lorong Chuan. Located above the ticketing machines, the artwork is a "tongue-in-cheek" map of Singapore, according to writer Justin Zhuang. The map portrays landmarks such as Changi Airport and the Singapore Flyer; historical events like the arrival of Sang Nila Utama and Stamford Raffles; myths like the Merlion; and major events of 2007, such as the Pedra Branca dispute and Indonesia sand export to Singapore ban. Animals like lions, dugongs, and birds are also depicted. According to Yong Ding Li, one of the artists, the group wanted to create an artwork that commuters could relate with in a short time. The group also intended the artwork to document Singapore in 2007, with artist Zhao Renhui stating that artworks in stations prior to CCL Stage 3 "[don't] say anything after a while".

Through the Looking Glass was submitted to an art competition organised by the LTA for CCL Stage 3 stations. Long was tasked by the group to draw a map of Singapore. Long first drew a world atlas depicting the Earth's geography and biology. When drawing the map of Singapore, Long started by sketching the Central Business District before drawing residential and industrial estates, transport infrastructure, recreational hotspots, and other landmarks. Long spent most of his time drawing Singapore's biology, which was "easy" for him as he liked nature and was a birdwatcher, with his birdwatching hobby helping him to draw remote locations. Through the Looking Glass was originally sketched on three A4-size sheets using a ballpoint pen. The others artists in the group spent "considerable time" scanning, enlarging, and enhancing the piece's linework digitally as Long's drawings were small; they also spent time colouring in the artwork before printing it.
