= Sarkasi Said =

Singaporean artist (1940–2021)

- Born: 27 March 1940; Singapore, Straits Settlements
- Died: 14 October 2021 (aged 81); Singapore
- Education: Tanglin Tinggi Malay Primary School (1946–1948); Madrasah Aljunied Al-Islamiah (1948–1949); Duchess Primary School (1950–1951); Beatty Secondary School (1952–1956)
- Known for: Batik, painting, watercolor painting
- Movement: Contemporary art
- Awards: 2020: Cultural Medallion

Sarkasi bin Said (27 March 1940 – 14 October 2021), best known as Sarkasi Said and also known by the artist name Tzee, was a contemporary Singaporean batik artist known for abstract batik paintings and his use of unconventional wax-resist techniques. Sarkasi experimented with batik techniques since young, later travelling extensively from the 1960s throughout locations such as Indonesia to develop his skills.

Sarkasi's artworks have been internationally exhibited in Malaysia, Indonesia, Brunei, Japan, and the US, and his works can be found in public and private collections, including the National Museum of Singapore collection. In 2003, he created a 103-metre batik painting which set a Guinness World Record for the world’s longest batik painting. Sarkasi has also designed several batik shirts for Prime Minister Lee Hsien Loong to wear during national events. Sarkasi promoted the technique of Malay batik painting by holding various art workshops, also volunteering as an art teacher at a drug rehabilitation centre. Besides visual art, Sarkasi was also involved in acting in Malay dramas and films.

In 2020, Sarkasi was awarded the Cultural Medallion for his contributions to visual art in Singapore.

On 14 October 2021, Sarkasi died of kidney failure.

== Education and personal life ==
Sarkasi was born in Singapore on 27 Mar 1940. Sarkasi would be raised by his grandparents as his parents had separated when he was three years old. His grandparents were originally from Karang Malang, Indonesia. As a boy, Sarkasi would help his grandmother sell batik, learning and experimenting with batik techniques during a time where batik was considered a desired artistic commodity.

From 1946 to 1948, Sarkasi studied at Tanglin Tinggi Malay Primary School, later attending Madrasah Aljunied Al-Islamiah from 1948 to 1949, and Duchess Primary School from 1950 to 1951. He would then begin attending Beatty Secondary School in 1952, dropping out in 1956 to pursue art.

== Career ==
After leaving school in 1956, Sarkasi took to street painting, cycling around Singapore to paint scenes of nature. He sold his paintings in the Bartley and Gilstead areas of Singapore, his works becoming popular with the expatriates living there.

In the 1960s, Sarkasi travelled extensively around Southeast Asia to learn from batik printing centres and develop his knowledge of batik techniques. In his travels to Indonesia, he further visited Karang Malang, his grandparents’ hometown. During this trip, Sarkasi also studied under Aznam Effendy, a teacher and painter at the Yayasan Akademi Senipura Nasional in Jakarta.

In 1970, Sarkasi established the shop Tzee Creations in Singapore with four other partners, creating batik designs for clothes to be sold there. Batik-print dresses were sold at Tzee Creation, with Sarkasi expanding his batik designs to shirts, scarves and other products that were sold locally and overseas.

The year 1973 is considered Sarkasi's breakout year, with the artist holding two solo exhibitions, the first featuring 300 paintings, and the second, 50. These featured a range of mediums, spanning batik paintings, acrylic, ink, and watercolours. In 1974, Sarkasi would be awarded Pingat APAD (from the Association of Artists of Various Resources, Singapore). In 1977, after attending a gallery exhibition of Italian artist Ottavio Romano using batik techniques, Sarkasi, as a Javanese, felt the need to focus on batik art as a traditional form within the region.

In 1980, a nationwide search for a national dress for formal wear in Singapore and abroad was initiated by the Ministry of Culture, though the project was eventually cancelled by 1981. In 1989, the search was revived as a "textile design" competition by the National Trades Union Congress (NTUC) through the Singapore Dress Fabric Design Drawing Competition 1989. Sarkasi's design, incorporating a batik painting of an orchid, was one of four designs chosen.

In 1981 Sarkasi would win the Best Foreign Entry at the Sarasota Art Exhibition in the US. In 1993, Sarkasi started conducting classes as a volunteer art teacher at the Khalsa Crescent Drug Rehabilitation Centre.

In 2003, Sarkasi created a 103-metre batik painting which set a Guinness World Record for the world’s longest batik painting. Sarkasi would be a board member of art committees such as the National Arts Council, Singapore from 2006 to 2008, Singapore’s Modern Art Society, and the Malay Museum Committee, also being appointed the Chairman of Public Affairs and Education at the Malay Heritage Foundation.

In 2009, the batik work View of Life was made for the Circle Line’s Art in Transit project, with reproductions of the original batik pieces displayed at the Serangoon MRT station. The original batik pieces would be gifted by the Land Transport Authority to the NUS Museum.

A solo exhibition of Sarkasi's batik works, "... Always Moving": The Batik Art of Sarkasi Said, was held at the NUS Museum in 2017.

In 2020, Sarkasi was awarded the Cultural Medallion for his contributions to visual art in Singapore.

== Death ==
Sarkasi died on 14 October 2021 due to kidney failure.

== Art ==
=== View of Life (2009) ===
Displayed at the Circle Line concourse level of Serangoon MRT station, View of Life by Sarkasi is an 18-panel abstract batik painting expressing the movements of change and nature. Inspired by the lalangs that used to grow in the Serangoon area, the work was intended to reflect the artist's love of batik painting.

Feeling that Singapore's development was underappreciated, Sarkasi decided to create a painting that reflects the "optimism, joy and vitality" of the country's achievements. Initially, the artist wanted to do an impressionist painting, but eventually decided to challenge commuters to think of art "beyond just aesthetics", giving them a learning experience on art as they "communicate what they see" from the work. The type of each brush stroke on the painting depended on the artist's movements and character. The coloured wax was splashed on the white canvas. Using wax-resist, the artist treated each splash with chemicals to dye the colour on the canvas made of thick denim material.

Created in Sarkasi's studio in Indonesia, the work involves nature: The dyes require sunlight for colours to be brought out, with varying weather conditions affecting how the colours came out. With concerns of possible damage the painting might face due to constant exposure to commuter traffic, a photographed digital copy was installed at the station. Even if the original work was protected by glass, the panels might still break. The painting was photographed, printed and laminated before being mounted on the station walls. The original was donated to the NUS Museum. Some of the panels were initially mounted upside down, but Sarkasi corrected the panels' alignments.
