= Serangoon Bus Interchange =

Bus interchange in Serangoon, Singapore

Serangoon Bus Interchange 实龙岗巴士转换站 Pusat Pertukaran Bas Serangoon
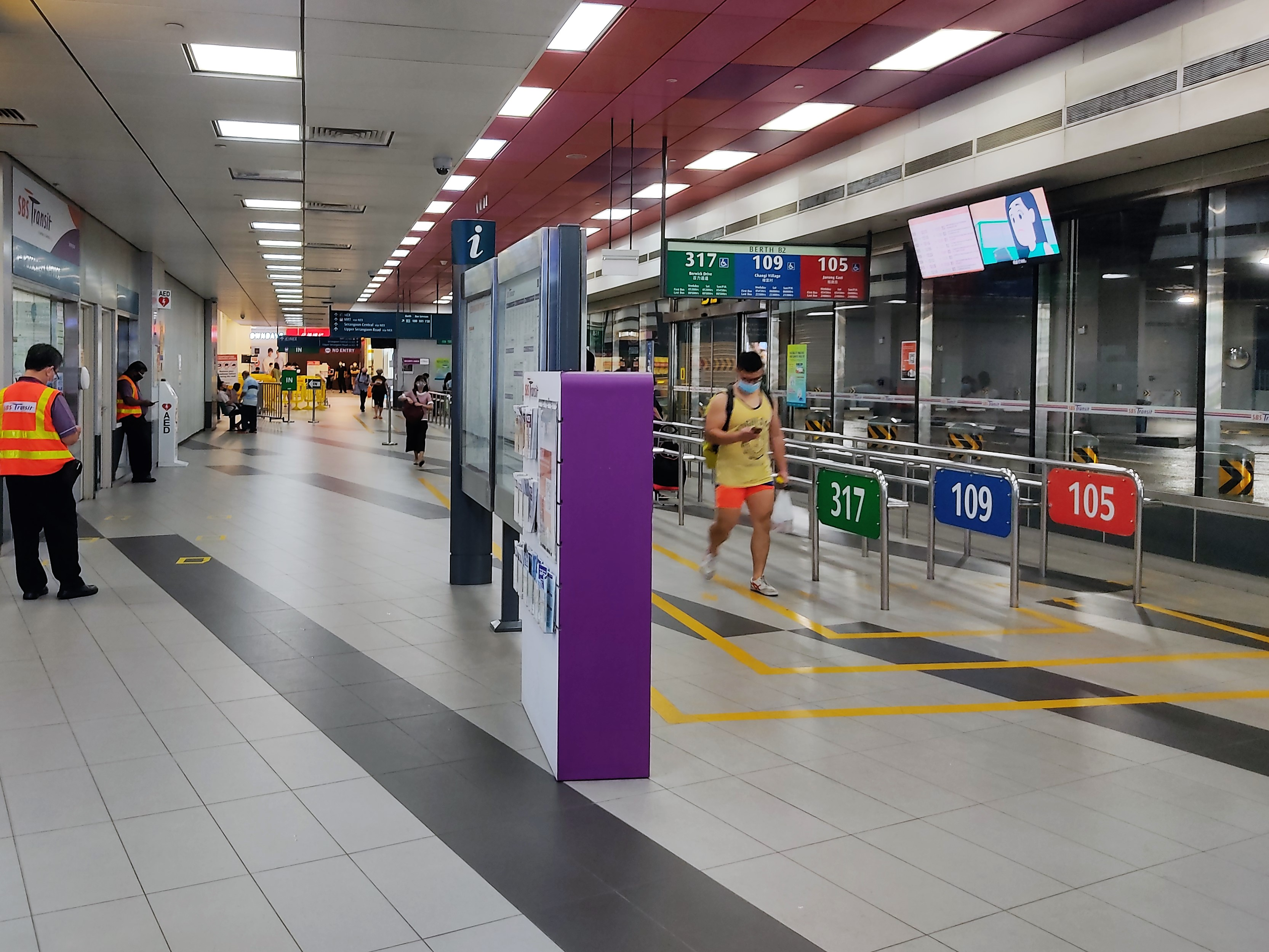
- Interior of the bus interchange.

General information
- Location: 20 Serangoon Avenue 2, Singapore 556138
- System: Public Bus Interchange
- Owner: Land Transport Authority
- Operator: SBS Transit
- Bus routes: 9 (SBS Transit)
- Bus stands: 2 Linear Alighting Berths; 3 Sawtooth Boarding Berths
- Bus operators: SBS Transit
- Connections: NE12 CC13 Serangoon

Construction
- Structure type: At-grade
- Accessible: Accessible alighting/boarding points Accessible public toilets Graduated kerb edges Tactile guidance system

History
- Opened: 13 March 1988; 38 years ago (Old); 3 September 2011; 15 years ago (Integrated Transport Hub)
- Closed: 2 September 2011; 15 years ago (Old)

Key dates
- 13 March 1988: Commenced operations
- 3 September 2011: Operations transferred to new and air-conditioned bus interchange as Integrated Transport Hub
Location

Serangoon Bus Interchange is an air-conditioned bus interchange located at Serangoon Central, serving residential areas around Serangoon, Kovan and Serangoon Garden.

== History ==
In November 1984, it was announced that Serangoon will have a new bus interchange to serve the new residential estates, replacing the old bus terminal at Serangoon Garden. During construction, a temporary bus terminal along Serangoon Avenue 3 was established. The bus interchange, located between Serangoon Central and Serangoon Avenue 2, opened on 13 March 1988. The compound was located under a multi-storey carpark, with end-on berths on the eastern side and sawtooth berths on the western side. Access to the interchange was located along Serangoon Central.

When Nex shopping mall opened on 25 November 2010, the old bus interchange continued to operate due to congestion at Serangoon Avenue 2, with shoppers facing shortage of carparking and large crowds in the shopping mall.

=== Relocation ===
On 3 September 2011, the interchange was relocated to a new air-conditioned facility along Serangoon Avenue 2 integrated with Nex and Serangoon MRT station, making it the fifth bus interchange to be air conditioned. The new facility was the first to have glass walls instead of cement walls facing the bus bays, allowing commuters to be aware of the departure of buses, which was not present in the earlier air conditioned bus interchanges. Due to space constraints, Bus Services 81 and 82 no longer terminated at the interchange and were amended to loop at Serangoon Central instead.4

Serangoon Bus Interchange is undergoing renovation works from August 2024.

== Bus contracting model ==
Under the bus contracting model, all bus services operating from Serangoon Bus Interchange were divided into two bus packages, operated by the anchor operator, SBS Transit Ltd.

=== List of bus services ===
Operator	Package	Routes
SBS Transit	Clementi	100, 100A, 506 (from June 2027)
SBS Transit	Serangoon-Eunos	101, 103, 105, 109, 109A, 158, 315, 317, 506
SMRT Buses	Serangoon-Eunos	101, 103, 105, 109, 109A, 158, 315, 317 (from June 2027)
