= Bartley MRT station =

Mass Rapid Transit station in Singapore

Bartley CC12 巴特礼 பார்ட்லி
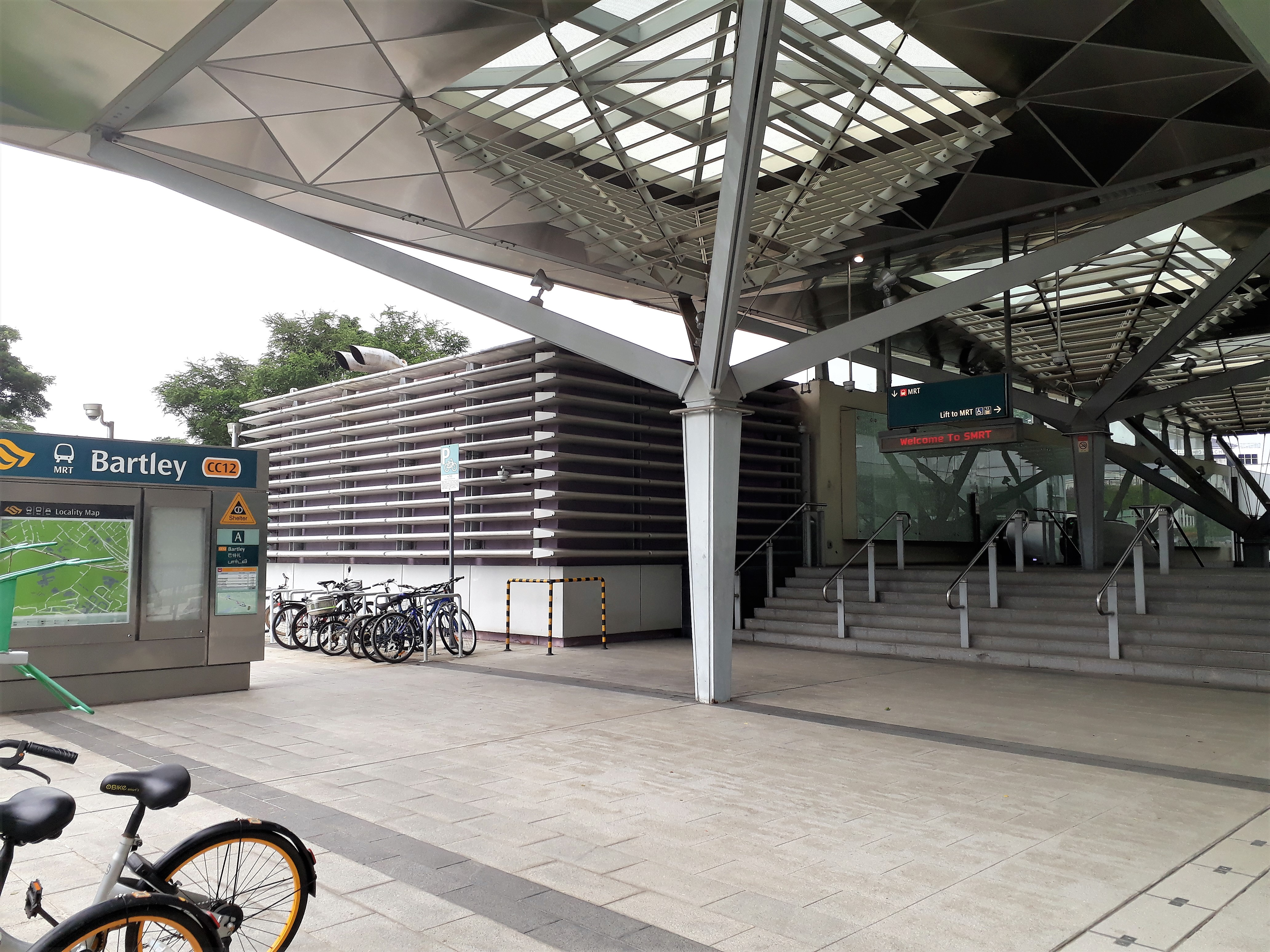
- Exit A of Bartley MRT station

General information
- Location: 90 Bartley Road, Singapore 539788
- Coordinates: 01°20′33″N 103°52′48″E
- System: Mass Rapid Transit (MRT) station
- Owner: Land Transport Authority
- Operator: SMRT Trains
- Line: Circle Line
- Platforms: 2 (1 island platform)
- Tracks: 2
- Connections: Bus, Taxi

Construction
- Structure type: Underground
- Platform levels: 1
- Cycle facilities: Yes
- Accessible: Yes

Other information
- Station code: BLY

History
- Opened: 28 May 2009; 17 years ago

Passengers
- June 2024: 5,640 per day

Services
Preceding station	Mass Rapid Transit	Following station
Tai Seng Clockwise	Circle Line	Serangoon Anticlockwise
Tai Seng towards Dhoby Ghaut	Circle Line	Serangoon towards Prince Edward Road
Track layout
Location
- Location within Singapore Rail central area

Bartley MRT station is an underground Mass Rapid Transit (MRT) station on the Circle Line in Serangoon, Singapore. Operated by SMRT, it serves nearby landmarks such as Maris Stella High School, Bartley Secondary School, and Ramakrishna Mission Singapore.

Announced in January 2003 as part of Stage 3 of the Circle Line (CCL), construction started in the third quarter of 2003 with an expected completion date of 2008. Construction for the CCL Stage 3 stations was halted due to the Nicoll Highway collapse before resuming in August 2005. The expected completion date was delayed to 2009. After further changes to Stage 3's opening date, Bartley commenced operations along with other Stage 3 stations on 28 May 2009. Bartley was the terminus for the CCL until the line was extended to Dhoby Ghaut in April 2010.

Bartley is located between Tai Seng and Serangoon stations. The Coin Mat by Jane Lee, which features one-cent coins installed on a wall, is displayed at this station as part of the Art in Transit artwork programme.

== History ==
Plans for a circular line were conceptualised in November 1989, where Minister for Communications and Information Yeo Ning Hong stated that such a system would only be viable when Singapore's population reached 4 million. In October 1999, the Land Transport Authority (LTA) announced that the Outer Circle Line, a rail line connecting Paya Lebar, Serangoon, Bishan, and Buona Vista stations, was under study as part of the LTA's plan to link regional places via rail by 2030. The rail line was expected to be operational after 2005. There were also plans for the Marina Line, another planned rail line, to be extended from Boulevard station to connect to the Outer Circle Line at Paya Lebar. The Marina Line and the Outer Circle Line would be merged to create the 34 km (21 mi) Circle line (CCL) in April 2001 as part of the Mass Rapid Transit (MRT) system, and Bartley was announced in January 2003 to be part of CCL Stage 3, a 5.7 km (3.5 mi) stretch between this station and Marymount. The segment was expected to cost S$1.2 billion (2003) (US$688.79 million).

The contract for the construction of Bartley MRT Station was awarded to Wan Soon Construction Pte Ltd at a sum of S$63.5 million (2003) (US$36.45 million) by July 2003. Construction started for Stage 3 stations in the third quarter of 2003 with expected completion by 2008. Wan Soon's contract was novated by the LTA in June 2004, with Tobishima Corporation taking over. However, the Nicoll Highway collapse in April 2004 delayed operations for Stage 3 CCL stations to 2009; the LTA halted work at 16 of the 24 CCL excavation sites so these could be reviewed. In October, it was discovered that construction works for Bartley station caused the ground underneath Maris Stella High School's gates to sink and cracks to form near the school's electrical substation, with Millennia Institute reporting tremors in one of its blocks a few months ago. The LTA monitored both schools and determined that there was no danger, according to Karamjit Kaur of The Straits Times.

Excavation works at Bartley were slated to begin in February 2005. In July, the LTA announced that the Street and Buildings Name Board approved the station's name to be "Bartley"; the LTA conducted a public survey last year, and "Bartley" was the most popular choice. Construction for Stage 3 stations restarted on 26 August 2005, with the LTA believing that Stage 3 would be constructed by 2008. By then, one-tenth of Bartley's excavation work was finished. Bartley was expected to be completed by December 2007, with the Stage 3 stations to be completed by early 2009. By September 2007, the Stage 3 stations were "in advanced stages of completion" according to Maria Almenoar of The Straits Times, with architectural, engineering, and mechanical works under way and expected to finish by mid-2008; the Stage 3 stations' completion date was moved earlier from 2010 to mid-2009.

In June, the LTA started conducting test runs on the Stage 3 stations, with construction expected to be completed by November, and for the section to start operations by June 2009. Construction for the Stage 3 stations was more than 90% completed by October 2008, according to Lim Yong and Desmond Wee of The Straits Times. In February 2009, transport minister Raymond Lim announced that CCL Stage 3 would open on 30 May, though it was later moved to 28 May. Bartley commenced operations alongside other Stage 3 stations on 28 May 2009. The station was the terminus for the Circle Line until the line was extended to Dhoby Ghaut on 17 April 2010.

== Details ==
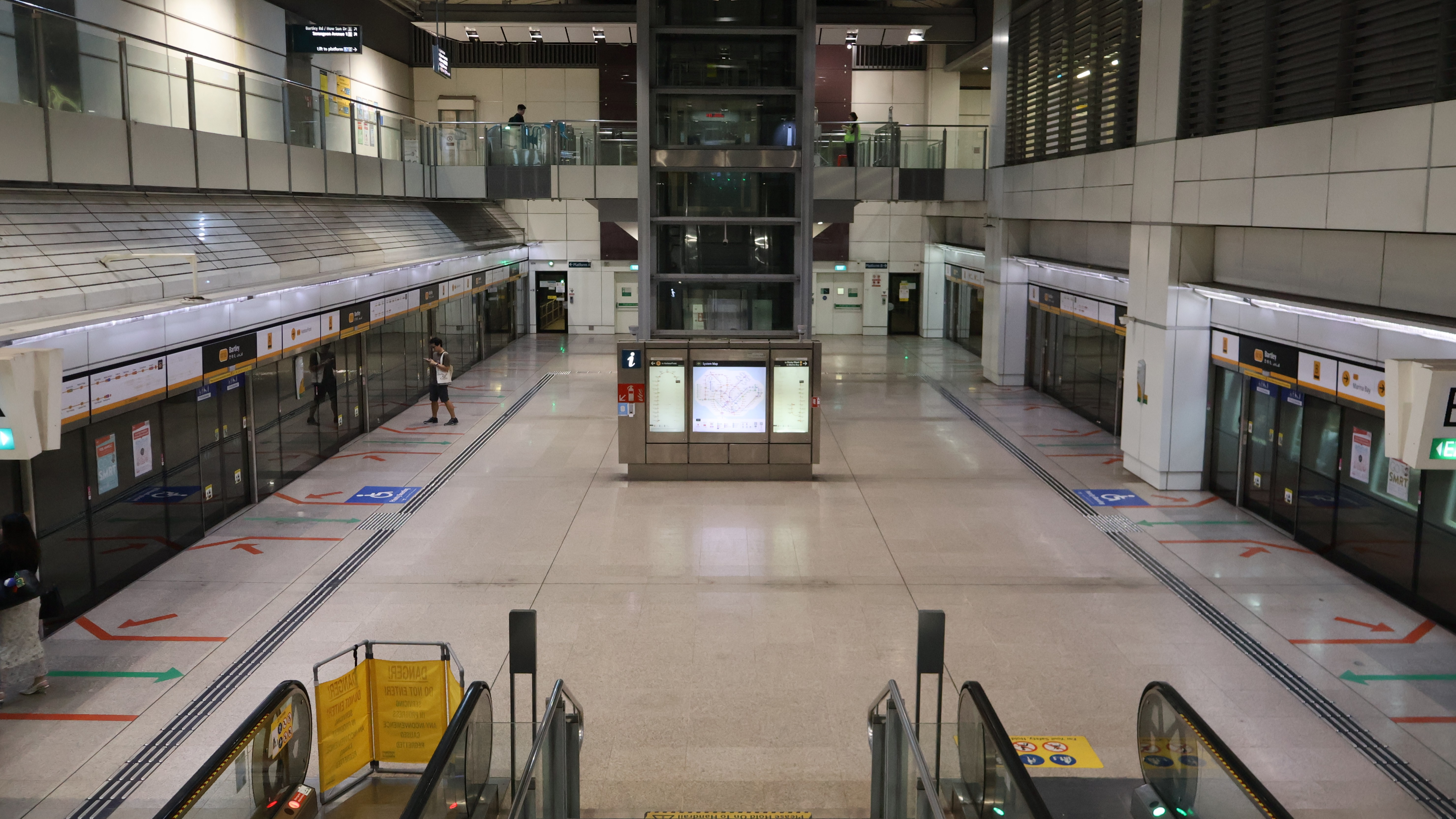
Bartley station's platforms

Bartley station serves the CCL and is between Tai Seng and Serangoon stations, with the official station code of CC12. As part of the CCL, the station is operated by SMRT Trains. The station operates between 5:16 am and 12:24 am daily, with longer operating hours during public holidays. Train frequencies vary from 3.5 to 5.0–7.0 minutes during peak hours to an average of 6.0 minutes for off-peak hours during the weekday, with an average of 5.0 minutes for peak hours on Saturday, and an average of 6.0 minutes for off-peak hours on the weekend. As of June 2024, Bartley served 5,640 passengers per day. Bartley station is wheelchair accessible, having wider fare gates to allow easier access for wheelchair users into the station. A tactile system, consisting of tiles with rounded or elongated raised studs, guides visually impaired commuters through the station, with dedicated tactile routes that connect the station entrances to the platforms. The station also has bicycle facilities and is a civil defence shelter. Bartley station is underground and runs alongside Bartley Road; the station has two exits serving various nearby landmarks such as the Maris Stella High School, Mount Vernon camp of the Gurkha Contingent, and Bartley Secondary School. It also serves several nearby religious institutions such as the Ramakrishna Mission Singapore, Bartley Christian Church, and Paya Lebar Methodist Chinese Church, and has two nearby bus stops.

External Media
- A map of Bartley's location Source: Land Transport Authority (LTA)
- Visual model of Bartley station Source: LTA
- Images of The Coin Mat Source: Bloomberg Connects

As part of the Art in Transit Programme, a showcase of public artworks on the MRT, The Coin Mat by Jane Lee is displayed at Bartley. Located at the ticket machines, the 4.8 × 8.6 m (15.7 × 28.2 ft) artwork consists of 164,800 one-cent coins displayed on a wall. As they are not arranged in any order, some of the coins display the side with the Vanda Miss Joaquim, whilst the rest display the side with the Singapore coat of arms. According to writer Justin Zhuang, Lee chose to use one-cent coins as it was the most economical, as well as displaying Singapore's visual heritage since it was out of circulation at the time of conceptualisation; Lee also felt that "train stations and public transport have always been closely related with coins", adding that since the artwork was near the ticket machines, commuters could relate to the work. Between September and November 2006, the LTA organised an art competition for certain CCL stations as part of a S$4.8 million (2006) (US$3.02 million) plan to install artworks on the CCL, with The Coin Mat as one of the competition's winners. Mayo Martin of TODAY commented that he initially thought The Coin Mat would be "another glittery mosaic". When he realised that the artwork consisted of coins, Martin complimented the artwork's integration with the ticket machines, stating that the artwork "fits its space to a T".
