= Nex, Singapore =

Regional shopping mall in Serangoon, Singapore

nex
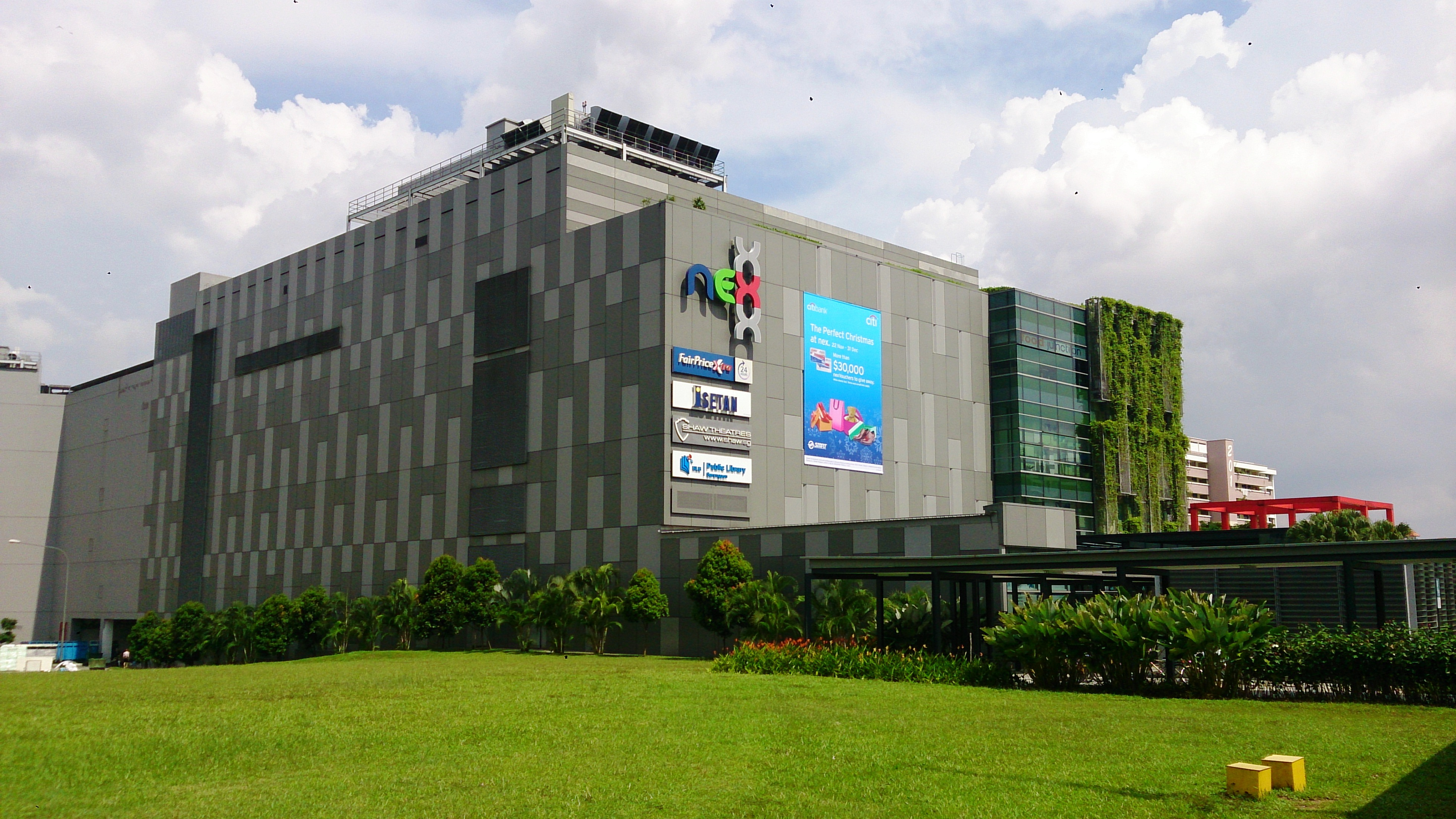
- Main facade
- Location: Serangoon New Town, Singapore
- Coordinates: 1°21′02″N 103°52′21″E
- Address: 23 Serangoon Central, Singapore 556083
- Opened: 25 November 2010; 15 years ago (soft opening); 21 April 2011; 15 years ago (official opening)
- Num. of stores: 340
- Num. of anchor tenants: 13; Fairprice Xtra; Shaw Theatres; Serangoon Public Library; Cold Storage; Courts; H&M; Uniqlo &JOY Dining Hall; Beauty In A Pot; Food Junction; Food Republic; Anytime Fitness; Kiddy Palace
- Floor area: 600,000 square feet (56,000 m^{2})
- Floors: 7 (B2, B1, 1-4, 4R)
- Public transit: NE12 CC13 Serangoon, Serangoon Bus Interchange
- Website: www.nex.com.sg

nex (stylised in all lowercase) is a regional shopping mall in Serangoon, within the North-East Region of Singapore. The largest mall in North-East Singapore and one of the largest suburban malls in the country, it is integrated with the air-conditioned Serangoon Bus Interchange and the Serangoon MRT station.

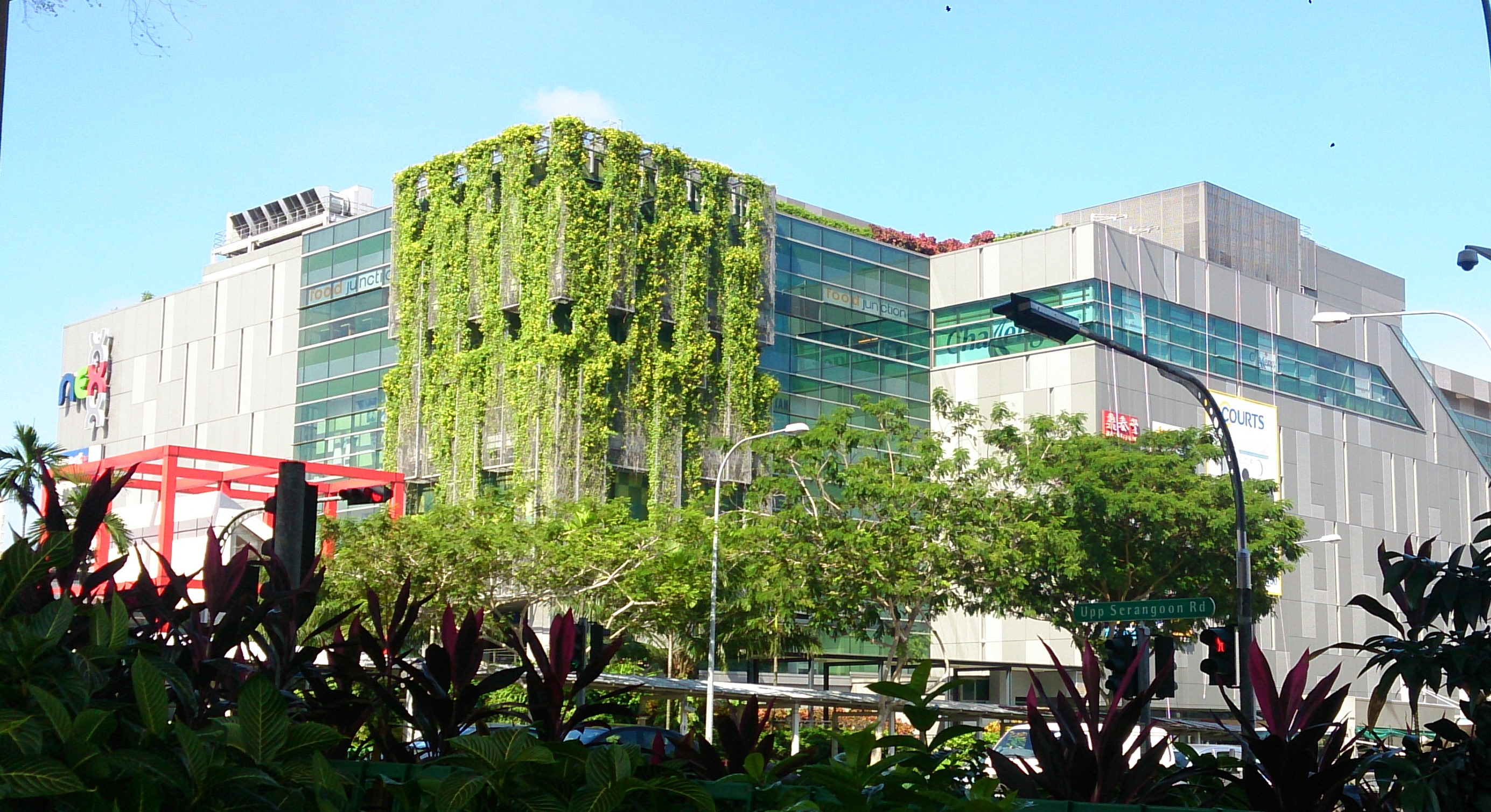
Taken from another angle, showing green wall

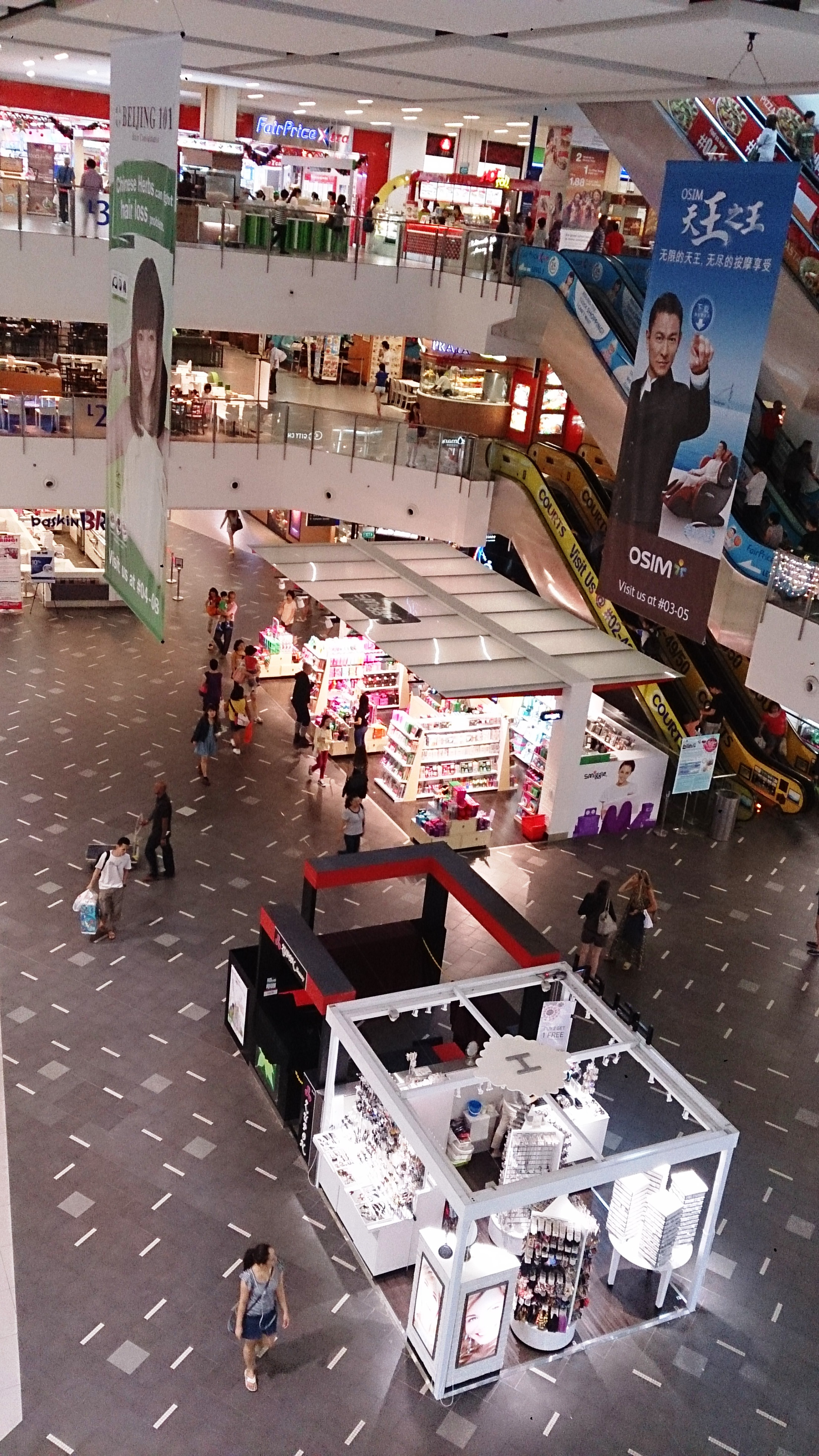
Ground floor of Nex

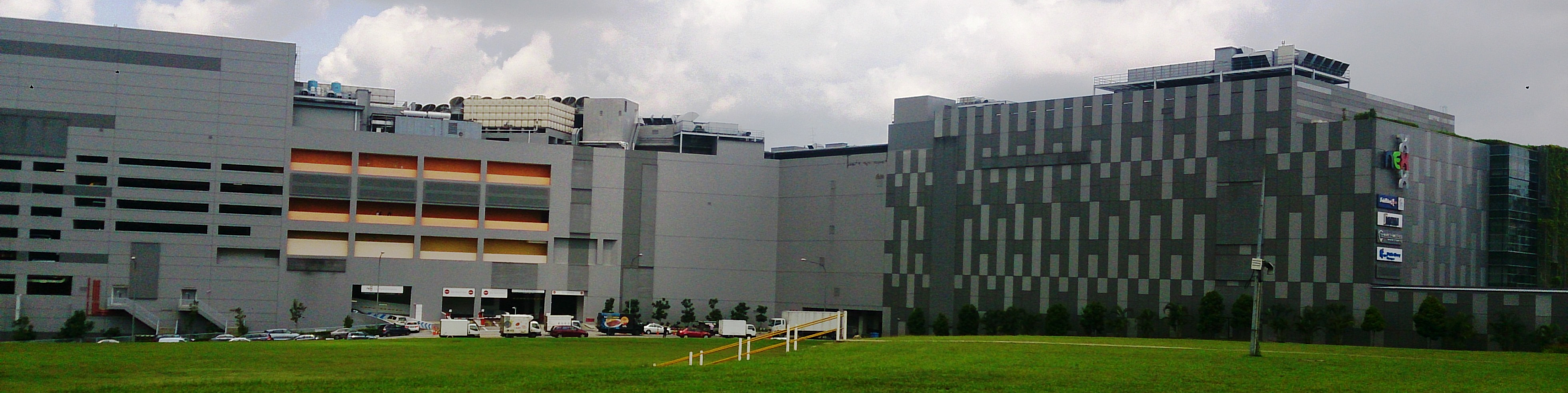
Showing the car park building at the left. Cinemas are right above the carpark. The raised portion on the right houses the Serangoon Public Library.

== History ==
Built on an empty plot of land right above the Circle line portion of Serangoon MRT station, NEX was developed by its owner, Gold Ridge Pte Ltd and was completed in November 2010. As a regional mall, it had two food courts, Food Junction and Food Republic, an NTUC FairPrice Xtra hypermarket, a Cold Storage supermarket, a Shaw Theatres cinema, and more than 380 shops back then. The mall pioneered several firsts in Singapore, such as a rooftop dog park integrated with a dry and wet playground and Serangoon Public Library, the first public library to be built on a rooftop. The mall's second basement (lowest floor of the mall) houses the Serangoon Bus Interchange.

In 2014, the mall underwent minor renovations, such as renovating a part of Level 1 to incorporate fashion giants Uniqlo and H&M, and relocating Kiddy Palace to level 4. The mall's tenant mix was also slightly refreshed as well, such as Anytime Fitness opening on the roof level of the mall, and various beauty tenants occupying a part of the ground floor (Basement 1) and Level 1, such as Innisfree, Sephora and jewelry shops such as Swarovski.

== Incident ==
On 30 August 2020 at about 4.45pm, a piece of ventilation duct was dislodged from a Shaw cinema hall 3 ceiling while screening Tenet, resulting in two injuries. A spokesperson informed that the outlet would be temporarily closed until further notice. The theatre later resumed operations on 18 March 2021.

== Awards ==
- 2018 - BCA Green Mark
