= Monk's Hill Secondary School =

- 蒙克山中学; Sekolah Menengah Monk's Hill மாங்க்ஸ் ஹில் உயர்நிலைப்பள்ளி

Location
- 12 Winstedt Road, Singapore 227978 (Former Address); Singapore

Information
- Type: Government; Co-educational
- Motto: The Will To Win
- Established: 1958; 68 years ago
- Status: Merged with Balestier Hill Secondary School in 2007.
- Closed: 2006; 20 years ago
- Session: Single
- Principal: N/A
- Enrolment: N/A (Closed)
- Colour: Red Blue Green Yellow

The former Monk's Hill Secondary School (Abbreviation: MHSS; Chinese: 蒙克山中学) was a secondary school in Newton, Singapore.

== History ==
=== Founding ===
Monk's Hill Secondary School was founded in 1958 on a plot of land that was once the site of a Chinese monastery. The name 'Monk's Hill' is a reminder of this piece of history. 1960 Monk's Hill presented its first batch of candidates for the national School Certificate Examination. In 1961 Monk's Hill was converted into an integrated school, offering both Malay- and English-stream classes.

Monk's Hill Secondary held its first Speech and Prize-Presentation Day in 1967, and witnessed the formation of its School Advisory Committee in 1968. In 1976, Monk's Hill established itself as an English-medium school with effect of the merger of the two national education streams, namely Chinese and English streams.

In 1989, the Alumni Association of Monk's Hill Secondary School was formed. In 1993, Monk's Hill Secondary School relocated to its new premises at 12 Winstedt Road, and adopted a single session timetable. The Parent-Teacher Support Group was formed in 2000.

On 14 May 2004, the Ministry of Education announced that under the programme PRIME Phase 6, Anglo-Chinese School (Junior) will be relocated to the current site of Monk's Hill Secondary School.

=== Closure ===
In January 2007, Monk's Hill Secondary School was merged into Balestier Hill Secondary School at Novena due to a drastic drop in enrollment, at fewer than 300 in 2006. Nevertheless, the school attained the Academic Value Award in 2005 in recognition for its academic excellence.

A Flag Lowering Ceremony was held at 6:00 p.m. 22 November 2006 at 12, Winstedt Road, MHSS Parade Square. A few hundred former students turned up to witness the event together with the present staff and students. The school flag was presented to its principal, Mr. Syed Mohamed Ashraf Shah for his entrustment and safekeeping.

The former premises of Monk's Hill Secondary was, in 2009, taken over by the Anglo-Chinese Junior School.

== Principal ==
Name of principal	Years served
Mr A.G. Meyer	1958 - 1958
Mr Abdul Karim Bin Bagoo	1959 - 1964
Mr Jacob Yoong	1964 - 1976
Mr Joseph Ng	1976 - 1982
Mrs Neo Bick Yin	1982 - 1988
Mrs Sita Vimalachandran	1988 - 1992
Mr Toh Chye Seng	1992 - 1994
Mrs Gan Lai Chui	1994 - 1997
Mrs Abdullah Tarmugi	1998 - 2002
Mr Syed Mohamed Ashraf Shah	2002 - 2007

== Achievements ==
=== Sports excellence ===
The former Monk's Hill Secondary School is a dominant icon in school sports in the 1960s and 1970s, especially in the inter-school rugby tournaments. Monk's Hill Secondary School was remembered as a title contender against of Raffles Institution, St Joseph's Institution and Beatty Secondary School for inter-schools rugby championship. Monk's Hill students also regularly participated in cricket, track and field, swimming and cross country races.

== Notable alumni ==
- K Muralidharan Pillai – Politician: Member of Singapore Parliament
- Dr Tan See Leng – Politician: Government minister and Member of Singapore Parliament
