= Tai Seng MRT station =

Mass Rapid Transit station in Singapore

Tai Seng CC11 大成 தை செங்
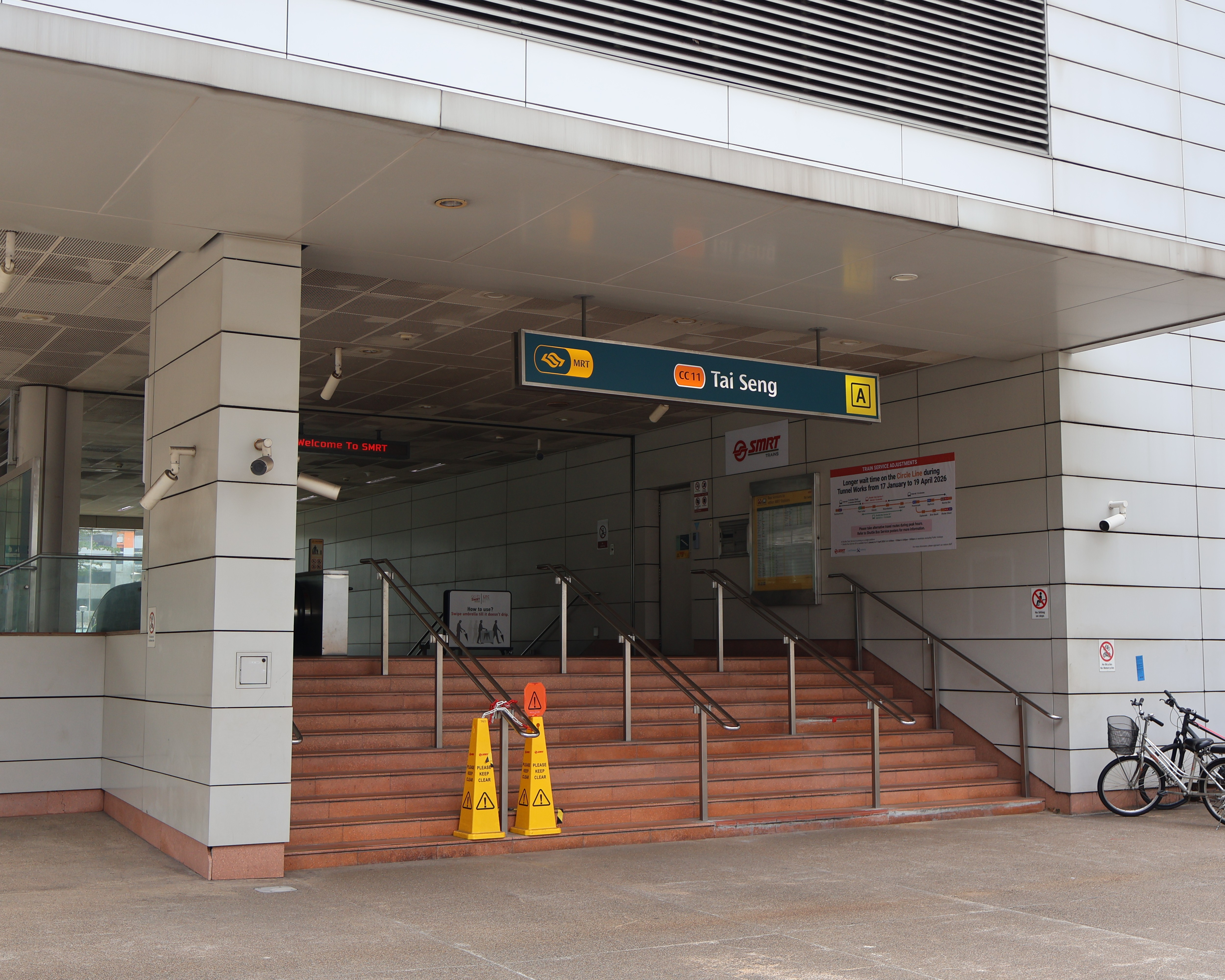
- Exit A of Tai Seng MRT station

General information
- Location: 33 Upper Paya Lebar Road, Singapore 534803
- Coordinates: 01°20′09″N 103°53′16″E
- System: Mass Rapid Transit (MRT) station
- Owner: Land Transport Authority
- Operator: SMRT Trains
- Line: Circle Line
- Platforms: 2 (1 island platform)
- Tracks: 2
- Connections: Bus, Taxi

Construction
- Structure type: Underground
- Platform levels: 1
- Accessible: Yes

Other information
- Station code: TSG

History
- Opened: 17 April 2010; 16 years ago
- Former names: Upper Paya Lebar, Kampung Ampat

Passengers
- June 2024: 16,998 per day

Services
Preceding station	Mass Rapid Transit	Following station
MacPherson Clockwise	Circle Line	Bartley Anticlockwise
MacPherson towards Dhoby Ghaut	Circle Line	Bartley towards Prince Edward Road
Track layout
Location
- Location within Singapore Rail central area

Tai Seng MRT station is an underground Mass Rapid Transit (MRT) station on the Circle Line (CCL) in Tai Seng, Singapore. Operated by SMRT Corporation, the station serves nearby landmarks such as Tai Seng Point, Sakae Building, and Leong Huat Building. As part of the Art-in-Transit programme, Equilibrium by Francis Ng, composed of two parallel displays of red, yellow, and blue coloured triangles, is displayed at this station.

First announced as part of Stage 2 of the CCL in April 2001, the station was initially named Upper Paya Lebar. Digging and tunnelling works began in early 2003, but were halted by the Nicoll Highway collapse in April 2004. The station was renamed to Tai Seng in July 2005. Following an arbitration case with one of the station's contractors, NCC International, over stalled construction, the LTA appointed another company to finish Tai Seng's construction. Tai Seng, along with other stations from this station to Dhoby Ghaut, opened on 17 April 2010, with an open house held prior to the opening.

== History ==
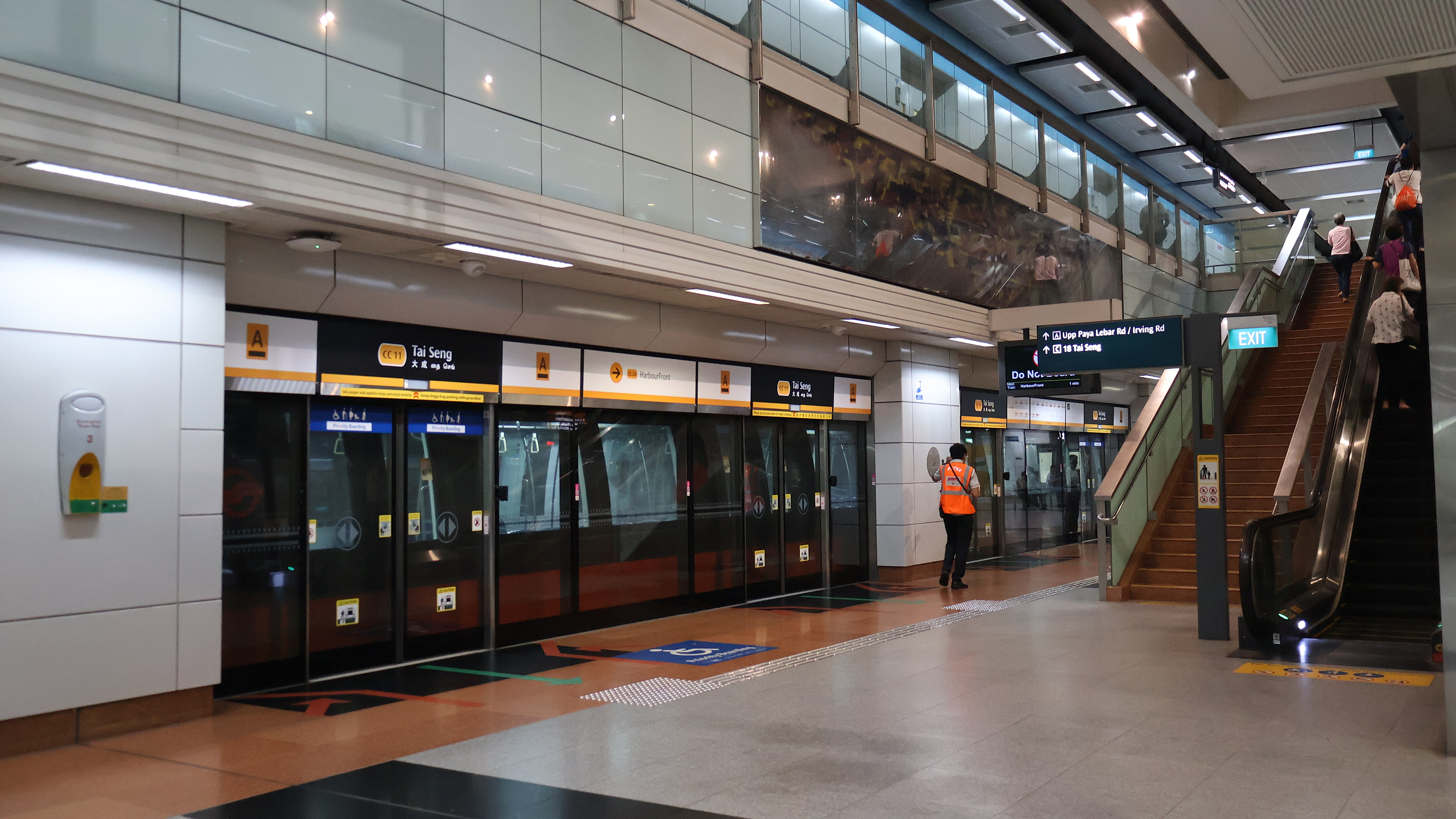
Platform level of the station with the Art-in-Transit work featured above

In November 1999, the Land Transport Authority (LTA) announced that it would extend the Marina Line, a planned rail line, from Stadium Boulevard station to connect to the Outer Circle Line at Paya Lebar. The Marina Line and the Outer Circle Line would be merged to create the 34 km (21 mi) Circle line (CCL) in April 2001; the second phase of the CCL involved a 5 km (3.1 mi) extension from Stadium Boulevard to Upper Paya Lebar Road with 5 stations.

In August 2002, the contract for the tunnel station works of Bartley Road and Upper Paya Lebar Road stations was awarded to a joint venture between Econ Corp and NCC International for S$339 million (2002) (US$189.32 million). Digging and tunnelling of the station began in early 2003, with a segment of Upper Paya Lebar Road from Kim Chuan Road to Jalan Bunga Rampai realigned in March and April 2003 for the construction of the station. The realignment works included the relocation of bus stops. However, the Nicoll Highway collapse in April 2004 delayed operations for Stage 2 CCL stations to 2009. The LTA halted work at 16 of the 24 CCL excavation sites so these could be reviewed.

Upper Paya Lebar station was renamed to Tai Seng in July 2005. A year later, the LTA paid S$380,000 (2006) (US$239,154.15) in compensation for damaging a terrace house that the owners claimed was damaged due to construction work from the station; despite that, it argued that the damages were either natural aging of the house or present before the CCL began construction. By August 2007, the LTA closed a tender for new contractors to finish constructing Tai Seng and MacPherson stations; Econ Corp left the project in 2005 due to financial issues, and NCC International did not fulfil its contract, according to the LTA. Construction of the station had stalled since the previous year due to stricter design and engineering rules following the Nicoll Highway collapse, along with other factors such as the price of concrete increasing and an Indonesian ban on exporting sand to Singapore. The LTA appointed Chye Joo Construction to take over the project for S$17.5 million (2007) (US$11.61 million), and took NCC International to arbitration over the stalled construction.

In August 2009, Tai Seng received its Temporary Occupation Permit, indicating that it was ready to be handed over to SMRT. In the same month, transport minister Raymond Lim announced that Tai Seng, along with stations from Dhoby Ghaut to this station, will open by the first half of 2010; this was later announced to be 17 April. As announced in March, an open house was held at Tai Seng and other stations in the Dhoby Ghaut–Tai Seng stretch by the LTA on 5 April 2010. The station opened on 17 April 2010 along with the aforementioned CCL stations. In May 2017, Mapletree announced that Tai Seng station would be linked by an underground walkway to commercial hub 18 Tai Seng as part of Mapletree's developments on the property. Work on the underground walkway started in March 2015 and was expected to be completed by the second half of 2017. The new exit comes with an escalator and a lift for pedestrians' use.

== Details ==
Tai Seng station serves the CCL and is between MacPherson and Bartley stations, with the official station code of CC11. As part of the CCL, the station is operated by SMRT Trains. The station operates between 5:35 am and 12:22 am daily. Train frequencies vary from 3.5 to an average of 5.0 minutes during peak hours to an average of 6 minutes for off-peak hours. The exits of Tai Seng station are mostly wheelchair accessible. A tactile system, consisting of tiles with rounded or elongated raised studs, guides visually impaired commuters through the station, with dedicated tactile routes that connect the station entrances to the platforms. Wider fare gates allow easier access for wheelchair users into the station. The station also has bicycle facilities. Tai Seng station runs along Upper Paya Lebar Road, and has two exits serving various nearby landmarks such as Tai Seng Point, 18 Tai Seng, Leong Huat Building, Tai Seng Centre, Hudson@5Harper, J'Forte, Sakae Building, and the Breadtalk headquarters.

=== Artwork ===
External Media
- Images of Equilibrium Source: Bloomberg Connects

As part of the Art-in-Transit programme, a showcase of public artworks on the MRT, Equilibrium by Francis Ng is displayed at Tai Seng. Located at the station's platform, the artwork consists of two parallel displays of red, yellow, and blue coloured equilateral triangles in a triangular grid, with the displays reflecting off of each other. According to Ng, Equilibrium is "an extension of the interest and inquiry [he had] on site-specific areas. Drawing on the speed and rhythm of the inter-relationships found in the different level of private, public, and other spaces in this particular site, a sense of spatial 'equilibrium' is emphasised". Martin Mayo of Today stated that Equilibrium "would look good in a gallery or a museum but is wasted here", adding that the artwork's visual effect could not be seen due to brightness of the light.

Francis Ng initially conceptualised the artwork to express the themes of "parallel and opposites", "cohesion and contrast", and "symmetry and asymmetry", though later chose the theme of "equilibrium". Ng started by experimenting with primary elements for a few months such as dots, lines, and shapes, and then selected a composition of primary-coloured equilateral triangles. Between September to November 2006, the LTA organised an art competition for selected Stage 2 stations, with Equilibrium originally submitted for MacPherson station as Ng was familiar with MacPherson's surroundings, whilst Kay Kok Chung Oi submitted Virtuous Cycle for Tai Seng. Ng wanted Equilibrium to be made by fusing individual cut and coloured glass triangles, though the LTA suggested to stick together three glass panels of a single colour of triangles due to time and economic constraints; this would have eliminated the reflection effect that Ng wanted, and the installation needed for the artwork could not meet the design and engineering requirements for MacPherson as the station was designated as a civil defence shelter. After talking to an LTA executive, Ng reworked the artwork to be made out transparent acrylic panels, which provided greater depth and enhancing of the 3D effect. Despite the lightened proposal, Virtuous Cycle and Equilibrium swapped locations as the latter's weight was determined to be a potential danger during an emergency.
