= Serangoon MRT station =

Mass Rapid Transit station in Singapore

Serangoon NE12 CC13 实龙岗 சிராங்கூன்
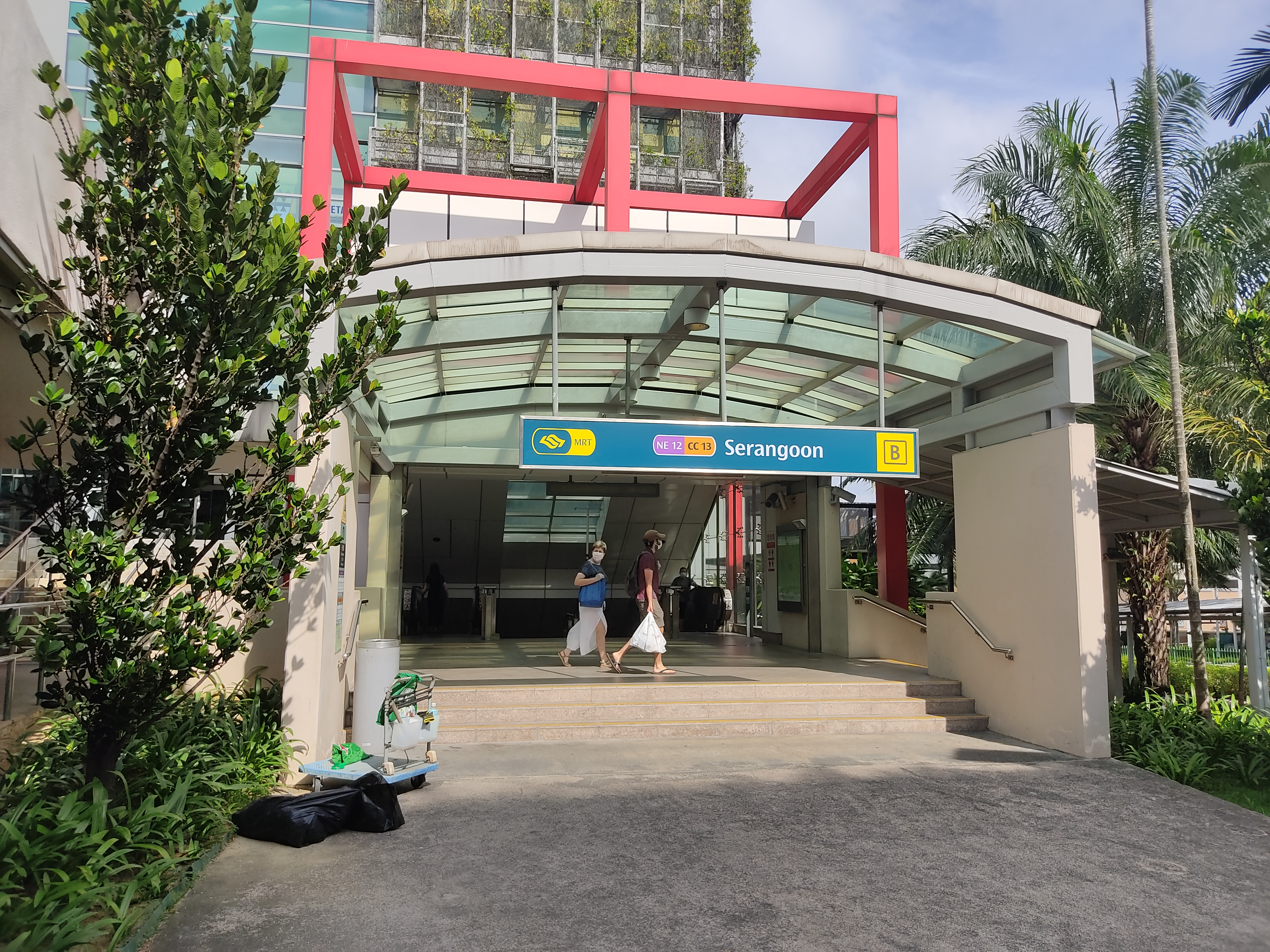
- Exit B of the station outside of the Nex shopping complex

General information
- Location: 600 Upper Serangoon Road, Singapore 534801 (NEL); 21 Serangoon Central, Singapore 556082 (CCL)
- Coordinates: 01°20′57″N 103°52′25″E
- System: Mass Rapid Transit (MRT) interchange
- Owner: Land Transport Authority
- Operator: SBS Transit (North East Line); SMRT Trains (Circle Line)
- Line: North East Line Circle Line
- Platforms: 4 (2 island platforms)
- Tracks: 4
- Connections: Serangoon, Taxi

Construction
- Structure type: Underground
- Platform levels: 2
- Parking: Yes (Nex)
- Cycle facilities: Yes
- Accessible: Yes

Other information
- Station code: SER

History
- Opened: 20 June 2003; 23 years ago (North East Line); 28 May 2009; 17 years ago (Circle Line)

Passengers
- June 2024: 51,738 per day

Services
Preceding station	Mass Rapid Transit	Following station
Woodleigh towards HarbourFront	North East Line	Kovan towards Punggol Coast
Bartley Clockwise	Circle Line	Lorong Chuan Anticlockwise
Bartley towards Dhoby Ghaut	Circle Line	Lorong Chuan towards Prince Edward Road
Track layout
Location
- Location within Singapore Rail central area

Serangoon MRT station is an underground Mass Rapid Transit (MRT) interchange station on the North East (NEL) and Circle (CCL) lines. Situated in Serangoon, Singapore along Upper Serangoon Road and Serangoon Central, the station is integrated with the Nex shopping complex and the Serangoon Bus Interchange. The station is near the Serangoon Neighbourhood Police Centre and Braddell Heights Community Hub and serves various residential estates in the area.

Preliminary studies for the NEL in the late 1980s included a tentative line alignment serving the Serangoon area. The station was confirmed in 1996; its construction involved the erection of the road viaduct above Upper Serangoon Road. In October 1999, it was announced that the station would interchange with the CCL. The NEL station was completed in June 2003. During the construction of the CCL tunnels, ground settlement caused the NEL station to sink, leading to a brief halt in excavation works. The CCL platforms opened in May 2009 as part of Stage 3 of the CCL.

The station has eight entrances, four of which are triangular and enclosed in cubic structures. The station features three artworks as part of the MRT network's Art-in-Transit programme. The NEL platforms and concourse display woodcut prints as part of Eng Joo Heng's artwork Memories of Childhood. The CCL station's concourse features the painting View of Life by Sarkasi Said, while the CCL platforms contain a set of art seats entitled Matrix.

== History ==
=== North East Line ===
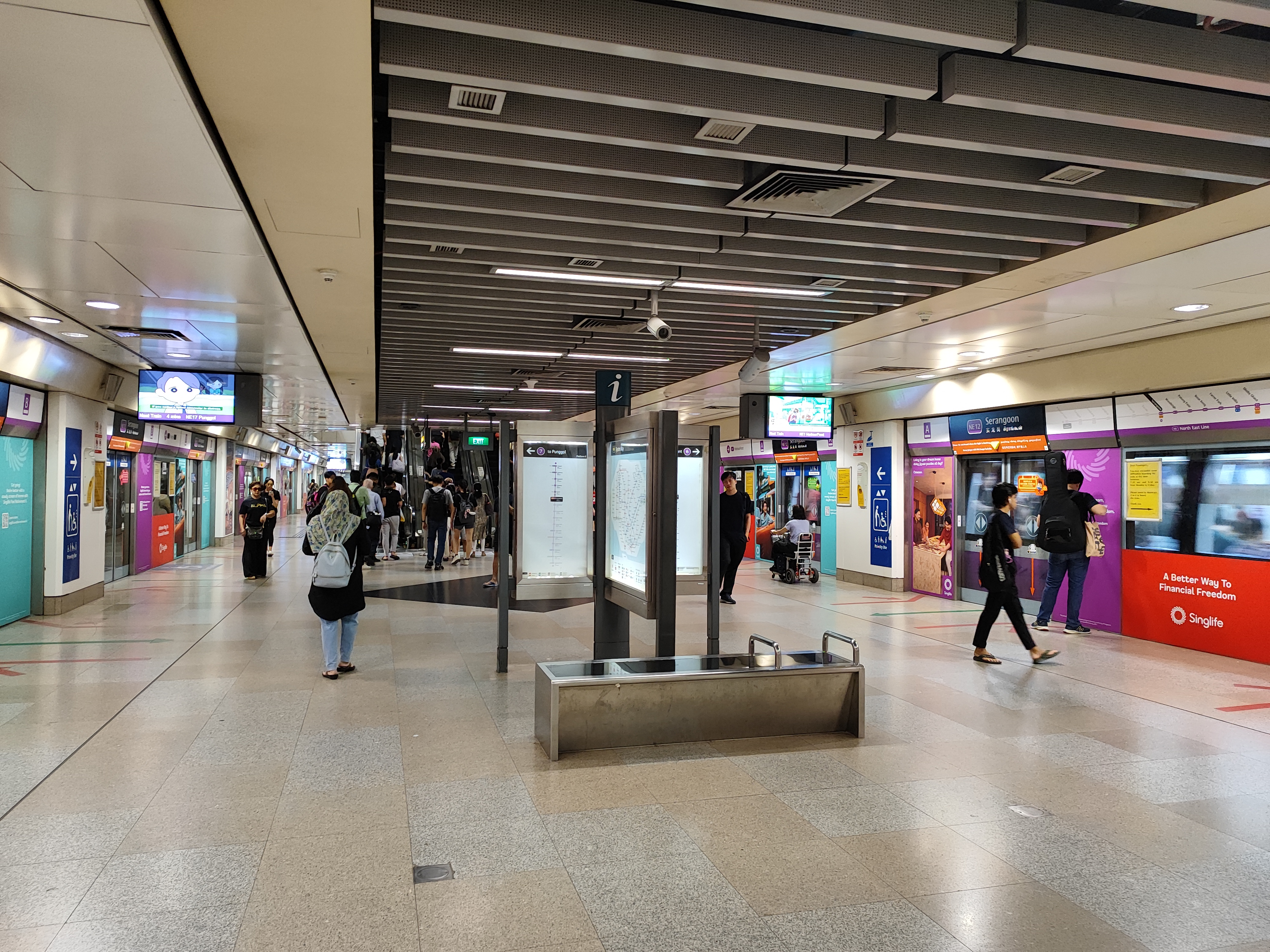
NEL platforms

In preliminary studies for the North East Line (NEL), it was planned for the line to serve the Serangoon area, traveling along Serangoon Road and Upper Serangoon Road. The line was not considered financially viable in 1989; it was only in 1996 that the Singapore government approved plans to construct the line "immediately".

Serangoon station was among the 16 NEL stations announced by communications minister Mah Bow Tan in March 1996. The contract for the construction of Serangoon station, and 2.5 km (1.6 miles) of bored tunnels, was awarded to a joint venture consisting of Wayss & Freytag AG, Econ Corporation and Chew Eu Hock Construction Co Ltd. The S$317 million (US$342 million in 2022) contract included the construction of the adjacent Woodleigh station and the vehicular viaduct along Upper Serangoon Road. The station opened on 20 June 2003.

To facilitate the station's construction, the Paya Lebar Methodist Church and Braddell Heights Community Centre were relocated. As part of the Serangoon town centre's redevelopment, the area had also been designated for commercial developments. The church moved to a larger site of 6,260 m^{2} (7,490 sq yd), allowing it to expand its premises. The community centre relocated closer to the town centre, sharing premises with the Singapore National Wushu Federation. A few public facilities were taken over, and new carpark lots and a new basketball court were built as replacements.

As workers diverted Upper Serangoon Road for the construction works, the road capacity was maintained using the adjacent road reserve spaces. The scope of the project also involved building the new road viaduct above Upper Serangoon Road. Hence, the works had to be carefully scheduled to take into account the various technical aspects of each part of the project. The tunnels were bored first, and the station's roof slab was finished afterward. The pillars for the road viaduct were installed above ground after the roof slab was completed.

The area's grassroots leaders conveyed residents' complaints about the construction noises to the Land Transport Authority (LTA). In response, the LTA explained the work progress and assured the residents that the inconvenience was temporary; the completion of the MRT station would make the area more convenient. The contractors monitored the surrounding residential buildings to ensure that the foundations were not affected.

=== Circle Line ===
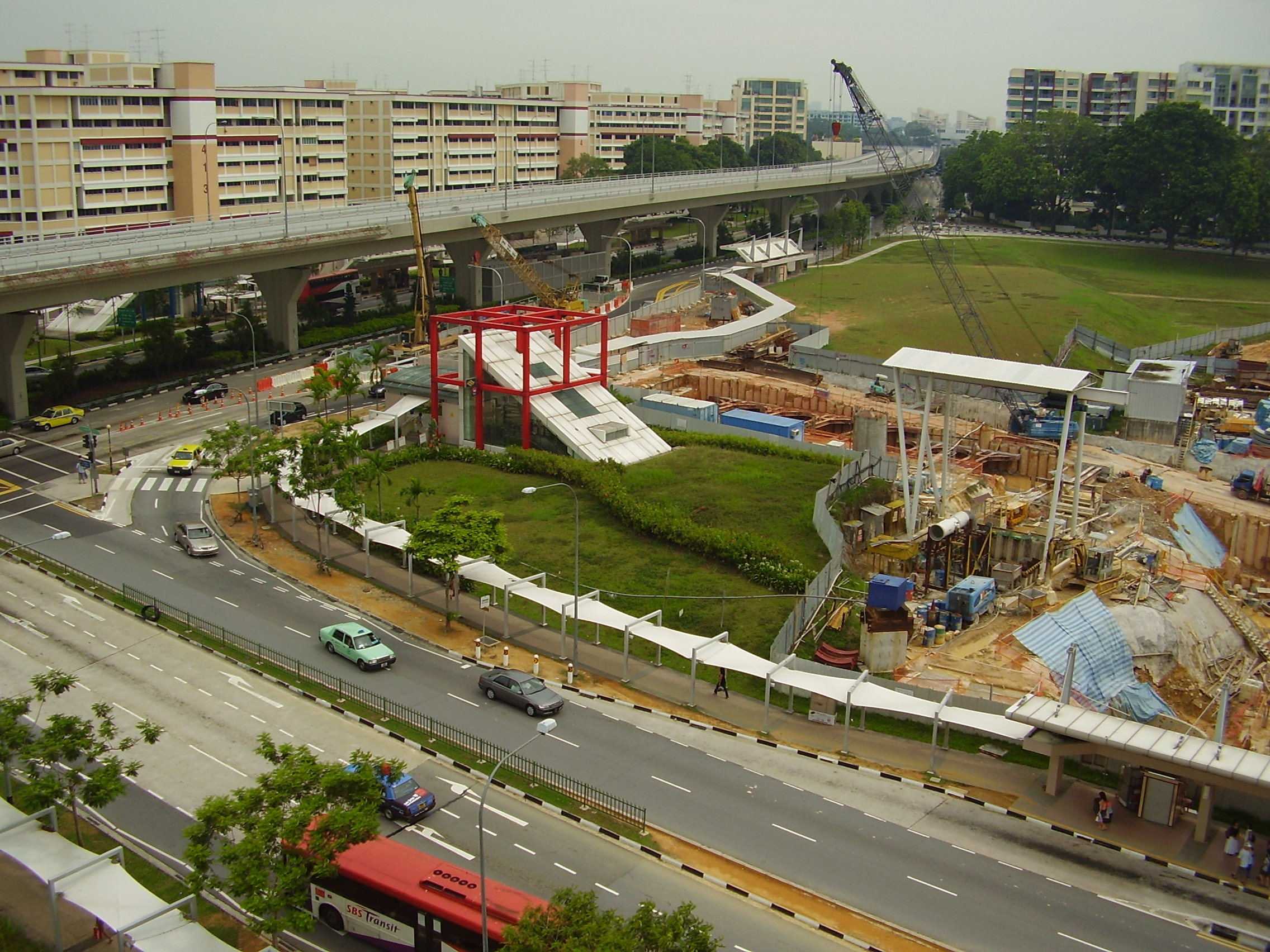
Construction site of the CCL station in April 2006

In October 1999, it was announced that Serangoon station would interchange with a proposed MRT line linking Buona Vista and Paya Lebar via Bishan and Serangoon. Provisions were made for the existing NEL station to link with the future Circle Line (CCL) platforms. In January 2003, the LTA announced that Serangoon CCL station would be constructed as part of CCL Stage 3 (CCL3). The 5.7-kilometre (3.5-mile) segment consisted of five stations, between the Bartley and Marymount stations, and was expected to be completed by early 2008. The contract for the construction of the CCL station was awarded to a joint venture of Shanghai Tunnel Engineering Co (Singapore) Pte Ltd, Woh Hup and Alpine Mayreder. The S$155.95 million (US$90 million) contract included the construction of 3.8 kilometres (2.4 miles) of bored tunnels.

Due to a build-up of pressure while boring the CCL tunnels, white foam appeared at the junction of Serangoon Avenue 2 and Avenue 3, leading to the temporary closure of one lane at the junction in February 2005. Tunneling works were suspended to ease the pressure build-up. As the tunnels underneath the NEL station were being excavated later that month, the contractors encountered a large amount of groundwater that seeped into the work site. This led to ground settlement and the sinking of the NEL station by one centimetre (0.39 in). Excavation works were suspended as water was being pumped out. As a precautionary measure, NEL trains had to slow down when arriving or departing from the station. The tunnel was redesigned, and new construction methods such as jet grouting and a more comprehensive monitoring system were implemented to detect any further settlement of the NEL tunnels and the viaduct.

With the Nicoll Highway collapse in April 2004, the opening of the entire line was expected to be delayed to 2010, as the LTA hoped to open all five stages at once. In January 2008, transport minister Raymond Lim announced that CCL3 would open by the middle of 2009. As later announced by the transport minister in February 2009, CCL3 opened for service on 28 May 2009.

As part of a joint emergency preparedness exercise by the LTA and train operators SBS Transit and SMRT, security screenings were held at this station on 7 December 2021. The screening machines deployed for the exercise included metal detectors and X-Ray machines to check commuters' belongings. Such exercises were conducted to test established response protocols and maintain vigilance for quicker and more effective responses during emergencies and heightened security situations.

== Station details ==
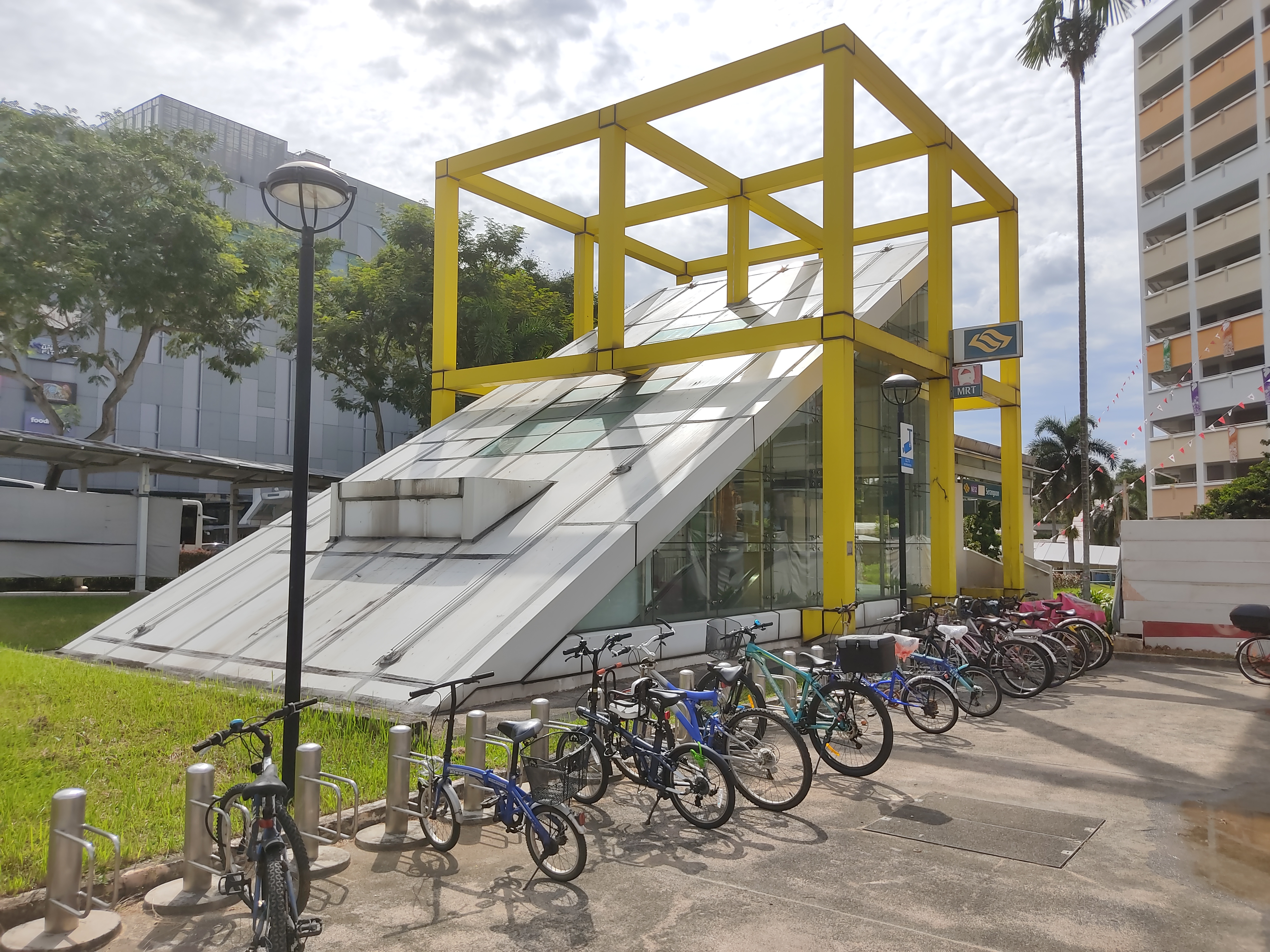
Exit C of the station encased in a cubic structure

Serangoon station is an interchange on the NEL and the CCL; its official station code is NE12/CC13. On the NEL, the station is between the Woodleigh and Kovan stations. On the CCL, the station is between the Bartley and Lorong Chuan stations. The station serves the Serangoon area. The NEL station is underneath Upper Serangoon Road at the junction with Serangoon Central, while the CCL station is underneath the Nex shopping complex.

The station has eight entrances. Four of the entrances are triangular, each encased in a cubic structure which are painted in different colours to mark each entrance. The station is integrated with the Serangoon Bus Interchange and the commercial development of Nex as part of the Serangoon Integrated Transport Hub. Surrounding the station are educational institutions such as St. Gabriel's Secondary School, Yangzheng Primary School and Zhonghua Secondary School, alongside public amenities such as Serangoon Neighbourhood Police Centre, Braddell Heights Community Hub, Braddell Heights Fire Post, Marine Parade Town Council and the Serangoon Central Post Office. Residential developments around the station include Sunshine Terrace, La Belle and Forest Woods Residences.

The NEL and CCL platforms are wheelchair-accessible. A tactile system, consisting of tiles with rounded or elongated raised studs, guides visually impaired commuters through the station, with dedicated routes that connect the station entrances to the platforms or between the lines. Wide fare gates allow easier access for wheelchair users into the station. The pair of travellators linking the NEL and CCL platforms are one of the longest in the Singapore MRT network at 73 metres (240 ft).

The NEL station is designated as a Civil Defence (CD) shelter. It is designed to accommodate at least 7,500 people and can withstand airstrikes and chemical attacks. Equipment essential for the operations in the CD shelter is mounted on shock absorbers to prevent damage during a bombing. When electrical supply to the shelter is disrupted, there are backup generators to keep operations going. The shelter has dedicated built-in decontamination chambers and dry toilets with collection bins that will send human waste out of the shelter.

== Station artwork ==
The station displays three artworks as part of the MRT network's Art-in-Transit programme – a showcase of public artworks on the MRT network. Another mural is displayed at this station as part of SMRT’s Comic Connect series – a public art showcase of heritage-themed murals by the train operator.

=== Memories of Childhood ===
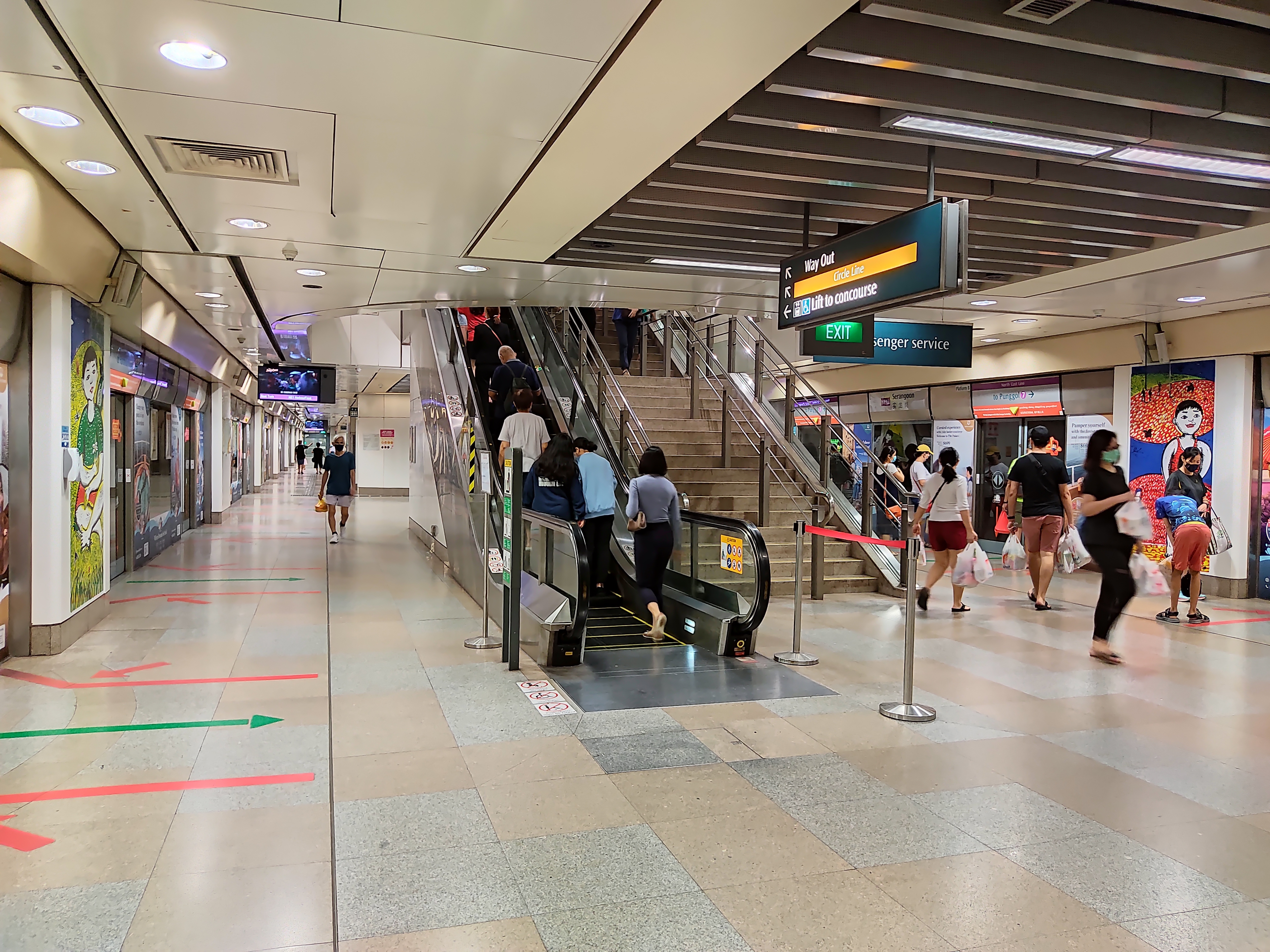
Two prints are displayed on the pillars along the two sides of the platforms

Eng Joo Heng's Memories of Childhood is a series of woodcut prints displayed in silk screens or vitreous enamel wall panels at the NEL platforms and concourse. Various children are depicted as playing with dragonfiles and puppies. Eng intended for his work to connect to various generations and allow observers to look back happily at their childhoods, with the older generation passing on to their children stories about the kampung days.

Through his former work as a printmaker at a Parisian art studio, Eng had explored the possibilities of printmaking and used the technique for this work. The artist enjoyed the simplicity of the technique, which did not require complex tools or machinery and could be done anywhere. He felt that the wood textures produced would leave a strong impression on commuters. His early sketches on paper had more specific symbolism related to the theme of childhood but were later revised to more generic images for all commuters to appreciate. Primary colours were predominantly used, giving vibrancy to the artwork. The colours also reflect children's crayon drawings and their view of the world, as well as the colours used at the station's entrances. The work was crafted during school holidays and weekends, as Eng preferred to work in daylight to have a better view of his work.

=== View of Life ===
Displayed at the CCL concourse level, View of Life by Sarkasi Said is a batik painting of various colours in strokes intending to express movements of change and nature. Inspired by the lalangs that used to grow in the Serangoon area, the work was intended to reflect the artist's love of batik painting.

Feeling that Singapore's development was underappreciated, Sarkasi decided to create a painting that reflects the "optimism, joy and vitality" of the country's achievements. Initially, the artist wanted to do an impressionist painting, but eventually decided to challenge commuters to think of art "beyond just aesthetics", giving them a learning experience on art as they "communicate what they see" from the work. The type of each brush stroke on the painting depended on the artist's movements and character. The coloured wax was splashed on the white canvas. Using wax-resist, the artist treated each splash with chemicals to dye the colour on the canvas made of thick denim material.

Created in Sarkasi's studio in Indonesia, the work involved nature. The dyes needed sunlight to bring out the colour, with varying weather conditions affecting how the colours came out. With concerns of possible damage the painting might face due to constant exposure to commuter traffic, a photographed digital copy was installed at the station. Even if the original work was protected by glass, the panels might still break. The painting was photographed, printed and laminated before being mounted on the station walls. The original was donated to the museum at the National University of Singapore. Some of the panels were mounted upside down, but Sarkasi corrected the panels' alignments.

=== Matrix ===
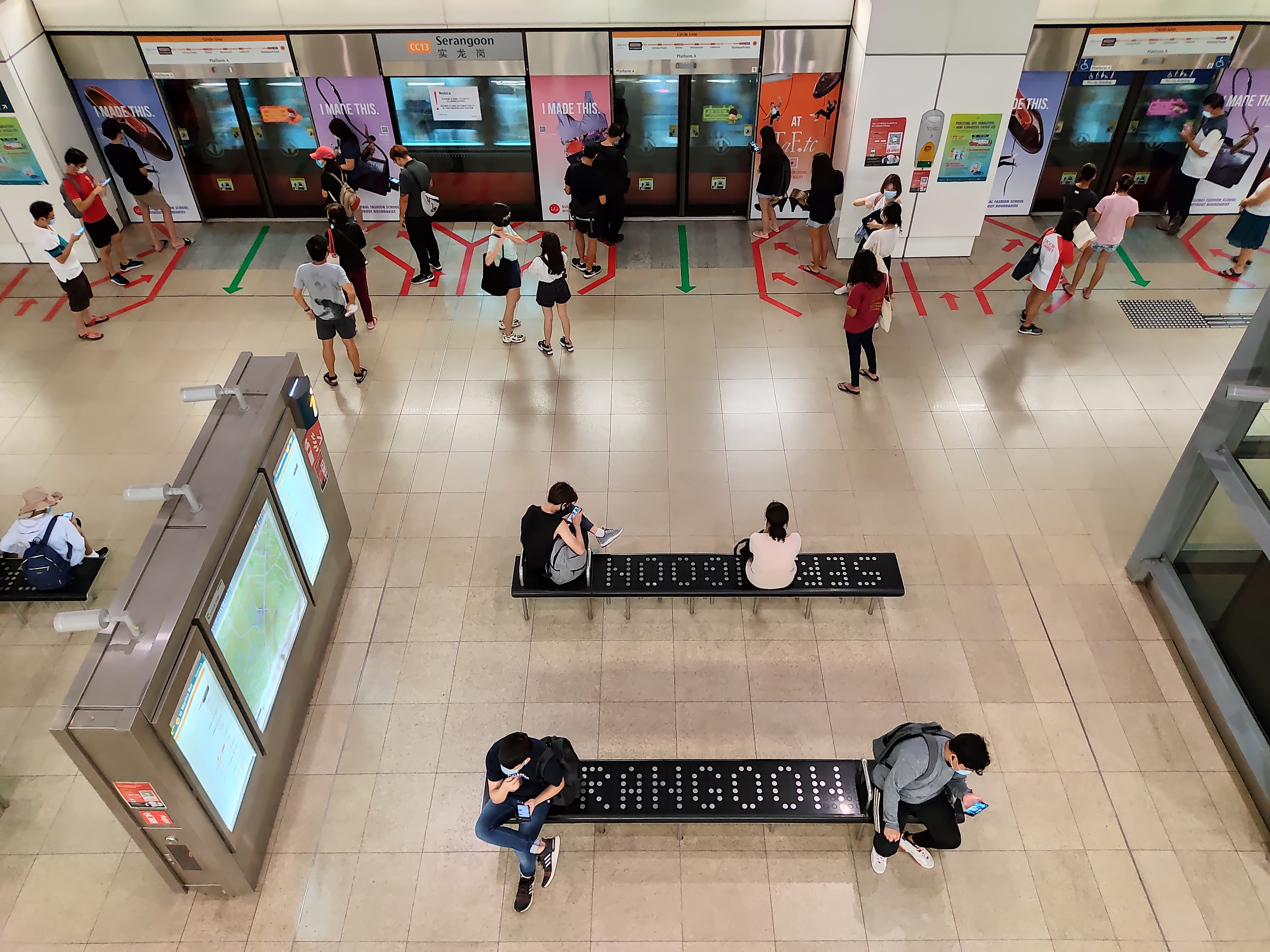
Matrix art seats at the CCL platforms

The CCL platforms of Serangoon station feature a set of "art seats" entitled Matrix. Though the platform seats are intended to be works of art, they are designed to remain functional and practical. This work by Lui Honfay and Yasmine Chan, along with Rain, was selected through the International Art Seats Design Competition in 2006. Matrix consists of a series of benches engraved with the station name in a dot-matrix style on the seat surface. The dot-matrix system was adopted as it was flexible enough to be mass-produced for use in many stations. The intriguing combination of signage and seat "impressed" the judges who awarded it the top prize.

=== Serangoon Through the Years ===
As part of SMRT's Comic Connect series, Serangoon Through the Years by students from the Singapore School of the Arts depicts various historic landmarks of the Hougang–Serangoon area. Featured at the mural's forefront are members of Force 136 and war hero Lim Bo Seng, whose family lived at Sixth Milestone at the junction of Upper Serangoon Road and Tampines Road. Also depicted on the mural is the rainbow façade of a public flat at Hougang Avenue 7, which was among the first residential blocks built during Hougang's redevelopment in the 1980s. Other landmarks include the former Lim Tua Tow Market and a rubber plantation in the artwork background.
