= Bartley Road =

Road in Singapore

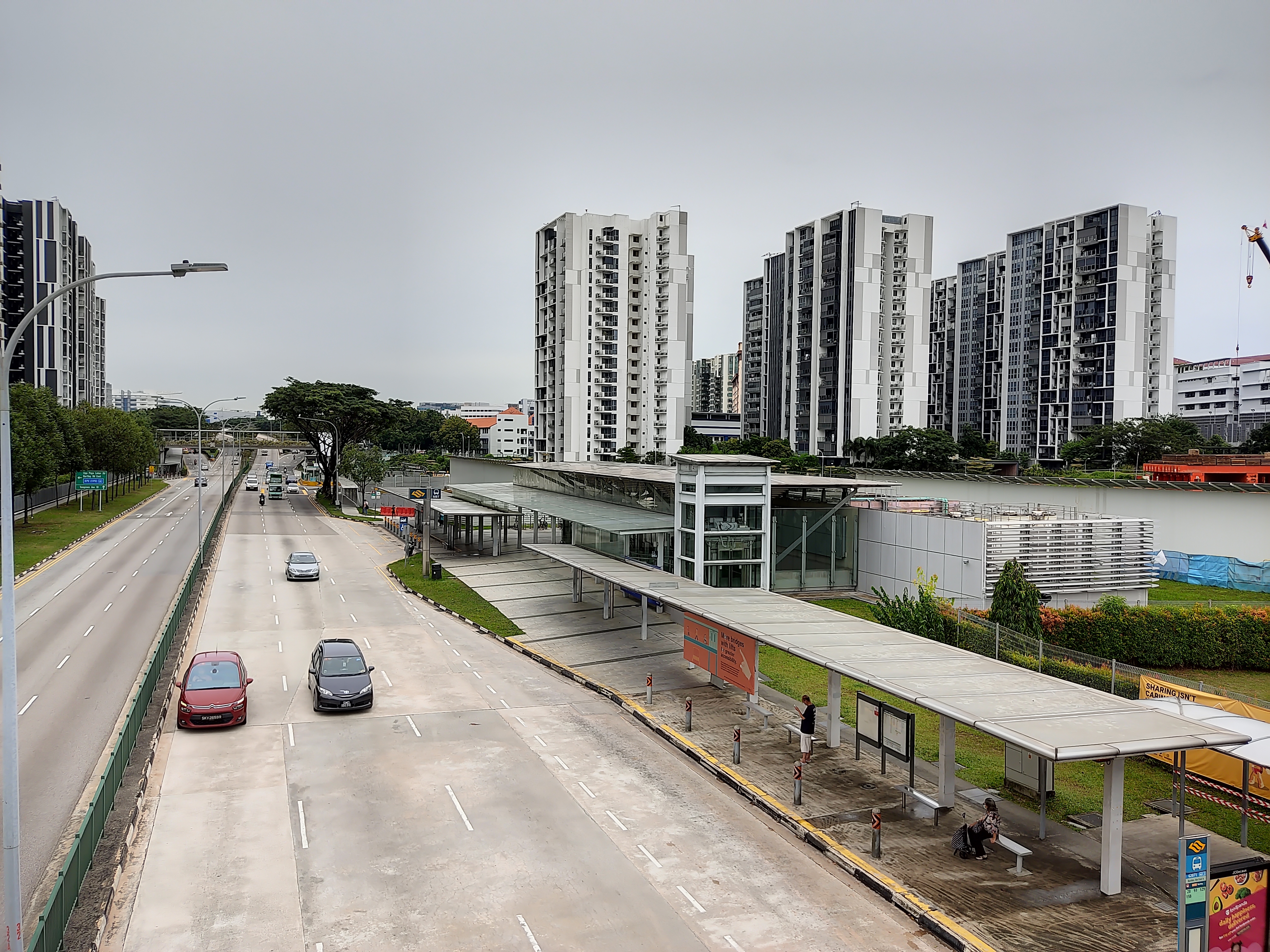
- A bus stop along Bartley Road near Bartley MRT station
- Interactive map of Bartley Road
- Namesake: William Bartley
- Length: 5.8 km (3.6 mi)
- Coordinates: 1.34345°N 103.87865°E

Bartley Road is a major road in Singapore extending from Upper Serangoon Road to Tampines Avenue 10. The road has a distance span of 5.8km. En route, it passes through the areas of Serangoon, Bartley, Paya Lebar, Defu, Kaki Bukit, and Bedok Reservoir.

== History ==
Bartley Road was officially named after William Bartley (1885–1961) in 1940. Bartley was Acting Collector-General of Income Tax in the 1920s and President of the Municipal Commission of Singapore between 1931 and 1946.

In 2023, Bartley Road was gradually raised to line up with Bidadari Park Drive.

== Sections ==
Bartley Road is split into three sections with the dividers at Upper Paya Lebar Road and Kaki Bukit Avenue 4. The three sections are the original Bartley Road, Paya Lebar Viaduct, and Bartley Road East (Kaki Bukit Viaduct).

=== Bartley Road ===
With a distance of 1.5km, the original stretch of Bartley Road extending from Upper Serangoon Road to Upper Paya Lebar Road, was also a part of the Outer Ring Road System.

=== Paya Lebar Viaduct ===
With a distance of 2.2km, the Paya Lebar Viaduct section extending from Upper Paya Lebar Road to Airport Road, has a 1.3km four-lane carriageway long viaduct above the road. The viaduct also has a slip road at the Hougang Avenue 3 junction. The contract was initially awarded to L&M Prestressing and was originally scheduled for completion by end-2004. However, work slowed in 2002 because L&M encountered financial problems.L&M then promised that the viaduct would be completed by 2006. As soon as the 2006 extended dateline was not met, LTA awarded Hock Lian Seng in 2006 to finish the delayed project and was completed in January 2010 after a delay of five years.

=== Bartley Road East ===
With a distance of 2.1km, Bartley Road East or Kaki Bukit Viaduct, is a viaduct starting from Kaki Bukit Avenue 4 and ends at the junction of Tampines Avenue 10 and Bedok Reservoir Road. It was opened to traffic on 30 December 2003.

== Bartley Road Extension Project ==
Started in December 2000 and completed on 17 January 2010, the Bartley Road Extension Project consist of building new roads to connect Tampines Avenue 10 and Upper Serangoon Road with two viaducts.

After completion, it now provides a direct link from Tampines to Upper Serangoon Road—helping to alleviate the heavy traffic conditions along Pan Island Expressway (PIE) and Bedok Reservoir Road during peak hours, as well as providing an alternative access from Paya Lebar to Tampines. By travelling along Bartley Road East itself, it can save about ten minutes of travelling time and cut down the travelling distance of about 500 m compared to before.

The project was divided into two phases: Kaki Bukit Viaduct phase and Paya Lebar Viaduct phase. The Kaki Bukit Viaduct phase was completed in the third quarter of 2003 and the Paya Lebar phase was completed on 17 January 2010.

== Landmarks ==
Landmarks along the road, from east to west, include Upper Serangoon Viaduct, Maris Stella High School, Bartley MRT station, Bartley Christian Church, Bartley Secondary School, Kim Chuan Depot, Paya Lebar Air Base, Singapore Ramakrishna Mission, and Bedok Reservoir Park.
