= Minister of Health and Social Services =

Minister of Health and Social Services can refer to:

- Minister of Health and Community Services (Manitoba)
- Minister of Health and Social Services (Northern Ireland)
- Minister of Health and Social Services (Nunavut)
- Ministry of Health and Social Services (Quebec)
