= Marymount MRT station =

Mass Rapid Transit station in Singapore

Marymount CC16 玛丽蒙 மேரிமவுண்ட்
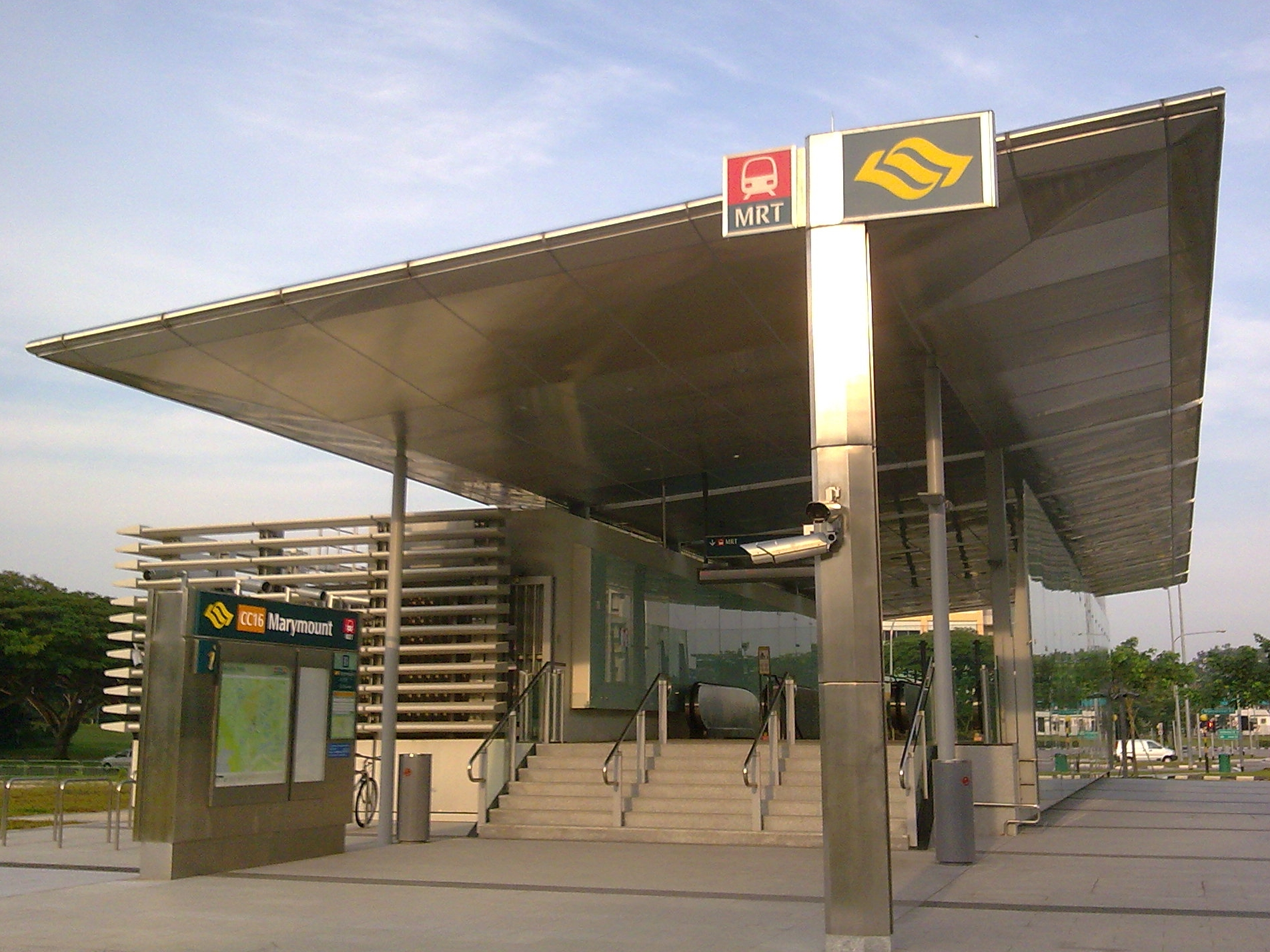
- Exit B of Marymount MRT station

General information
- Location: 60 Marymount Road, Singapore 573993
- Coordinates: 01°20′57″N 103°50′22″E
- System: Mass Rapid Transit (MRT) station
- Owner: Land Transport Authority
- Operator: SMRT Trains
- Line: Circle Line
- Platforms: 2 (1 island platform)
- Tracks: 2
- Connections: Bus, Taxi

Construction
- Structure type: Underground
- Platform levels: 1
- Cycle facilities: Yes
- Accessible: Yes (except for Exit B)

Other information
- Station code: MRM

History
- Opened: 28 May 2009; 17 years ago
- Former names: Shunfu, Pemimpin

Passengers
- June 2024: 6,610 per day

Services
Preceding station	Mass Rapid Transit	Following station
Bishan Clockwise	Circle Line	Caldecott Anticlockwise
Bishan towards Dhoby Ghaut	Circle Line	Caldecott towards Prince Edward Road
Track layout
Location
- Location within Singapore Rail central area

Marymount MRT station is an underground Mass Rapid Transit (MRT) station on the Circle Line (CCL) in Bishan, Singapore. Operated by SMRT, it serves nearby landmarks such as Bishan Fire Station, Raffles Institution, and Raffles Junior College. Superstring by Joshua Yang, which features three pieces drawn using one continuous line, is displayed at this station as part of the Art in Transit programme.

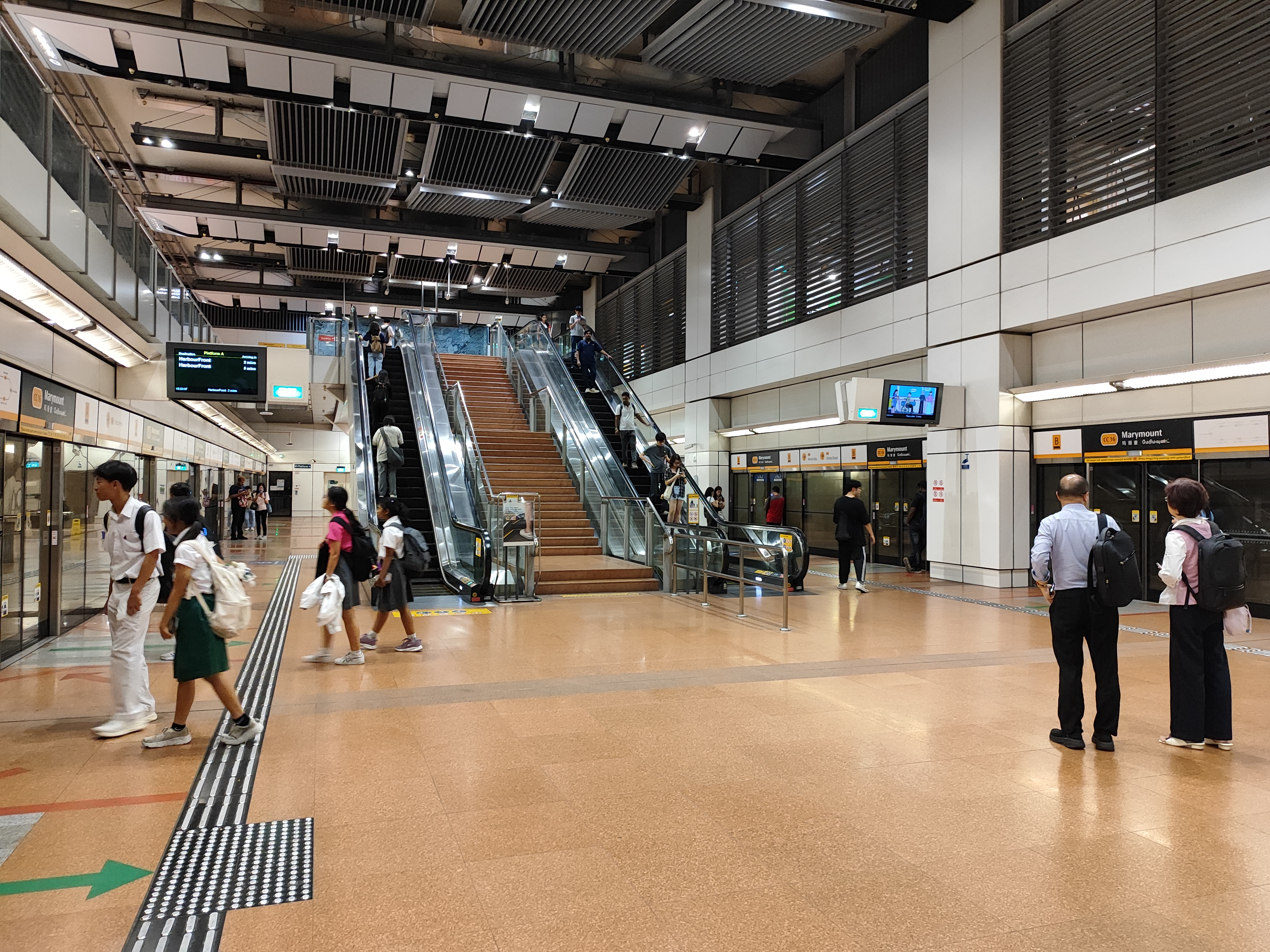
Platforms

Announced in January 2003 as part of Stage 3 of the Circle Line (CCL), construction started in the third quarter of 2003 with an expected completion date of 2008. The expected completion date was delayed to 2009 after the Nicoll Highway collapse halted the stage's construction until August 2005. After further changes to the stage's opening date, Marymount commenced operations alongside other Stage 3 stations on 28 May 2009. Marymount was the terminus of the CCL until the opening of Stages 4 and 5 on 8 October 2011, which extended the CCL to HarbourFront.

== History ==
In October 1999, the Land Transport Authority (LTA) announced that the Outer Circle Line, a rail line connecting Paya Lebar, Serangoon, Bishan, and Buona Vista stations, was under study. The rail line was expected to be operational by 2006. There were also plans for the Marina Line, another planned rail line, to be extended from Stadium Boulevard station to connect to the Outer Circle Line at Paya Lebar. The Marina Line and the Outer Circle Line would be merged to create the CCL, which had a length of 34 kilometres (21 mi), in April 2001. In January 2003, it was announced that Marymount would be part of CCL Stage 3, a 5.7 kilometres (3.5 mi) stretch between it and Bartley. The segment was expected to cost S$1.2 billion (2003) (US$688.79 million).

By August, Contract C853 for the construction of Marymount station and its tunnels had been awarded to Taisei Corporation for S$167.7 million (2003) (US$96.26 million). Construction started for Stage 3 stations in the third quarter of 2003 with expected completion by 2008. However, the Nicoll Highway collapse, which occurred in April 2004, delayed the expected opening of the stage to 2009. The LTA halted work at 16 of the 24 CCL excavation sites so they could be reviewed. In July 2005, the LTA announced that Marymount station would retain its name after a public consultation exercise conducted last year. Despite it not being listed as a choice, the majority of respondents preferred the station to be called "Marymount" as it was easily identifiable compared to alternatives such as "Shunfu" and "Pemimpin".

On 26 August 2005, construction for Stage 3 stations restarted, with the LTA projecting that Stage 3 would be constructed by 2008. By then, 70% of the station's excavation works had been completed. In January 2006, it was expected that tunnelling works for Stage 3 stations would be finished by the end of the year. It was also expected that Marymount and the other Stage 3 stations would be opened by early 2009. By September 2007, The Straits Times (ST) was reporting that the Stage 3 stations were "in advanced stages of completion", with architectural, engineering, and mechanical works being carried out and expected to be finished by mid-2008. In January 2008, the Stage 3 stations' completion date was moved earlier from 2010 to mid-2009. The LTA hosted a tour for Thomson residents to visit Marymount station in June that year. The residents were shown the non-public areas such as the ventilation and monitoring systems rooms, and the tour included a walk along the cross passage tunnel.

In the same month, the LTA started conducting test runs on the Stage 3 stations, with the completion of construction expected by November, and the beginning of operations by June 2009. Construction for the Stage 3 stations was more than 90% completed by October, according to Lim Yong and Desmond Wee of ST. In February 2009, transport minister Raymond Lim announced that CCL Stage 3 would open on 30 May, though it was later moved to 28 May. On 28 May 2009, Marymount commenced operations alongside other Stage 3 stations. Marymount was the terminus of the CCL until the line was extended to HarbourFront on 8 October 2011.

== Details ==
Marymount station serves the CCL and is between Bishan and Caldecott stations, with the official station code of CC16. As part of the CCL, the station is operated by SMRT Trains. The station operates between 5:25 am and 12:34 am daily. Train frequencies vary from 3.5 to 5.0 minutes during peak hours to an average of 6 minutes for off-peak hours. Marymount station is partially wheelchair accessible. A tactile system, consisting of tiles with rounded or elongated raised studs, guides visually impaired commuters through the station, with dedicated tactile routes that connect the station entrances to the platforms. Wider fare gates allow easier access for wheelchair users into the station. The station also has bicycle facilities. Marymount station is near the junction of Marymount Lane, Marymount Road, and Bishan Street 21, and has two exits serving various nearby landmarks such as the Bishan Fire Station, TMC Academy, and St. Theresa's Home. It is also near Raffles Institution and Raffles Junior College.

External Media
- A map of Marymount's location Source: Land Transport Authority (LTA)
- Visual model of Marymount station Source: LTA
- Images of Superstring Source: Bloomberg Connects

=== Artwork ===
As part of the Art in Transit programme, a showcase of public artworks on the MRT, Superstring by Joshua Yang, is displayed at Marymount. There are three pieces as part of this artwork, each made of a single, continuous line. Yang intended the line to represent a train journey, a connection to the MRT system, and a "record of time". The largest piece, located above the ticketing machines, is a 5 × 8.4 m (16 × 28 ft) piece featuring "child-like" drawings of the sun, along with a singing bird and cryptic messages on babies and saving water. These represented Yang's thoughts as he was watching a politician's speech on television whilst drawing that piece. The piece also displays a blueprint of the station, as well as the dimensions of the glass panels displaying the artwork. The two other pieces, each measuring 4 metres (13 ft) wide, are located at the station's exits. Both pieces feature drawings of the access panels behind the wall displaying the pieces, with the pieces' continuous line creating an illusion of three-dimensional space. Mayo Martin of TODAY commented that Superstring "is sleeker and clean and doesn't have that gritty, nervous energy found in this series' previous incarnations", adding that they were nearly going to skip the artwork until they saw the pieces at Marymount's exits.

Between September and November 2006, the LTA organised an art competition for certain CCL stations as part of a S$4.8 million (2006) (US$3.02 million) plan to install artworks on the CCL, with Superstring as one of the competition's winners. Yang visited Marymount station during its construction, and initially proposed an alternative artwork that featured the faces and names of the station's construction workers, though the Art Review Panel preferred Superstring as it was "more 'neutral' in depicting the station's construction process", according to writer Justin Zhuang. Each piece took three months to complete. Although Yang had drawn continuous line drawings in the past, Superstring was the first time Yang worked with glass, with Yang making the lines transparent to accentuate the other side of the glass panels. The pieces were originally going to be made through sandblasting, though initial testing revealed that sandblasting caused samples of the artwork to lose details as the drawings were too fine. It also caused some of the panels to shatter. The production of Superstring was delayed for months, leading the LTA to print the artwork on laminated glass, similar to other artworks in CCL stations.
