= Beatty Secondary School =

- 博理中学; Sekolah Menengah Beatty பீட்டி உயர்நிலை பள்ளி

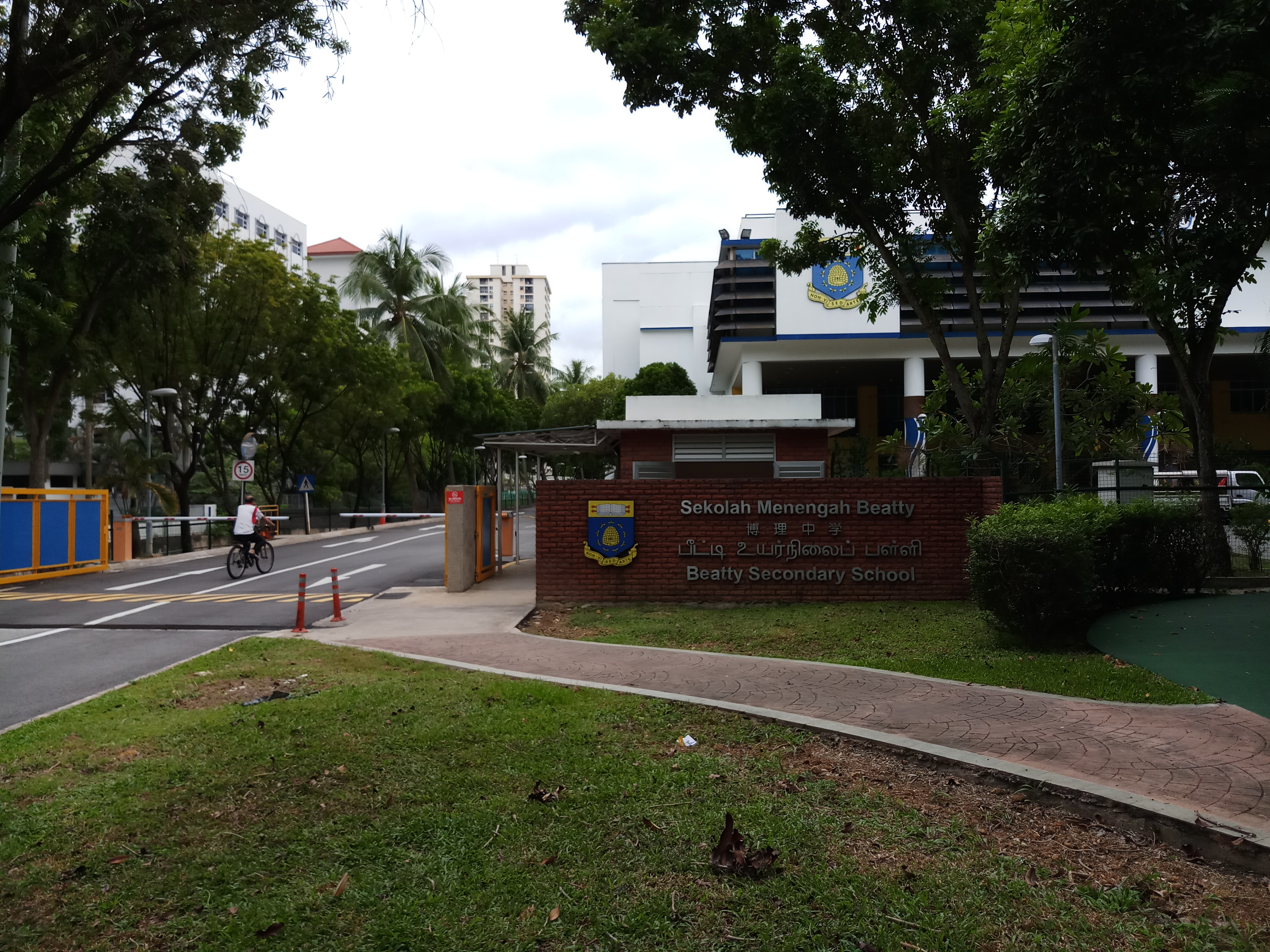

Location
- 1 Toa Payoh North; Singapore 318990; Singapore; 1°20′31.47″N 103°51′7.55″E

Information
- Type: Government
- Motto: Non Vi Sed Arte, Not with force but with skill
- Established: 1953; 73 years ago
- Session: Single
- School code: 3003
- Principal: Harman Johll
- Enrolment: 1300+
- Colour: Navy Blue Yellow
- Website: beattysec.moe.edu.sg

Beatty Secondary School is a co-educational government secondary school in Toa Payoh, Singapore. It was established in 1953 along Beatty Road and moved to its current site in Toa Payoh in 1982.

It educates deaf students who must use sign language to communicate.

== History ==
The school was originally opened on 6 July 1953 at a site along Beatty Road, with three classes. It was the fourth school established as part of the then-government's 10-year Education Plan. In 1957, the school's female student population was transferred to the then-new Cedar Girls' Secondary School. That same year, post-primary classes for students who were unable to get into secondary schools were started in the school.

In 1982, the school moved to a new location in Toa Payoh North. The new building was constructed at a cost of S$7.5 million, and featured administrative, science, and workshop blocks as well as 28 classrooms.

The graduated cohort of 2008 presented the school with the best overall results in the GCE 'O' Level examinations throughout the school's 55 years of history. Average L1B5 value stands at 18, making it a Band 9 school.

=== Assimilation of Balestier Hill Secondary School ===
In 2016, due to a lack of Secondary One students, Beatty Secondary School had been selected to merge with Balestier Hill Secondary School. This process was made in ease with the integration of Beatty's students and of Balestier Hill's students nearing the end of 2016.

Beatty took responsibility for the deaf students formerly educated at Balestier Hill and Boon Lay Secondary School. The government decided that it was best to concentrate deaf students who must sign to communicate at one school as only about 15 secondary students were in that category.

== Identity and culture ==
=== School crest and colours ===
The school colours are those of Admiral David Beatty, and the crest, which depicts a beehive encircled by bees, is taken from his family's coat of arms. These symbolise unity and the hard work required for one to achieve success. Above the beehive is an open book symbolizing knowledge

=== School motto ===
The school motto, "Non Vi Sed Arte", or "Not with force but with skill", was also taken from Beatty's coat of arms.

== Academic Information ==
Being an integrated secondary school, Beatty Secondary School offers three academic streams, namely the four-year Express course, as well as the Normal Course, comprising Normal (Academic) and Normal (Technical) academic tracks.

=== O Level Express Course ===
The Express Course is a nationwide four-year programme that leads up to the Singapore-Cambridge GCE Ordinary Level examination.

=== Normal Course ===
The Normal Course is a nationwide 5-year programme leading to the Singapore-Cambridge GCE Normal Level examination, which runs either the Normal (Academic) curriculum or Normal (Technical) curriculum, abbreviated as N(A) and N(T) respectively.

==== Normal (Academic) Course ====
In the Normal (Academic) course, students offer 5-8 subjects in the Singapore-Cambridge GCE Normal Level examination. Compulsory subjects include:

- English Language
- Mother Tongue Language
- Mathematics
- Combined Humanities
- Chemistry

A 5th year leading to the Singapore-Cambridge GCE Ordinary Level examination is available to N(A) students who perform well in their Singapore-Cambridge GCE Normal Level examination. Students can move from one course to another based on their performance and the assessment of the school principal and teachers.

==== Normal (Technical) Course ====
The Normal (Technical) course prepares students for a technical-vocational education at the Institute of Technical Education. Students will offer 5-7 subjects in the Singapore-Cambridge GCE Normal Level examination. The curriculum is tailored towards strengthening students’ proficiency in English and Mathematics. Students take English Language, Mathematics, Basic Mother Tongue, and Computer Applications as compulsory subjects.

== Media mentions ==
Interviewed on Channel News Asia in February 2007, in a discussion on school upgrading, principal Boo Hian Kok expressed the view that schools should continue to ask for better facilities, provided they are able to justify their requests and prove they will benefit the students and teachers.

== Notable alumni ==
- Isa Ibrahim, Bruneian lawyer and politician
- Sarkasi Said, Singaporean contemporary batik artist
- Shih Choon Fong, professor, university administrator
