= Bartley Secondary School =

Location
- 10 Jalan Bunga Rampai; Singapore 538403
- 1.3403°N 103.8828°E

Information
- Type: Public; Government
- Motto: Facta Non Verba (Latin) (Deeds not words)
- Established: 18 February 1952; 74 years ago
- School code: 3002
- Principal: Britta Seet Ying Ling
- Gender: Mixed
- Age: 13 to 17
- Enrolment: 1,100
- Campus: Urban, 3 ha (7.4 acres)
- Colour: Blue
- Website: bartleysec.moe.edu.sg

Bartley Secondary School is a co-educational government secondary school in Singapore.

It was founded in 1952, and is named after William Bartley (1885–1961), who was acting collector-general of income tax in the 1920s and president of the Municipal Commission of Singapore between 1931 and 1946.

== History ==
=== Founding ===
The school was founded on 18 February 1952 with Chua Leong Hean serving as the first principal and an enrolment of 81 male and 10 female students.

The school was named after William Bartley (1885–1961), who was acting collector-general of income tax in the 1920s and president of the Municipal Commission of Singapore between 1931 and 1946.

The construction of the science laboratories, school hall and tuck shops were completed in 1955.

In 1956, the female student population of Bartley was transferred to Cedar Girls' Secondary School, with the school becoming a boys' school in the secondary section. Post-secondary section was also started in that year, and female students were admitted into the pre-university level.

=== Conversion into a co-educational school ===
In 1992, the school moved to the former Mount Vernon Secondary School premises while a new school was built. In 1995, Bartley moved to new premises at 10 Jalan Bunga Rampai, and began admitting girls at the secondary level again that year. Pre-university section were phased out from the school in 1996. The school was upgraded under the PRIME scheme on its present site from 2003 to 2005. The new school had facilities such as a dental clinic, a new school hall, additional classrooms and a library with a cafe.

The school was banded for the first time in the annual school ranking exercise by the Ministry of Education (MOE) in 2009. The school attributed this success to a lower student-teacher ratio.

Due to the low student enrolment, the school merged with First Toa Payoh Secondary School in 2016. An exhibition of the achievements and heritage of First Toa Payoh Secondary was set up.

== Academic information ==
Being an integrated secondary school, Bartley Secondary School offers three academic courses, namely the four-year Express course, as well as the Normal Course, comprising the Normal (Academic) and Normal (Technical) academic tracks.

=== O Level Express Course ===
The Express Course is a nationwide four-year programme that leads up to the Singapore-Cambridge GCE Ordinary Level examination.

=== Normal Course ===
The Normal Course is a nationwide four-to-five-year programme leading to the Singapore-Cambridge GCE Normal Level examination, which runs either the Normal (Academic) curriculum or Normal (Technical) curriculum, abbreviated as N(A) and N(T) respectively.

==== Normal (Academic) Course ====
In the Normal (Academic) course, students offer 5-8 subjects in the Singapore-Cambridge GCE Normal Level examination. Compulsory subjects include:

- English Language
- Mother Tongue Language
- Mathematics
- Combined Humanities

A fifth year leading to the Singapore-Cambridge GCE Ordinary Level examination is available to N(A) students who perform well in their Singapore-Cambridge GCE Normal Level examination. Students can move from one course to another based on their performance and the assessment of the school principal and teachers.

==== Normal (Technical) Course ====
The Normal (Technical) course prepares students for a technical-vocational education at the Institute of Technical Education. Students will offer 5-7 subjects in the Singapore-Cambridge GCE Normal Level examination. The curriculum is tailored towards strengthening students’ proficiency in English and Mathematics. Students take English Language, Mathematics, Basic Mother Tongue and Computer Applications as compulsory subjects.

== Notable alumni ==
- David Lim, former national water polo player who represented Singapore at the 1956 Summer Olympics
