= List of Singapore MRT and LRT rolling stock =

The rolling stock on Singapore's Mass Rapid Transit (MRT) and Light Rail Transit (LRT) includes several models of electric multiple units and people mover systems respectively. They are primarily operated by SBS Transit and SMRT Trains.

== Mass Rapid Transit (MRT) rolling stock ==
=== Current ===
Line		Generation	Stock	Manufacturer(s)	Assembly	Image	Trainset statistics									Speed	Power	Introduction	Cost
Line		Generation	Stock	Manufacturer(s)	Assembly	Image	Number of train sets	Cars per train set	Total number of cars	Car length	Train set length	Car width	Car height	Trainset capacity	Seats	Speed	Power	Introduction	Cost
North–South Line	East–West Line	4th	C151A	Kawasaki Heavy Industries & CSR/CRRC Qingdao Sifang	Qingdao, China		35	6	210	23.83m (DT); 22.8m (M)	138.86m	3.2m	3.7m	1,920 passengers	292	90 km/h (56 mph) (design) 80 km/h (50 mph) (service)	750 V DC third rail	27 May 2011; 15 years ago	S$368 million
North–South Line	East–West Line	5th	C151B	Kawasaki Heavy Industries & CSR/CRRC Qingdao Sifang	Qingdao, China		45	6	270	23.83m (DT); 22.8m (M)	138.86m	3.2m	3.7m	1,920 passengers	292	90 km/h (56 mph) (design) 80 km/h (50 mph) (service)	750 V DC third rail	16 April 2017; 9 years ago	S$281.5 million
North–South Line	East–West Line	6th	C151C	Kawasaki Heavy Industries & CSR/CRRC Qingdao Sifang	Qingdao, China		12	6	72	23.83m (DT); 22.8m (M)	138.86m	3.2m	3.7m	1,920 passengers	280	90 km/h (56 mph) (design) 80 km/h (50 mph) (service)	750 V DC third rail	30 September 2018; 8 years ago	$136.8 million
North–South Line	East–West Line	7th	R151	Alstom (formerly Bombardier) & CRRC Changchun	Changchun, China		106	6	636	23.83m (DT); 22.8m (M)	138.86m	3.2m	3.7m	1,920 passengers	228	90 km/h (56 mph) (design) 80 km/h (50 mph) (service)	750 V DC third rail	4 June 2023; 3 years ago	S$1.5 billion
North East Line		1st	C751A	Alstom	Valenciennes, France		25	6	150	23.65m (DT); 22.8m (Mp/Mi)	138.5m	3.2m	3.7m	1,920 passengers	296 (standard); 240 (high capacity)	100 km/h (62 mph) (design) 90 km/h (56 mph) (service)	1,500 V DC overhead catenary	20 June 2003; 23 years ago	$260 million
North East Line		2nd	C751C	Alstom & Shanghai Electric	Shanghai, China		18	6	108	23.65m (DT); 22.8m (Mp/Mi)	138.5m	3.2m	3.7m	1,920 passengers	296	100 km/h (62 mph) (design) 90 km/h (56 mph) (service)	1,500 V DC overhead catenary	1 October 2015; 11 years ago	S$234.9 million
North East Line		3rd	C851E	Alstom	Barcelona, Spain		6	6	36	23.65m (DT); 22.8m (Mp/Mi)	138.5m	3.2m	3.7m	1,920 passengers	296	100 km/h (62 mph) (design) 90 km/h (56 mph) (service)	1,500 V DC overhead catenary	28 July 2023; 3 years ago	S$249.9 million (Note: Contract covers combined cost of acquiring 36 C851E cars for the North East Line and 33 C851E cars for the Circle Line for a total of 69 cars.)
Circle Line		1st	C830	Alstom	Valenciennes, France		40	3	120	23.65m (Mc); 22.8m (T)	70.1m	3.2m	3.7m	931 passengers	146	90 km/h (56 mph) (design) 80 km/h (50 mph) (service)	750 V DC third rail	28 May 2009; 17 years ago	S$282 million
Circle Line		2nd	C830C	Alstom & Shanghai Electric	Shanghai, China		24	3	72	23.65m (Mc); 22.8m (T)	70.1m	3.2m	3.7m	931 passengers	146	90 km/h (56 mph) (design) 80 km/h (50 mph) (service)	750 V DC third rail	26 June 2015; 11 years ago	S$134 million
Circle Line		3rd	C851E	Alstom	Barcelona, Spain		23	3	69	23.65m (Mc); 22.8m (T)	70.1m	3.2m	3.7m	931 passengers	146	90 km/h (56 mph) (design) 80 km/h (50 mph) (service)	750 V DC third rail	13 April 2026; 6 months ago	S$249.9 million (Note: Contract covers combined cost of acquiring 36 C851E cars for the North East Line and 33 C851E cars for the Circle Line for a total of 69 cars.)
Downtown Line		1st	C951	Bombardier & CNR/CRRC Changchun	Changchun, China		92	3	276	23.65m (DM); 22.8m (T)	70.1m	3.2m	3.7m	931 passengers	130	90 km/h (56 mph) (design) 80 km/h (50 mph) (service)	750 V DC third rail	22 December 2013; 12 years ago	S$689.9 million
Thomson–East Coast Line		1st	T251	Kawasaki Heavy Industries & CRRC Qingdao Sifang	Qingdao, China		91	4	364	23.65m (DM); 22.8m (Mc/Tc)	92.9m	3.2m	3.7m	1,280 passengers	156	100 km/h (62 mph) (design) 90 km/h (56 mph) (service)	750 V DC third rail	31 January 2020; 6 years ago	S$749 million

=== Future ===
Line	Generation	Stock	Manufacturer(s)	Assembly	Image	Trainset statistics									Speed	Power	Introduction	Cost
Line	Generation	Stock	Manufacturer(s)	Assembly	Image	Number of train sets	Cars per train set	Total number of cars	Car length	Train set length	Car width	Car height	Trainset capacity	Seats	Speed	Power	Introduction	Cost
Jurong Region Line	1st	J151	Hyundai Rotem	Changwon, South Korea		62	3 (initial); 4 (final)	186 (initial)	18.6m (initial)	55.8m (initial)	2.75m	TBA	600 passengers (3-car config); 800 passengers (4-car config)	TBA	70 km/h (43 mph) (design)	750 V DC third rail	Mid-2028; 1 year's time	S$416.5 million
Cross Island Line	1st	CR151	CRRC Qingdao Sifang	Qingdao, China		44	6 (initial) 8 (final)	264 (initial)	TBA						90 km/h (56 mph) (service)	1,500 V DC overhead conductor rail	2030; 4 years' time	S$589 million

=== Retired ===
Line		Generation	Stock	Manufacturer(s)	Assembly	Image	Trainset statistics									Speed	Power	Service		Cost
Line		Generation	Stock	Manufacturer(s)	Assembly	Image	Number of train sets	Cars per train set	Total number of cars	Car length	Train set length	Car width	Car height	Trainset capacity	Seats	Speed	Power	Introduction	Retirement	Cost
North–South Line	East–West Line	1st	C151	Kawasaki Heavy Industries, Nippon Sharyo, Tokyu Car Corporation, & Kinki Sharyo	Kobe, Japan		66	6	396	23.65m (DT); 22.8m (M)	138m	3.2m	3.7m	1,920 passengers	372 (original); 296 (refurbished)	90 km/h (56 mph) (design) 80 km/h (50 mph) (service)	750 V DC third rail	7 November 1987; 38 years ago	26 September 2025; 13 months ago	S$581.5 million
North–South Line	East–West Line	2nd	C651	Siemens	Vienna, Austria		19	6	114	23.65m (DT); 22.8m (M)	138m	3.2m	3.7m	1,920 passengers	372 (unmodified)	90 km/h (56 mph) (design) 80 km/h (50 mph) (service)	750 V DC third rail	2 May 1995; 31 years ago	27 November 2024; 23 months ago	S$259 million
North–South Line	East–West Line	3rd	C751B	Kawasaki Heavy Industries & Nippon Sharyo	Kobe, Japan		21	6	126 (Note: Kawasaki Heavy Industries manufactured 66 cars and Nippon Sharyo manufactured 60 cars.)	23.83m (DT); 22.8m (M)	138.86m	3.2m	3.7m	1,920 passengers	272	90 km/h (56 mph) (design) 80 km/h (50 mph) (service)	750 V DC third rail	28 January 2000; 26 years ago	7 December 2024; 22 months ago	S$231 million

== Light Rail Transit (LRT) rolling stock ==
=== Current ===
Line	Generation	Stock	Supplier	Image	Trainset statistics		Speed	Power supply (third rail)	Service			Cost
Line	Generation	Stock	Supplier	Image	Cars per train set	Total number of cars	Speed	Power supply (third rail)	Introduction	Retirement	Decommissioned	Cost
Bukit Panjang LRT	2nd	C801A	Bombardier		1-2	13	55 km/h (34 mph) (design) 48 km/h (30 mph) (service)	600 V 3-phase AC at 50 Hz	19 November 2014; 11 years ago	—N/a	—N/a	TBD
Bukit Panjang LRT	3rd	C801B	Alstom & CRRC Nanjing Puzhen		1-2	19	55 km/h (34 mph) (design) 48 km/h (30 mph) (service)	600 V 3-phase AC at 50 Hz	1 August 2024; 2 years ago	—N/a	—N/a	TBD
Sengkang LRT / Punggol LRT	1st	C810	Mitsubishi		1-2	41	80 km/h (50 mph) (design) 70 km/h (43 mph) (service)	750 V DC	18 January 2003; 23 years ago	2025 – 2028	7 cars	TBD
Sengkang LRT / Punggol LRT	2nd	C810A	Mitsubishi		1-2	16	80 km/h (50 mph) (design) 70 km/h (43 mph) (service)	750 V DC	5 April 2016; 10 years ago	—N/a	—N/a	TBD
Sengkang LRT / Punggol LRT	3rd	C810D	Mitsubishi		2	66	80 km/h (50 mph) (design) 70 km/h (43 mph) (service)	750 V DC	15 July 2025; 15 months ago	—N/a	—N/a	S$526 million (Note: Cost of first 25 train sets)

=== Retired ===
Line	Generation	Stock	Supplier	Image	Trainset statistics		Speed	Power supply (third rail)	Service	
Line	Generation	Stock	Supplier	Image	Cars per train set	Total number of cars	Speed	Power supply (third rail)	Introduction	Retirement
Bukit Panjang LRT	1st	C801	Bombardier		1-2	19	55 km/h (34 mph) (design) 48 km/h (30 mph) (service)	600 V 3-phase AC at 50 Hz	6 November 1999; 26 years ago	17 October 2025; 12 months ago

== Work trains ==
SMRT Trains was known to use the following vehicles for maintenance of way as of 2015:

Stock	Purpose	Manufacturer	Number used (as of 2015)	Crew size	Weight	Speed
Track tamping vehicle	Tamp ballasts while simultaneously measuring and correcting track alignments	Plasser & Theurer	2	5 (minimum)	37/63 tons	Max. 19 km/h (self-propelled)
Multi-function Vehicle	Detect internal cracks within the rail in real time; check the geometry of the running rail and third rail.	Tamper, Plasser & Theurer	at least 2	4 (minimum)	32 tons	18 km/h (self-propelled), 40 km/h (max speed)
Rail grinding vehicle	Re-profile the rail heads and eliminate rail corrugation to reduce track stresses and extend the service life of the rail	Speno	2 (2 earlier units were retired and presumably sold off.)	4 (minimum)	118 tons	18 km/h (self-propelled), 50 km/h (hauled by locomotive)
Viaduct Inspection Wagon	Inspect elastomer bearing mounted between the concrete grinders and columns	Unknown	Unknown	4 (minimum) + 1 (External Professional Engineer)	36 tons	50 km/h (hauled by locomotive)
CKG diesel locomotive	Shunt passenger trains within Bishan Depot	CKG	2; previously 10	2	26 tons	18 km/h
Deli diesel locomotive	Provide propulsion for maintenance wagons and other machinery	Changzhou Kate Mining Machinery Engineering Co., Ltd.	19	2	56 tons	50 km/h
Schöma electric locomotive	Provide propulsion for maintenance wagons and other machinery	Schöma	4	2	34 tons	50 km/h
Tunnel cleaning wagon	Use high pressure water jets to clean tracks, third rail cover, mounting brackets alongside tracks and lower portion of tunnel walls	Unknown	Unknown	2	41 tons	50 km/h (hauled by locomotive)
Heavy crane vehicle	Lift heavy objects of up to 3-tons.	Unknown	Unknown	1 operator, 1 rigger, 1 lifting supervisor	60 tons	Limited to 18 km/h

In addition, SBS Transit has used a two-car MFV supplied by a joint venture between Plasser and Theurer and Speno and a railgrinder from Harsco and the Land Transport Authority is known to have procured multi-function vehicles and railgrinders from MERMEC of Italy and Harsco respectively for the Downtown Line and Thomson–East Coast Line, general maintenance vehicles for the Downtown Line from Gemac Engineering Machinery, as well as Bo-Bo battery-electric locomotives from CRRC Zhuzhou Locomotive. Engineering trains are also known to be interchangeable across different lines as shown with photos of a transfer of a multi-function vehicle between Bishan Depot and Kim Chuan Depot.

Contractors such as Gammon Construction are also known to have brought in their own work trains such as tampers for trackwork projects; SMRT used up to 14 road-rail vehicles provided by Gammon during the sleeper replacement from 2013 to 2016.
