= Alstom Metropolis C851E (Circle Line) =

Class of electric multiple units in Singapore

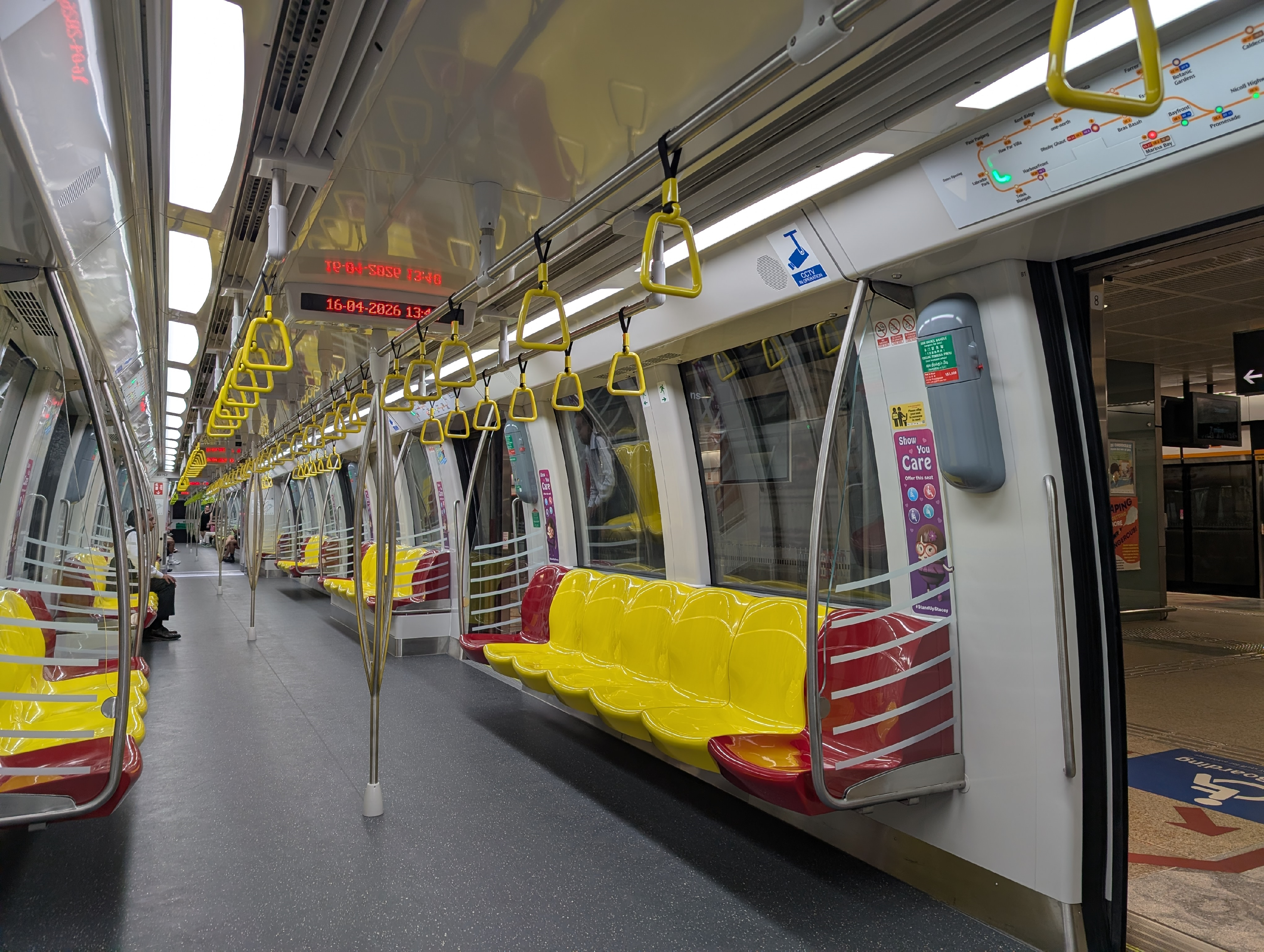
- Stock type: Electric multiple unit
- In service: 13 April 2026; 7 months ago – Present
- Manufacturer: Alstom
- Built at: Barcelona, Spain
- Family name: Metropolis
- Constructed: 2021 – 2025
- Entered service: 13 April 2026; 7 months ago
- Number built: 69 Vehicles (23 Sets)
- Number in service: 69 Vehicles (23 Sets)
- Formation: 3 cars per trainset (Mc1–T–Mc2)
- Fleet numbers: 865 – 887
- Capacity: 931 passengers (148 seats)
- Operator: SMRT Trains Ltd (SMRT Corporation)
- Depot: Kim Chuan
- Line served: Circle Line

Specifications
- Car body construction: Welded aluminium
- Train length: 70.1 m (229 ft 11 7/8 in)
- Car length: 23.65 m (77 ft 7 1/8 in) (Mc); 22.8 m (74 ft 9 5/8 in) (T)
- Width: 3.2 m (10 ft 6 in)
- Height: 3.7 m (12 ft 1 5/8 in)
- Doors: 1,450 mm (57 1/8 in), 8 per car, 4 per side
- Maximum speed: 90 km/h (56 mph) (design); 78 km/h (48 mph) (service)
- Traction system: Alstom OPTONIX IGBT–VVVF
- Acceleration: 0.95 m/s^{2} (3.1 ft/s^{2})
- Deceleration: 1.3 m/s^{2} (4.3 ft/s^{2}) (Emergency)
- Electric systems: 750 V DC third rail
- Current collection: Collector shoe
- UIC classification: Bo′Bo′+2′2′+Bo′Bo′
- Braking systems: Regenerative and pneumatic
- Safety systems: Alstom URBALIS 300 moving block CBTC ATC under ATO GoA 4 (UTO), with subsystems of ATP, Iconis ATS and Smartlock CBI
- Coupling system: Scharfenberg
- Track gauge: 1,435 mm (4 ft 8 1/2 in) standard gauge

The Alstom Metropolis C851E (Circle Line) is the third generation electric multiple unit rolling stock introduced on the Circle Line of Singapore's Mass Rapid Transit (MRT) system, manufactured by Alstom under Contract 851E. It consists of 23 three-car trains built alongside six six-car trains for the North East Line. The trains were manufactured and assembled in Alstom's manufacturing facility in Barcelona, Spain and progressively shipped to Singapore from 2022. The contract, valued at around S$250 million, was awarded by the Land Transport Authority (LTA) during a ceremony held at Sengkang Depot. Alstom was the sole bidder for this contract.

== Tender ==
The tender for trains under the contract C851E was closed on 2 October 2017 with Alstom being the sole bidder for this contract. The LTA shortlisted and published the tender results.

S/N	Name of tenderer	Amount (S$) Offer 1	Amount (S$) Offer 2	Remarks
1	Alstom Transport S.A. / Alstom Transport (S) Pte Ltd Consortium	279,782,872.00	293,489,289.00	Offer 1 in mixed currencies; S$410,100,934.00 (Alternative in mixed currencies)

Contract 851E was awarded to the sole bidder, Alstom, at a cost of S$250 million on 30 April 2018.

== Overview ==
The 23 trains supplement the existing C830 and C830C trains on the Circle Line, coinciding with the 4.3-kilometre (2.7 mi) long extension from HarbourFront to Marina Bay via Keppel, Cantonment and Prince Edward Road, which all three opened on 12 July 2026. The first train set arrived in Singapore on 11 March 2022. The first of these trains entered passenger service on 13 April 2026.

== Features ==
To enable a more robust maintenance regime, all the new trains are equipped with condition monitoring systems to gather data from equipment on the trains. This enables continuous monitoring of the health of the equipment and allows the operator to carry out predictive maintenance for the trains. Contact shoe sensors on the new Circle Line trains enable the operator to react promptly and take necessary measures if any dislodgement is detected.

They are fully automated (GoA4) and do not require an attendant on board.

On the Circle Line, the trains draw 750 V DC power from a bottom-contact third rail. Each 3-car train (Formation: Mc1–Tc–Mc2) comprises two Motor Cars (Mc1 and Mc2) at each end, and an unpowered Trailer Car (Tc) in the middle. The interior of the Circle Line C851E remains largely consistent with its predecessor, the C830C, save for a few subtle differences such as the colour scheme of the seats, enhanced cabin lighting, as well as the LED text displays being identical to the trains on the North East Line.

=== Automatic Track Inspection (ATI) ===
Two of the Circle Line C851E trains are each fitted with an Automatic Track Inspection (ATI) System, which enables monitoring of the running rails, track equipment, and sleepers while the trains are in operation. The ATI system uses a network of cameras, lasers, and sensors installed on train bogies to detect defects like rail cracks or missing fasteners. The CCL trains fitted with ATI are sets 867 and 868.

== Train formation ==
The coupling configuration of a CCL C851E in revenue service is Mc1–T–Mc2.

Cars of C851E (Circle Line)
Car type	Quantity	Driver cab	Motor	Collector shoe	Car length		Wheelchair bay
Car type	Quantity	Driver cab	Motor	Collector shoe	m	ft in	Wheelchair bay
Mc	2	✓			23.65	77 ft 7.1 in	✗
T	1	✗		✓	22.8	74 ft 9.6 in	✓

The car numbers of the trains range from 8065x to 8087x, where x depends on the carriage type. Individual cars are assigned a five-digit serial number by the rail operator SMRT Trains. A complete three-car trainset consists of one trailer (T) and two driving motor (Mc) cars permanently coupled together. For example, set 865 consists of carriages 80651, 80652, and 80653.

- The first digit identifies the line, which is always an 8.
- The second digit is always a 0.
- The third and fourth digits identify the set number.
- The fifth digit identifies the car number, where the first car has a 1, the second has a 2, and the third has a 3.
- Alstom built sets 865 – 887.

== See also ==
- Alstom Metropolis C851E (North East Line)
- Alstom Metropolis C830
- Alstom Metropolis C830C
