= Tai Seng Facility Building =

MRT depot in Singapore

- Interactive map of Tai Seng Facility Building

Location
- Location: 101 Bartley Road East, Singapore 533951
- Coordinates: 1°20′32.15″N 103°53′43.26″E

Characteristics
- Operator: SBS Transit DTL Pte Ltd (ComfortDelGro Corporation)
- Depot code: TSFB
- Roads: Bartley Road East
- Rolling stock: Bombardier Movia C951
- Routes served: DTL Downtown Line

History
- Opened: 21 October 2017; 8 years ago

Tai Seng Facility Building, abbreviated as TSFB or Tai Seng, is an underground train depot for the Mass Rapid Transit system in Singapore. The depot is constructed towards the east of Kim Chuan Depot and will provide maintenance, stabling and operational facilities for the Downtown Line. It is located in Hougang along Bartley Road East. It is accessible via a surface building located along Bartley Road East.

The depot is approximately 52 metres wide, 295 metres long and 20 metres deep. It is connected to Kim Chuan Depot and has underground access for trains to run between both facilities, allowing Downtown Line trains to be stabled in the Tai Seng Facility Building, and able to access its remote tracks. It is used in tandem with Kim Chuan Depot for the operations of the Downtown Line.

The depot is used at full capacity for the housing and maintenance of trains. This includes a direct connection between the line directly to the facility between Ubi station and Bedok North station via two reception tracks: 1 track Bukit Panjang-bound towards Ubi station and 1 track Expo-bound towards Bedok North station.
