= Circle Line (Singapore) =

Mass Rapid Transit line in Singapore

- An Alstom Metropolis C851E trainset at HarbourFront station, bound for Dhoby Ghaut in the clockwise direction.

Overview
- Native name: Malay: Laluan MRT Circle; Chinese: 地铁环线; Tamil: வட்ட ரயில் பாதை
- Status: Operational
- Owner: Land Transport Authority
- Locale: Singapore
- Termini: Dhoby Ghaut, Prince Edward Road (Note: Terminus for trains departing from Dhoby Ghaut during peak hours)
- Stations: 33
- Colour on map: Orange (#fa9e0d)

Service
- Type: Rapid transit Light metro
- System: Mass Rapid Transit (Singapore)
- Services: 3
- Operator: SMRT Trains (SMRT Corporation)
- Depot: Kim Chuan
- Rolling stock: Alstom Metropolis C830; Alstom Metropolis C830C; Alstom Metropolis C851E
- Daily ridership: 450,000 (2023)

History
- Opened: 28 May 2009; 17 years ago (Stage 3); 17 April 2010; 16 years ago (Stages 1 and 2); 8 October 2011; 15 years ago (Stages 4 and 5); 14 January 2012; 14 years ago (Circle Line Extension); 12 July 2026; 4 months ago (Stage 6)

Technical
- Line length: 39.5 km (24.5 mi)
- Track length: 39.5 km (24.5 mi)
- Character: Fully underground
- Track gauge: 1,435 mm (4 ft 8 1/2 in) standard gauge
- Electrification: 750 V DC third rail
- Operating speed: limit of 78 km/h (48 mph)
Maps
Interactive Map

The Circle Line (CCL) is a rail line on the Singapore Mass Rapid Transit (MRT) system. Operated by SMRT Trains, it runs in a loop mostly within the Central Region of the country, with a spur running from Dhoby Ghaut to Promenade. Coloured orange on the rail map, the fully underground line is 39.5 km (24.5 mi) long with 33 stations.

The CCL was initially conceived in the 1990s as the Marina Line, a light rail system linking the National Stadium, Shenton Way, and Marina South. An outer circle line, connecting Buona Vista and Paya Lebar via Bishan and Serangoon, was also proposed. In April 2001, it was announced that the section of the Marina Line between Dhoby Ghaut and Stadium would be built as the first stage of the CCL, comprising a loop extending to Marina South via World Trade Centre. Work began in 2002, but the Nicoll Highway collapse delayed the expected completion date of CCL Stage 1 from 2007 to 2009.

Stage 3, which spans between Bartley and Marymount, opened on 28 May 2009. The completion of Stages 1 and 2 on 17 April 2010 extended the CCL to Dhoby Ghaut. The line was extended to HarbourFront on 8 October 2011 with the opening of Stages 4 and 5. A two-station extension to Marina Bay was inaugurated on 14 January 2012. Stage 6, the final section connecting HarbourFront and Marina Bay via Keppel, Cantonment and Prince Edward Road, opened on 12 July 2026.

The CCL is Singapore's first medium-capacity rail line, and utilises three types of Alstom rolling stock – C830, C830C and C851E – all of which runs in a three-car formation. The line is fully automated and uses Alstom's Urbalis 300 Communications Based Train Control (CBTC) signalling system. Several artworks are displayed on all stations of the line as part of the Art in Transit programme.

== History ==
=== Planning ===
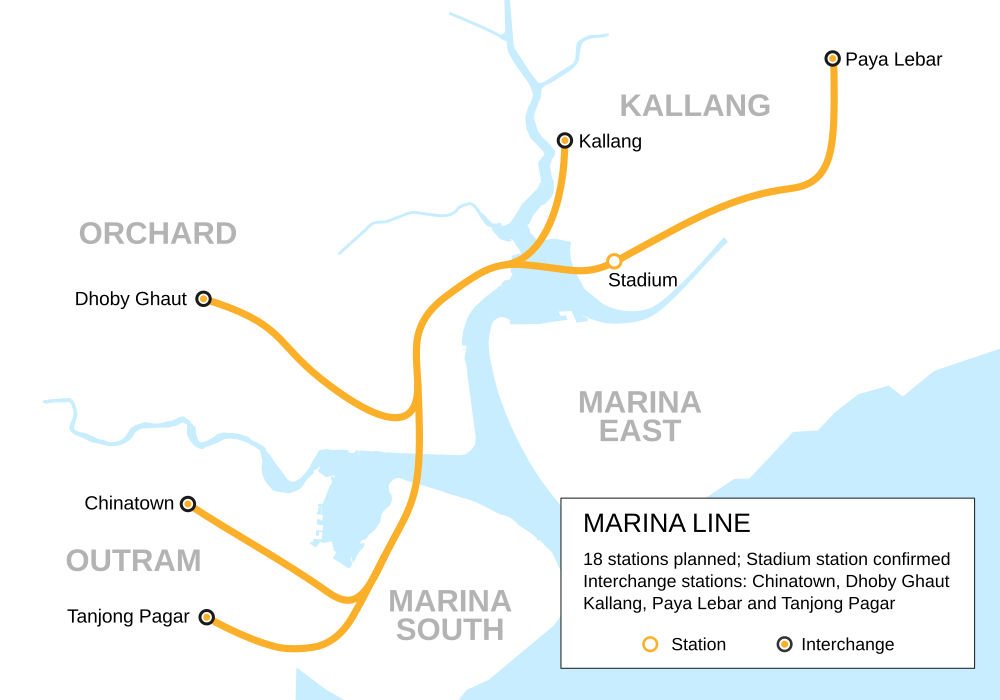
Map of the planned Marina Line

Plans for the Circle Line were first announced by Minister for Communications and Information Yeo Ning Hong, who said the line would connect Singapore's major housing estates. However, he added that such a route would only be built once Singapore's population reached four million and new housing estates were developed farther from the city centre. At the time, the MRT network followed a radial pattern, with lines extending outward from the city centre.

In October 1994, Communications Minister Mah Bow Tan announced a proposed overground light rail system designed to serve the National Stadium, Beach Road, Marina Centre, Shenton Way, and Marina South, with interchanges at Dhoby Ghaut and Kallang. In October 1997, the Land Transport Authority (LTA) invited companies to provide architectural and engineering services for a planned Marina Line (MRL). The proposed 12 km (7.5 mi) underground line would comprise 18 stations, running from Kallang station through Marina Centre and Marina South before interchanging with the North East Line at People's Park. A branch line from Marina Centre to Dhoby Ghaut was also proposed, while further branches and extensions to Paya Lebar and Tanjong Pagar were under consideration. In June 1998, Mah announced the government would proceed with the construction of the MRL, which was planned to have 20 stations and operate medium-capacity driverless trains. Construction was expected to begin in 2000 at an estimated cost of S$1.75 billion. The line was also designed with provisions to expand train capacity from four to six cars as passenger demand increased. Parsons Brinckerhoff and Mott MacDonald were appointed as architectural and engineering consultants for the MRL.

In October 1999, the LTA announced that an outer circle line would link Buona Vista and Paya Lebar via Bishan and Serangoon. The number of planned stations on the MRL also increased to 24. Construction of the segment between Dhoby Ghaut and Marina Centre would be prioritised given demand along the Bras Basah corridor, while construction of the other sections would be deferred due to lack of developments in the planned Marina Downtown. In November, the first six stations of the MRL from Dhoby Ghaut to Boulevard were announced, with plans to connect the MRL from Stadium station to the Outer Circle Line at Paya Lebar. The Outer Circle Line would also loop back to Marina South via World Trade Centre. Subsequently in April 2001, communications minister Yeo Cheow Tong announced that the Marina Line would be built as the first phase of the Circle Line (CCL), alongside the announcement of the second phase that would span 5 kilometres (3.1 mi) from Stadium to Upper Paya Lebar Road.

=== Construction ===
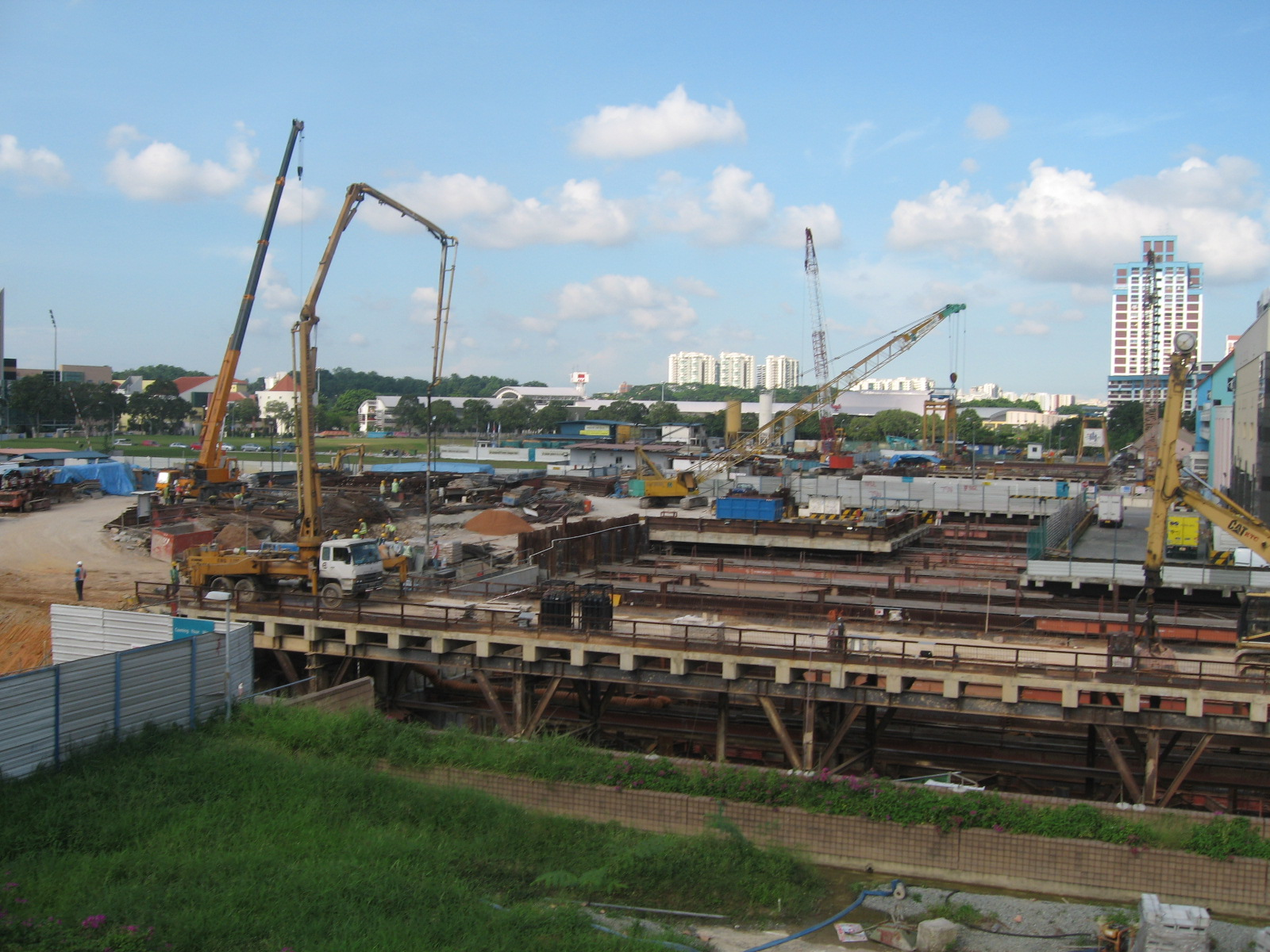
Construction site of Bishan station in May 2006

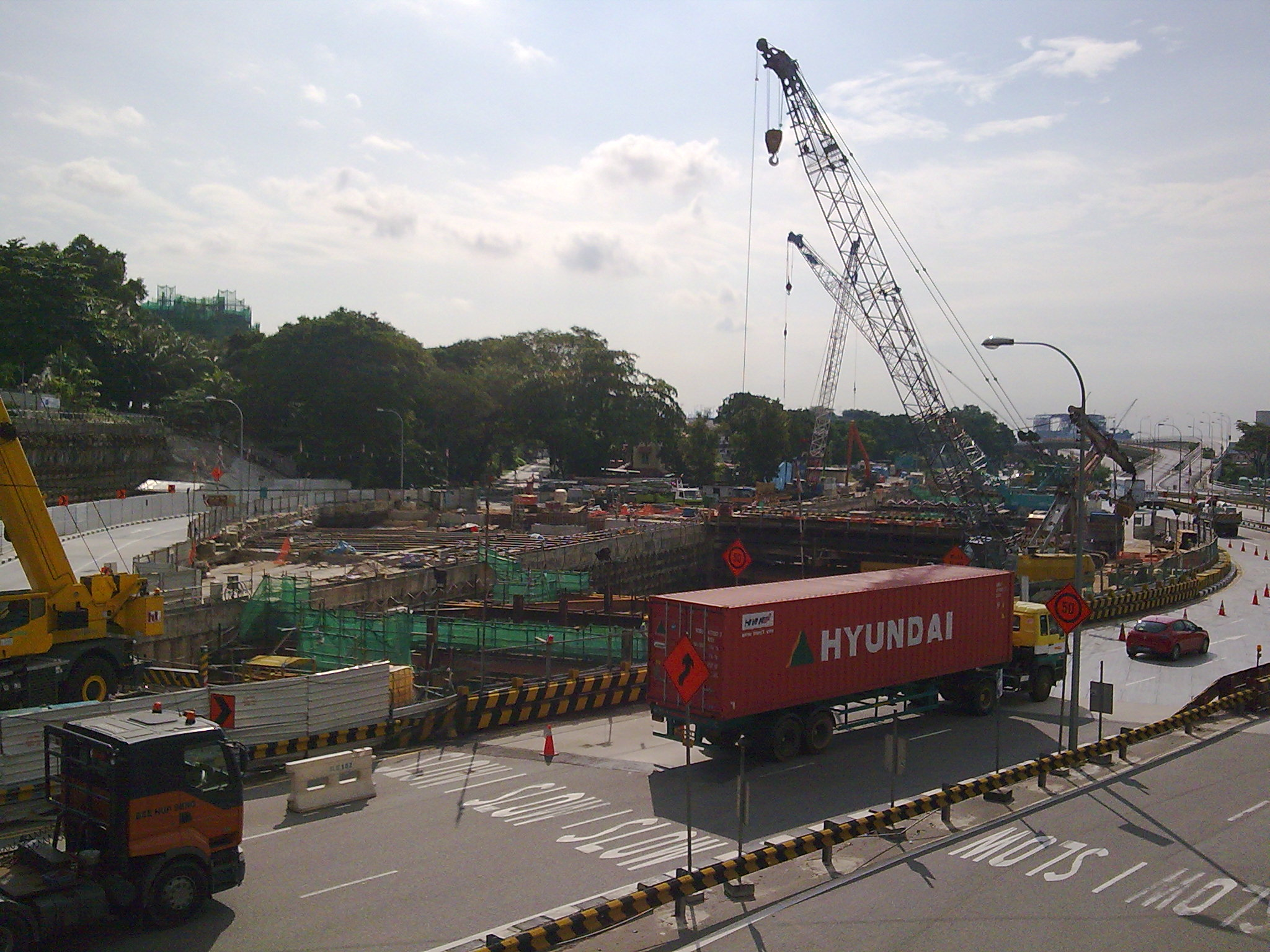
Haw Par Villa under construction in December 2008

Circle Line stations timeline
Date	Project	Description
28 May 2009	Stage 3 (CCL3)	Bartley – Marymount
17 April 2010	Stage 1 (CCL1)	Dhoby Ghaut – Stadium
17 April 2010	Stage 2 (CCL2)	Mountbatten – Tai Seng
8 October 2011	Stage 4 (CCL4)	Caldecott – Kent Ridge
8 October 2011	Stage 5 (CCL5)	Haw Par Villa – HarbourFront
14 January 2012	Circle Line Extension (CCLe)	Bayfront – Marina Bay
12 July 2026	Stage 6 (CCL6)	Keppel – Prince Edward Road

Industry observers anticipated that Trans-Island Bus Services would operate the CCL in accordance with the Singapore Government's initiative for multi-modal operators. TIBS had partnered with Régie autonome des transports parisiens for its bid to operate the line. However, the LTA ultimately awarded the contract to SMRT Corporation in August 2001. The LTA justified its decision based on SMRT's track record, financial strength, and customer service.

Construction of the CCL officially began on 5 March 2002 with a groundbreaking ceremony at Bras Basah Park. At the ceremony, Yeo announced that the 34-kilometre (21 mi) CCL would be built in five stages and completed by 2010. Stage 3 of the CCL (CCL3), which comprises five stations from Bartley to Marymount, was announced in January 2003. The 13 stations of CCL Stages 4 and 5 (CCL4 and CCL5) from Thomson to HarbourFront were announced in December 2003. This segment included three planned shell stations – Caldecott, Bukit Brown and Haw Par Villa. (Note: Caldecott was initially named Thomson, and Haw Par Villa was initially named West Coast. Both were renamed through a naming poll.) These station were to be opened only when their surroundings were more developed.

On 20 April 2004, the tunnels linking to Nicoll Highway station caved in along with a 100 m (330 ft) stretch of the Nicoll Highway. The collapse of a tunnel retaining wall caused soil subsidence, creating a hole 100 metres long, 130 metres wide, and 30 metres deep (328 by 427 by 98 ft). Four people were killed and three were injured. The LTA halted work at 16 of the 24 CCL excavation sites for review. A Committee of Inquiry (COI) concluded that the incident was caused by human error and organisational failures. The strut-waler support system was poorly designed and weaker than it should have been, with a lack of monitoring and proper management of data. Although the LTA initially said that the collapse happened without warning, the COI report revealed that there were already "warning signs", such as excessive wall deflections and surging inclinometer readings, which were not addressed seriously. The report pointed out a lack of safety culture at the site and made several recommendations to improve the safety of construction projects, which the government accepted. Nicoll Highway station was rebuilt 100 m (330 ft) south of the original site along Republic Avenue, with a new tunnel alignment between the Millenia and Boulevard stations. Due to the tunnels' collapse, the completion date of CCL Stage 1 was delayed from 2007 to 2009.

In March 2004, the LTA launched a public polling exercise to name the stations along the CCL, marking the first time the general public was invited to participate in the naming process to foster a greater sense of community ownership. The public could choose between two LTA-proposed names for each station or suggest their own, provided the names accurately reflected the area's locality, history, and multi-cultural heritage. The names for the CCL Stages 1 to 3 stations were finalised in July 2005. A subsequent naming poll for the CCL4 and CCL5 stations attracted 634 respondents – 152 more than the previous poll. These station names were finalised in December 2005.

On 14 June 2005, the LTA announced plans for the Downtown Extension (DTE), which was intended to be a branch of the CCL. Comprising five stations from Milennia (now Promenade) to Chinatown, it would serve the development of the Downtown at Marina Bay, a planned business and financial hub. Yam Ah Mee, the then-chief executive of the LTA, also stated that the agency was studying further extensions to the DTE, including an eastward extension to Kim Chuan Depot and a westward extension linking the line to the Bukit Timah Line In 2007, transport minister Raymond Lim announced that the DTE would instead be incorporated into the Downtown Line (DTL). Another branch to Marina Bay station via Bayfront was announced in April that year.

Construction of the CCL platforms at Dhoby Ghaut required stabilising the existing underpass above linking the North East Line (NEL) and North–South Line platforms. Seven caisson piles were installed to enhance the support of the underpass and capping beams were then constructed to form the supporting system. At Esplanade, the arterial routes of Bras Basah Road and Nicoll Highway had to be diverted through more than 10 phases. The station was constructed using the top-down method to minimise the impact of noise and dust pollution on the surrounding developments. Diaphragm walls were built to minimise ground movement. With the roof constructed first, construction could proceed under all weather conditions while allowing the early reinstatement of Bras Basah Road and War Memorial Park. Two East–West Line viaduct piers at Paya Lebar station had to be underpinned. Using concrete walls, beams, and a powerful jacking system, they transferred the weight of the viaduct so they could safely cut away the old piles.

During excavation of the CCL tunnels beneath Serangoon station, contractors encountered significant groundwater seepage, causing ground settlement and the NEL station to sink by 1 centimetre (0.39 in). Works were suspended while water was pumped out, and NEL trains were required to slow when entering or leaving the station. The tunnel was subsequently redesigned, with jet grouting and enhanced monitoring introduced to detect further settlement. At Holland Village, the excavation pit was only 6 m (20 ft) away from the Willyn Ville Condominium, requiring vigilant ground testing and wall deflection monitoring to ensure the building's safety. Similarly, Pasir Panjang was dug in soft ground just 10 metres (33 ft) from a road viaduct and in close proximity to residential homes and shophouses.

Following the ground settlement of two road lanes near the junction of Telok Blangah Road and Alexandra Road in August 2007, the Building and Construction Authority halted tunnelling works near Telok Blangah. A section of Cornwall Gardens Road near Holland Road caved in on 24 May 2008 during tunnelling works between Holland and Farrer Road stations. While no one was injured, the sinkhole led to the disruptions of utilities in the area.

=== Opening ===
The Straits Times reported that the CCL3 stations were "in advanced stages of completion" in September 2007, with architectural, engineering, and mechanical works being carried out and expected to be finished by mid-2008. In January 2008, the CCL3 stations' completion date was moved earlier from 2010 to mid-2009. Two of the planned shell stations – Thomson and West Coast – would also be fitted out and opened with the other CCL stations. The LTA started conducting test runs on the CCL3 stations, with the expected commencement date set for June 2009. In February 2009, transport minister Raymond Lim announced that CCL3 would open on 30 May, though it was later moved to 28 May. An open house was held for the CCL3 stations on 23 May, before operations commenced on 28 May. An opening ceremony was held at Bishan station, presided by deputy prime minister Teo Chee Hean.

Due to the Nicoll Highway collapse, the expected opening date for CCL1 was delayed by two years from 2007 to 2009. In August 2009, transport minister Lim announced that CCL1 and 2 would open by the first half of 2010; this was later announced to be 17 April. An open house was held on 5 April 2010. CCL1 and CCL2 commenced operations on 17 April 2010, with transport minister Lim holding an opening ceremony at Bras Basah station the day before.

Tunnelling works for the CCL were completed in August 2009, marked by a tunnel breakthrough ceremony at Farrer Road. As announced by transport minister Lui Tuck Yew during his visit to the CCL 4 and CCL 5 stations on 1 August 2011, the segment began revenue service on 8 October of that year. The Circle Line extension (CCLe) to Marina Bay opened on 14 January 2012, with an official opening ceremony held on the day before.

=== Tunnel strengthening works ===
In 2023, routine inspections by the LTA and train operators found that a stretch of the CCL tunnel between Promenade and Nicoll Highway stations was subjected to greater pressure. Although no safety risks were identified, precautionary strengthening works, including the installation of steel supports, were carried out between June and July to ensure the tunnel's long-term integrity. To facilitate these strengthening works, only one platform remained in operation from 9 pm daily for the segment between Stadium and Dhoby Ghaut, and on the CCLe between Bayfront and Marina Bay.

The LTA announced in December 2025 that the tunnels between Mountbatten and Paya Lebar would be closed from January to April 2026 to facilitate tunnel strengthening works. Following scans conducted after earlier works in 2023, the LTA identified three localised sections of the CCL tunnels that were more affected by tunnel squatting – the deformation of tunnel linings due to compression of marine clay. Shuttle trains ran on a single platform at 10-minute intervals connecting the Mountbatten, Dakota and Paya Lebar stations, while peak-hour frequencies between HarbourFront and Paya Lebar were raised from two to three minutes. Shuttle buses were also deployed to supplement the disrupted services.

The strengthening works involved installing an estimated 300 steel rings made from plates fabricated in China. Each plate, weighing about 800 kilograms (1,800 lb), was positioned using a robotic arm and temporarily secured with mechanical bolts before being permanently fixed with epoxy-based chemical bolts, welding, and grouting. Installation of the steel rings in the HarbourFront-bound tunnel was completed in February 2026. The strengthening works were completed ahead of schedule, and regular CCL services resumed on 11 April.

=== Circle Line Stage 6 ===
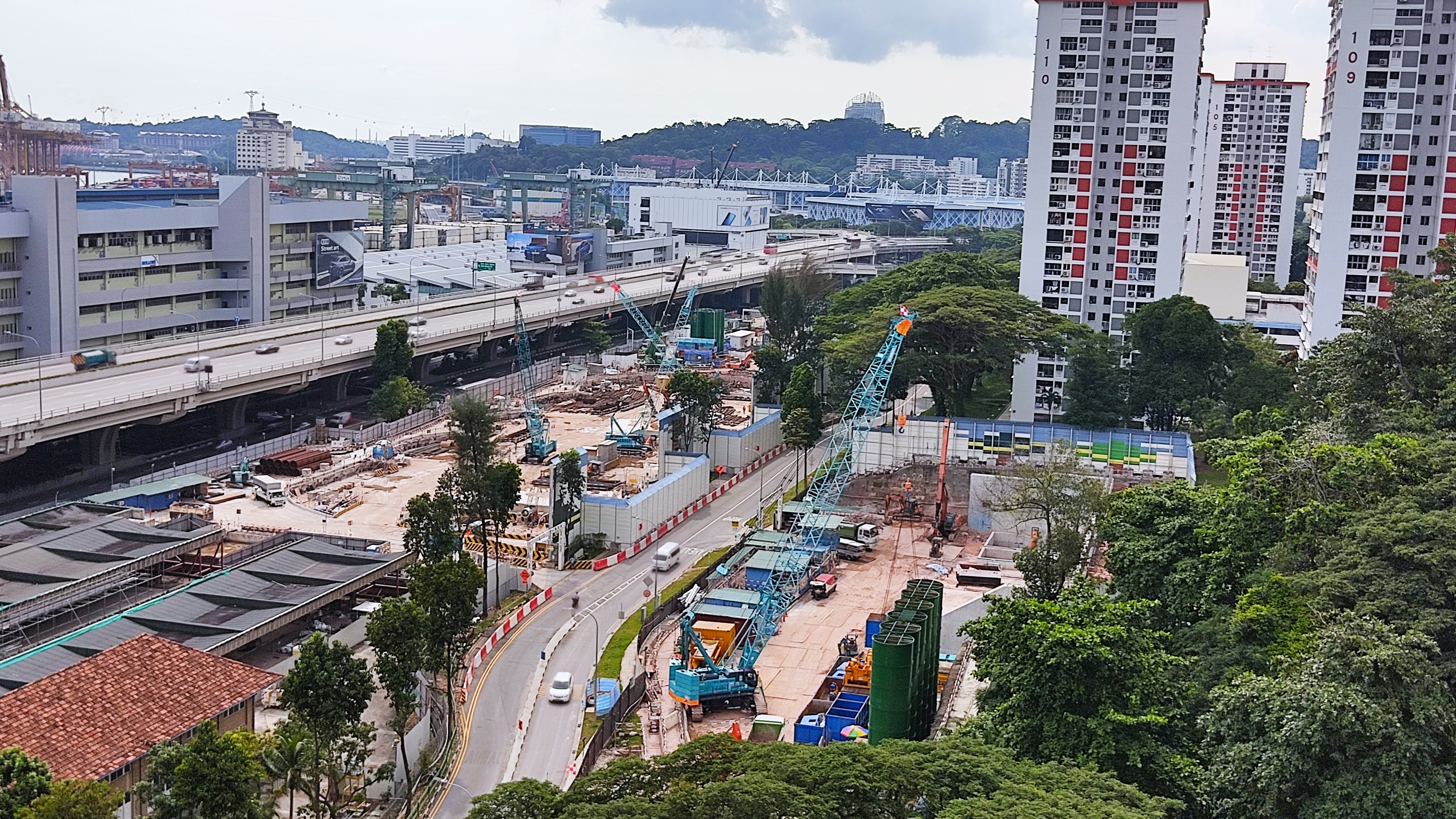
Construction site of Cantonment in 2020

Stage 6 of the CCL (CCL6), which LTA said would "close the circle" by linking HarbourFront to Marina Bay, was first announced by transport minister Lui in January 2013 as part of the 2013 Land Transport Master Plan. Although CCL6 had been envisaged in the original plans for the line, construction did not proceed until the required land became available. This included the former Tanjong Pagar Railway Station and its railway tracks, which were returned to Singapore in 2011, as well as the port terminals, which were being relocated to Tuas. Details of the CCL6 were finalised in October 2015. The 4 km (2.5 mi) segment would include three stations – Keppel, Cantonment and Prince Edward, and was expected to be completed by 2025. The project also includes the expansion of Kim Chuan Depot. Prince Edward station was renamed to Prince Edward Road following a naming poll held in 2017.

To facilitate construction works of Cantonment station, the old train platform canopy structures were relocated to a restoration yard nearby in November 2017. Tunnelling works for the CCL6 began on 25 July 2019 with the launch of the Tunnel Boring Machine (TBM) at Keppel station. The TBM would tunnel from Keppel to HarbourFront station. To construct the tunnels between Keppel and Cantonment, the Keppel viaduct was underpinned with new micro piles. Three bored piles were removed for the tunnelling works. During tunnelling between the Cantonment and Prince Edward Road stations, structures were erected to protect the Tanjong Pagar railway station's facade and interior, and monitoring instruments were installed to watch out for any building settlement. CCL6 tunnelling works were completed on 12 January 2022, with a final tunnel breakthrough from Prince Edward Road into Cantonment.

From January to April 2024, one platform at the Telok Blangah and HarbourFront stations were closed to facilitate track integration works with the CCL6 stations. A new Integrated Supervisory Control System (ISCS) – which monitors and manages power supply, communications and station facilities on the CCL – has also been installed in 2025. Final system integration testing works occurred in April and May 2026.

Due to delays caused by the COVID-19 pandemic, the completion date of CCL6 was shifted to 2025, then to the first half of 2026. In April 2026, the opening was delayed a final time to the middle of the year. In May, transport minister Jeffrey Siow announced that the CCL6 stations would open on 12 July 2026. A preview of the stations was held on 4 July. The Straits Times reported smooth operations on the first weekday following the opening of CCL6, with passengers noting that the completed loop provided faster and more convenient journeys, reduced crowding and fewer transfers.

== Network and operations ==
=== Services ===
The CCL is a medium-capacity line operated by SMRT Trains. Since October 2016, the CCL has been part of the New Rail Financing Framework (NRFF). Previously, the operator, which owned the rail assets, had to bear the cost of maintaining and upgrading trains and signalling. Under the NRFF, the LTA will take control of its operating assets and SMRT will operate the line under a 15-year licence which will expire on 30 September 2031. The LTA and SMRT will share the profits and financial risks in operating the line.

Trains on the Circle Line run every 2 to 6 minutes, with peak hour services running every 2 minutes. (Note: Except for Dhoby Ghaut, Bras Basah, Esplanade, Bayfront and Marina Bay, where peak-hour trains run every four minutes.) Similar to the NEL, the CCL initially had a higher fare than the North–South and East–West lines due to greater operating costs. On 30 December 2016, fares on the CCL were lowered to match the other lines with a "purely distance-based approach". This revision, made after a fare review by the Public Transport Council, was intended to minimise commuter confusion.

Following the opening of CCL6, the CCL operates four main services: the Anticlockwise Loop and Clockwise Loop for continuous travel, and Anticlockwise and Clockwise services that would serve the spur on the Dhoby Ghaut branch and terminate at Prince Edward Road station. As continuous loop operation was new to Singapore, the LTA conducted a wayfinding survey in March 2025, which found that respondents preferred the terms "clockwise" and "anticlockwise" over alternatives such as "inner loop" and "outer loop". In July 2026, the LTA dropped "loop" from its service terminology and used "clockwise" and "anticlockwise" regardless whether the trains run across the entire loop. Information on terminating stations or subsequent interchanges on the digital display were enlarged.

Transport minister Lui Tuck Yew projected that the CCL would serve 400,000 passengers daily upon the completion of CCL Stages 4 and 5 in 2011. Prior to their opening, the CCL recorded average daily ridership of 230,000 on weekdays and 150,000 on weekends. Following the opening of the 12 new stations, commuters interviewed by The Straits Times reported that the line had already become more crowded, with Bishan station also experiencing heavy congestion. Daily ridership on the CCL reached 300,000 in November 2011, more than double of SMRT's projections, and rose to 398,000 in May 2015. As of 2025, the CCL records an average daily ridership of 463,000.

The CCL was the least reliable line on the network in terms of mean kilometres between failures (MKBF) from 2023 to 2025 in LTA's monthly report, only achieving 1.069 million train-km in 2025. Reliability of the CCL improved in July 2025, and has reached 2.36 million train-km in April 2026 and 2.37 million train-km in May 2026. In July 2024, SMRT chief executive Ngien Hoon Ping attributed the CCL breakdowns to upgrading works integrating the line's existing systems with CCL6, and pledged that the line's reliability "will go straight up" upon the completion of CCL6. In October 2026, the CCL's MKBF is 1.97 million train-km.

=== Route ===
Geographically accurate map of the Circle Line

The 39.5-kilometre (24.5-mile) (Note: The original CCL was 33.3 km (20.7 mi). The CCL extension from Promenade to Marina Bay is 2.4 km (1.5 mi). The CCL6 segment from Keppel to Prince Edward Road spans 4 km (2.5 mi).) CCL forms a complete loop that passes through the eastern, northern and western areas of Singapore, with a spur line branching off Promenade that ends at Dhoby Ghaut in the Central Region. The line is coloured orange on official maps.

The CCL spur line begins at Dhoby Ghaut station, where it interchanges with the NSL and NEL. From there, the spur line runs eastwards to Esplanade, paralleling Bras Basah Road. The spur line turns north and joins the main line at Promenade station, where it interchanges with the DTL. After turning east toward Nicoll Highway, the CCL passes underneath the Kallang Basin. Between the Stadium and Dakota stations, the line parallels Stadium Boulevard and Old Airport Road.

The line continues northwards and parallels Paya Lebar Road and Upper Paya Lebar Road between the Paya Lebar and Tai Seng stations. Reception tracks between Tai Seng and Bartley connect the CCL to Kim Chuan Depot. Briefly paralleling Bartley Road at Bartley, the line runs in a general westward direction, interchanging with the NEL at Serangoon and the NSL at Bishan.

Turning south to Marymount, the CCL interchanges with the Thomson–East Coast Line (TEL) at Caldecott, before continuing in a general southwest direction between Caldecott and Kent Ridge. The line also interchanges with the DTL at Botanic Gardens and the EWL at Buona Vista. After Kent Ridge station, the line curves southeastwards, paralleling West Coast Highway, Pasir Panjang Road and Telok Blangah Road towards HarbourFront.

From HarbourFront, the line continues eastwards, paralleling Keppel Road and Ayer Rajah Expressway, until Marina Bay and turns northwards to Promenade station, generally paralleling Bayfront Avenue and closing the loop. At Bayfront station, the line passes underneath Marina Bay Sands and has a cross-platform interchange with the DTL.

=== Stations ===
The line has 33 operational stations. Twelve stations connect to other MRT lines. A reserved station, Bukit Brown, will be built in tandem with future developments.

Station code	Station name	Images	Interchange; Adjacent transportation	Opening
CC1 NS24 NE6	Dhoby Ghaut		North–South Line; North East Line	17 April 2010; 16 years ago
CC2	Bras Basah		—	17 April 2010; 16 years ago
CC3	Esplanade		—	17 April 2010; 16 years ago
CC4 DT15	Promenade		Downtown Line	17 April 2010; 16 years ago
CC5	Nicoll Highway		—	17 April 2010; 16 years ago
CC6	Stadium		—	17 April 2010; 16 years ago
CC7	Mountbatten		—	17 April 2010; 16 years ago
CC8	Dakota		—	17 April 2010; 16 years ago
CC9 EW8	Paya Lebar		East–West Line	17 April 2010; 16 years ago
CC10 DT26	MacPherson		Downtown Line	17 April 2010; 16 years ago
CC11	Tai Seng		—	17 April 2010; 16 years ago
CC12	Bartley		—	28 May 2009; 17 years ago
CC13 NE12	Serangoon		North East Line ― Serangoon	28 May 2009; 17 years ago
CC14	Lorong Chuan		—	28 May 2009; 17 years ago
CC15 NS17	Bishan		North–South Line ― Bishan	28 May 2009; 17 years ago
CC16	Marymount		—	28 May 2009; 17 years ago
CC17 TE9	Caldecott		Thomson–East Coast Line	8 October 2011; 15 years ago
CC18	Bukit Brown		—	TBA
CC19 DT9	Botanic Gardens		Downtown Line	8 October 2011; 15 years ago
CC20	Farrer Road		—	8 October 2011; 15 years ago
CC21	Holland Village		—	8 October 2011; 15 years ago
CC22 EW21	Buona Vista		East–West Line ― Buona Vista; Ghim Moh	8 October 2011; 15 years ago
CC23	one-north		—	8 October 2011; 15 years ago
CC24	Kent Ridge		Jurong Region Line (East) (early-2040s)	8 October 2011; 15 years ago
CC25	Haw Par Villa		—	8 October 2011; 15 years ago
CC26	Pasir Panjang		—	8 October 2011; 15 years ago
CC27	Labrador Park		—	8 October 2011; 15 years ago
CC28	Telok Blangah		—	8 October 2011; 15 years ago
CC29 NE1	HarbourFront		North East Line ― HarbourFront	8 October 2011; 15 years ago
CC30	Keppel		—	12 July 2026; 4 months ago
CC31	Cantonment		—	12 July 2026; 4 months ago
CC32	Prince Edward Road		Shenton Way	12 July 2026; 4 months ago
CC33 NS27 TE20	Marina Bay		North–South Line; Thomson–East Coast Line	14 January 2012; 14 years ago
CC34 DT16	Bayfront		Downtown Line	14 January 2012; 14 years ago
↓ Loop continues to CC4 DT15 Promenade ↓

== Infrastructure ==
=== Rolling stock ===
An Alstom Metropolis C830 trainset at Kim Chuan Depot

The CCL's rolling stock consists of three-car driverless trains that can accommodate up to 931 passengers per trainset. As part of Contract C830, Alstom supplied 40 Alstom Metropolis trains for the CCL. An additional 24 second-generation Alstom Metropolis C830C trains were delivered to Singapore beginning in June 2014. An additional 11 third-generation Alstom Metropolis C851E trains were ordered in April 2018, and 12 more trainsets were ordered in July 2019. Built in Barcelona, the first C851E trainset arrived in Singapore in March 2022 and officially entered passenger service on 13 April 2026. In May 2026, transport minister Jeffrey Siow said the LTA is studying plans for the refurbishment of the C830 trains.

The CCL trains are controlled by an operations control centre (OCC) at Kim Chuan Depot. Powered by 750V DC third rail, the trains have a top speed of 90 km/h (56 mph) but with a maximum operational speed of 80 km/h (50 mph). (Note: A source states the maximum service speed is 78 km/h (48 mph).) Each train is 70 metres (230 ft) in long, 3.21 metres (10.5 ft) wide and 3.68 m (12.1 ft) in high, with a weight of 122.49 t (120.56 long tons; 135.02 short tons). The trains are fitted with 146 seats and two wheelchair spaces. There are four 1.4 metres (4 ft 7 in) wide doors on each side of the carriage. Large windows at the front and rear of the trains provide passengers with clear views of the tunnels. In emergencies, detrainment doors at both ends of the trains can be opened to deploy evacuation ramps. The trains also have smoke and heat detectors with an emergency ventilation system and a fully redundant train management system.

The C830C trains feature additional straphangers and platform gap fillers to reduce the space between the train and platform edge. Dynamic Route Map Displays positioned above each door show the train's current location, route information, and the side on which the doors will open at the next station. The C851E trains are equipped with sensors on the current collector shoes to detect any dislodgement while drawing power from the third rail. Two trainsets are also fitted with an Automatic Track Inspection (ATI) system, allowing real-time monitoring of running rails, track equipment and sleepers during operation.

=== Depot ===
Entrance to Kim Chuan Depot

Kim Chuan Depot, located at Hougang Avenue 3 and Kim Chuan Road, houses the line's fleet. The depot was constructed by a joint venture between Hock Lian Seng Infrastructure Pte Ltd and Hock Chuan Ann Construction Pte Ltd for S$296.55 million (US$221.3 million). Spanning 11 ha (27 acres), the underground depot could accommodate up to 77 three-car trains. It also houses the line's Operations Control Centre (OCC), which oversees the statuses of trains and other equipment on the CCL, as well as the Depot Control Centre, which runs trains within the depot. The depot also features an Automatic Storage and Retrieval System, Singapore's tallest underground automated warehouse at 23 m (75 ft) high. Serving as the central warehouse for the CCL, it can store up to 24,000 train spare parts. The train washing facilities at Kim Chuan are also fully automated.

Before the completion of Gali Batu Depot, a temporary OCC for the DTL was established at the depot, where the DTL trains were also temporarily stabled. After the relocation of the NSL and EWL OCC to Kim Chuan Depot in 2019. the OCC for the three lines were consolidated into the Rail Operations Centre. A new Maintenance Engineering Centre, which monitors and controls the maintenance activities of the NSL, EWL and CCL, was established at Kim Chuan in April 2023. In June 2024, the SMRT Rail Safety Experiential Centre (SRSEC) was commissioned at Kim Chuan. The SRSEC showcases visuals and artefacts from past incidents as reminders of the need for vigilance and continuous improvement for SMRT staff.

The depot is being expanded by 16 ha (40 acres), doubling its underground capacity to support a larger fleet of 133 trains. The expansion project, expected to be completed with the CCL6 stations, would include a bus depot above the facility. The contract for the depot's expansion was awarded to Woh Hup for S$1.21 billion (US$0.9 billion).

=== Signalling ===
The CCL is equipped with Alstom's fully automatic Urbalis 300 Communications Based Train Control (CBTC) signalling system, which is similar to the signalling system on the NEL. Its subsystems include the MASTRIA on-board computer, which uses redundant moving-block technology; SMARTLOCK interlocking; the ICONIS data management system; and IAGO waveguide. (Note: IAGO stands for Informatisation et Automatisation par Guide d'Onde.) The system also features an Alstom's Automatic Train System (ATS) which manages train timetables, headways and station dwell times. It was Alstom's first ATS deployment for a driverless metro system. The signalling contract was awarded to a joint consortium between Alstom and Singapore Technologies Electronics for €739 million.

Train-to-trackside communication is provided by a continuous, bidirectional and redundant Radio Waveguide Information Network, which provides sufficient bandwidth for fail-safe automatic train control (ATC), maintenance dispatching, passenger information and video transmission. The network uses military-grade direct sequence spread spectrum technology to minimise interference. The ATC system consists of trackside and trainborne components. The trackside ATC locates trains, establishes protective zones and securely transmits movement authorisations. On board the trains, the ATC comprises an automatic train Operation (ATO) component and a safety-critical automatic train protection (ATP) component. The ATP continuously monitors the train's safety conditions, validates movement authorisations and ensures that trains brake safely before restrictive signals, other trains and other hazards. The Urbalis system also supports automatic repositioning: if a train stops misaligned with a platform following a failure such as a temporary loss of traction or braking, the ATO can make precise movements of between 6 cm (2.4 in) and 10 cm (3.9 in) to realign the train with the platform screen doors.

As the CCL was opened in stages, engineers had to manage transitions between interim and final signalling configurations. To avoid manual card and connection changes during short engineering periods, a physical keyswitch was incorporated into the computer-based interlocking (CBI) system to switch between configurations. During the integration of CCL1 and CCL2 with CCL3, the ATS was progressively migrated from the test server to the operational server, while the ATC was switched to its final operational configuration. This enabled live integration testing while allowing engineers to revert to earlier software versions if anomalies were detected. After integration, the merged network underwent carousel loop tests to identify and resolve faults and technical issues before CCL1 and CCL2 opened. This process was repeated with CCL4 and 5, and with the CCLe.

=== Station facilities ===
All CCL stations are wheelchair accessible. A tactile system, consisting of tiles with rounded or elongated raised studs, guides visually impaired commuters through the station, with dedicated tactile routes that connect the station entrances to the platforms. Wider fare gates allow easier access for wheelchair users into the station. Platform screen doors (PSDs) along the line were installed by Singapore Technologies Electronics Ltd and supplied by Westinghouse. (Note: The PSDs of the CCL6 stations are also supplied by ST Engineering Electronics.)

Twelve stations on the CCL are designated as Civil Defence (CD) shelters, which will be activated in times of national emergencies. (Note: The CD stations are: Cantonment, Labrador Park, Haw Par Villa, Buona Vista, Botanic Gardens, Caldecott, Bishan, Lorong Chuan, Bartley, MacPherson, Dakota and Mountbatten.) Apart from reinforced construction, the stations are designed and equipped with facilities to ensure the shelter environment is tolerable for all during shelter occupation. These facilities include protective blast doors, decontamination facilities, ventilation systems, power, water supply systems and a dry toilet system.

== Culture ==
=== Architecture ===
A variety of architecture on the CCL stations

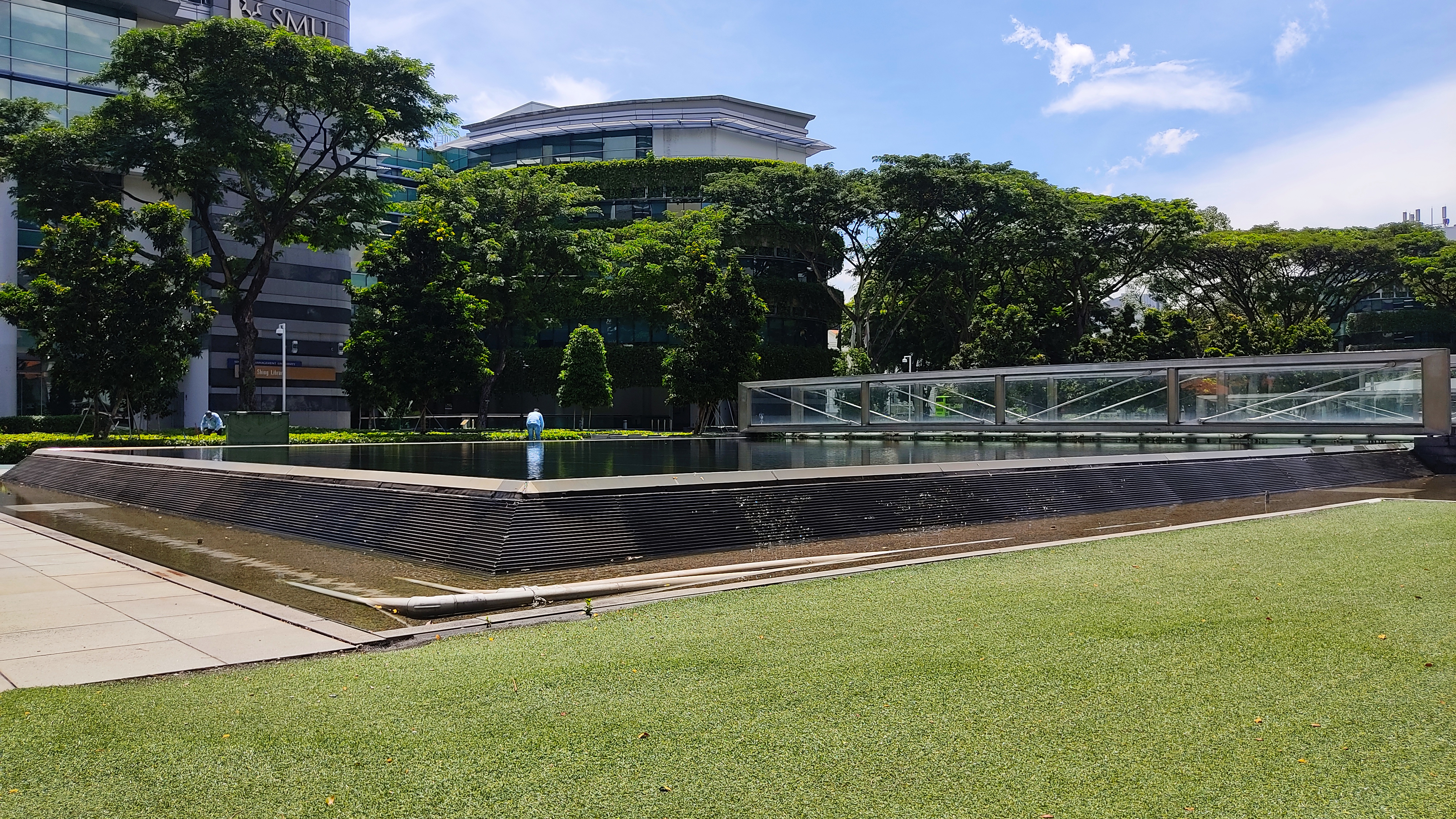
The reflecting pool above Bras Basah station, which is 35 m (115 ft) deep

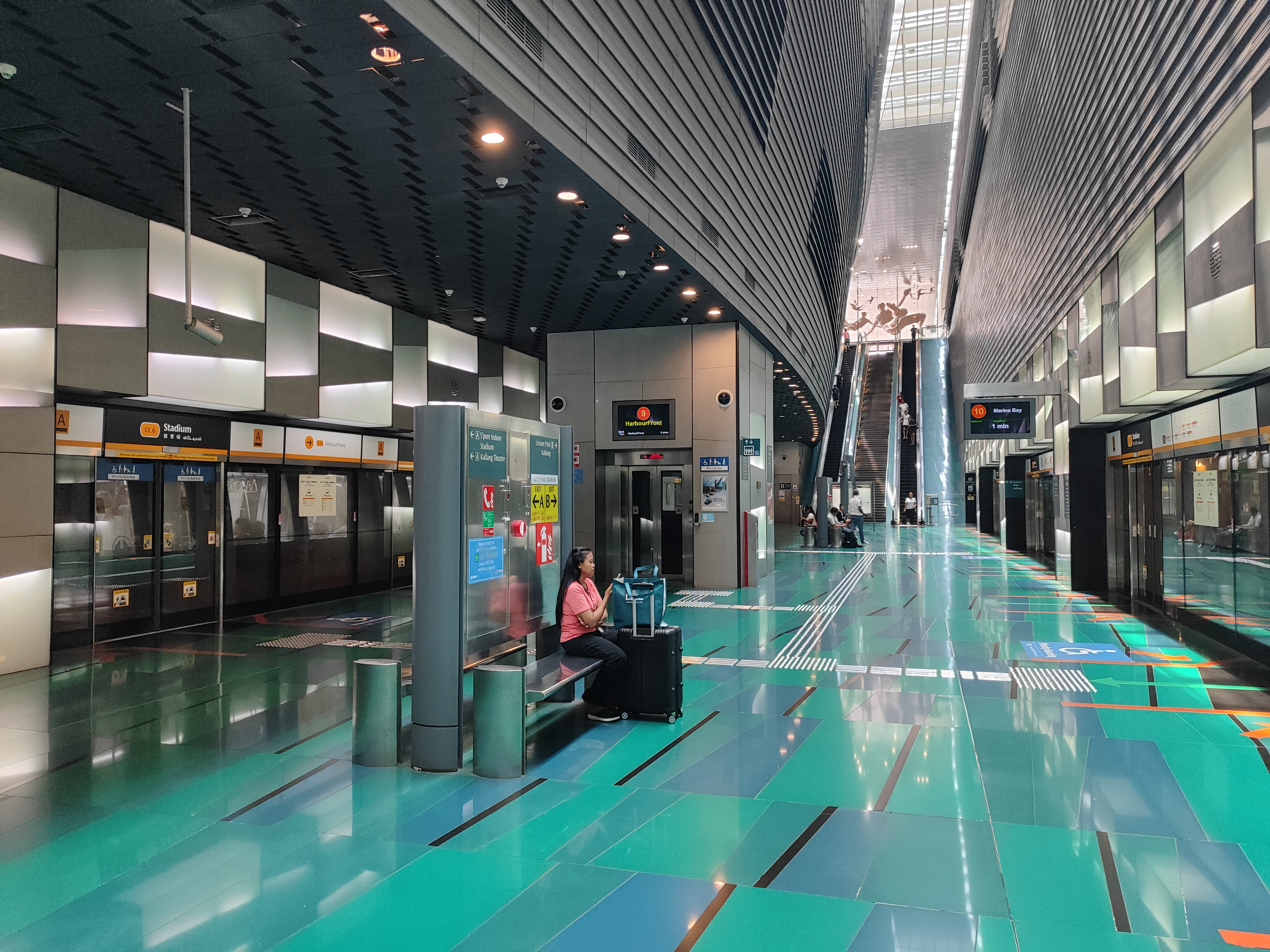
Interior of Stadium station

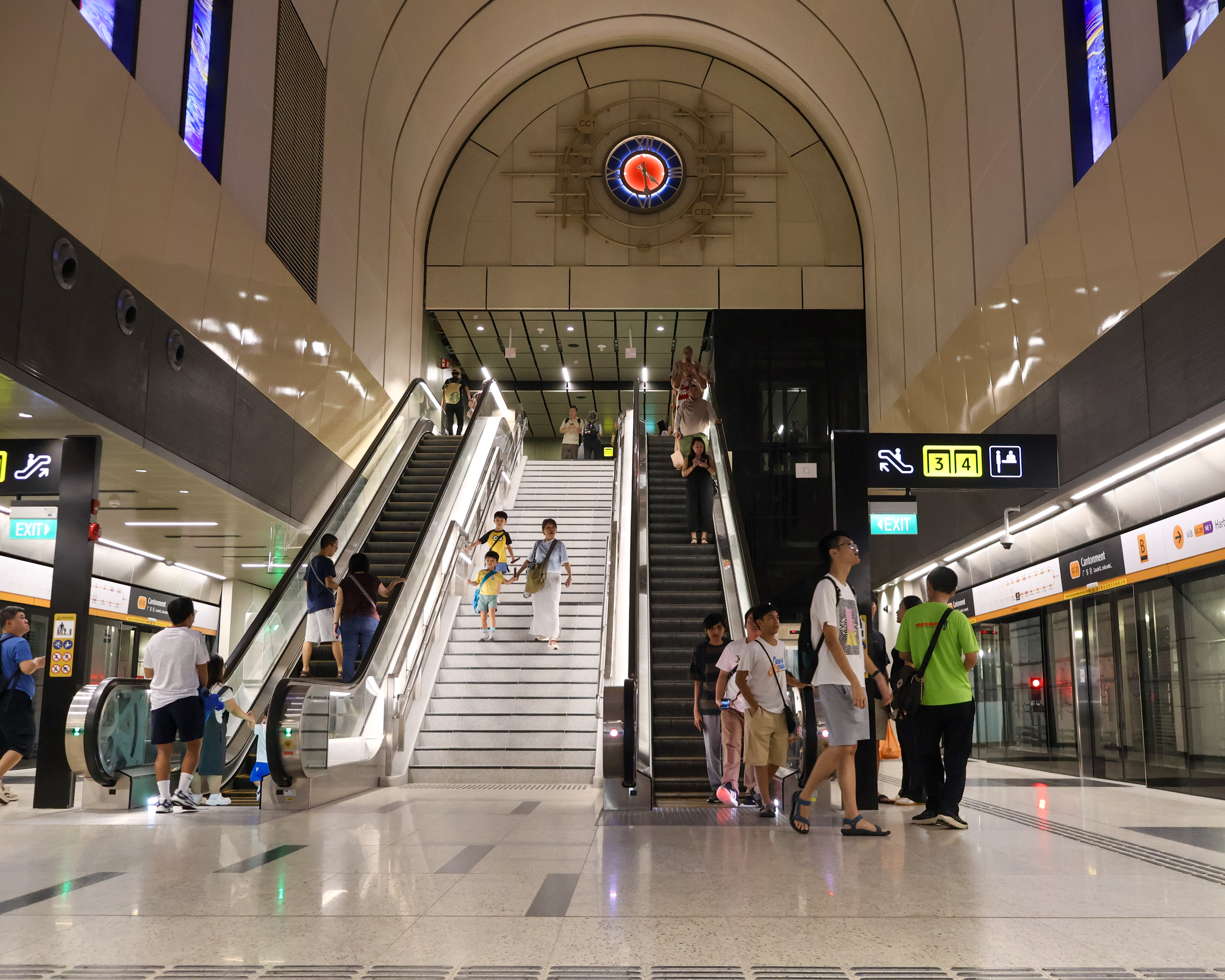
Interior of Cantonment station with the analogue clock

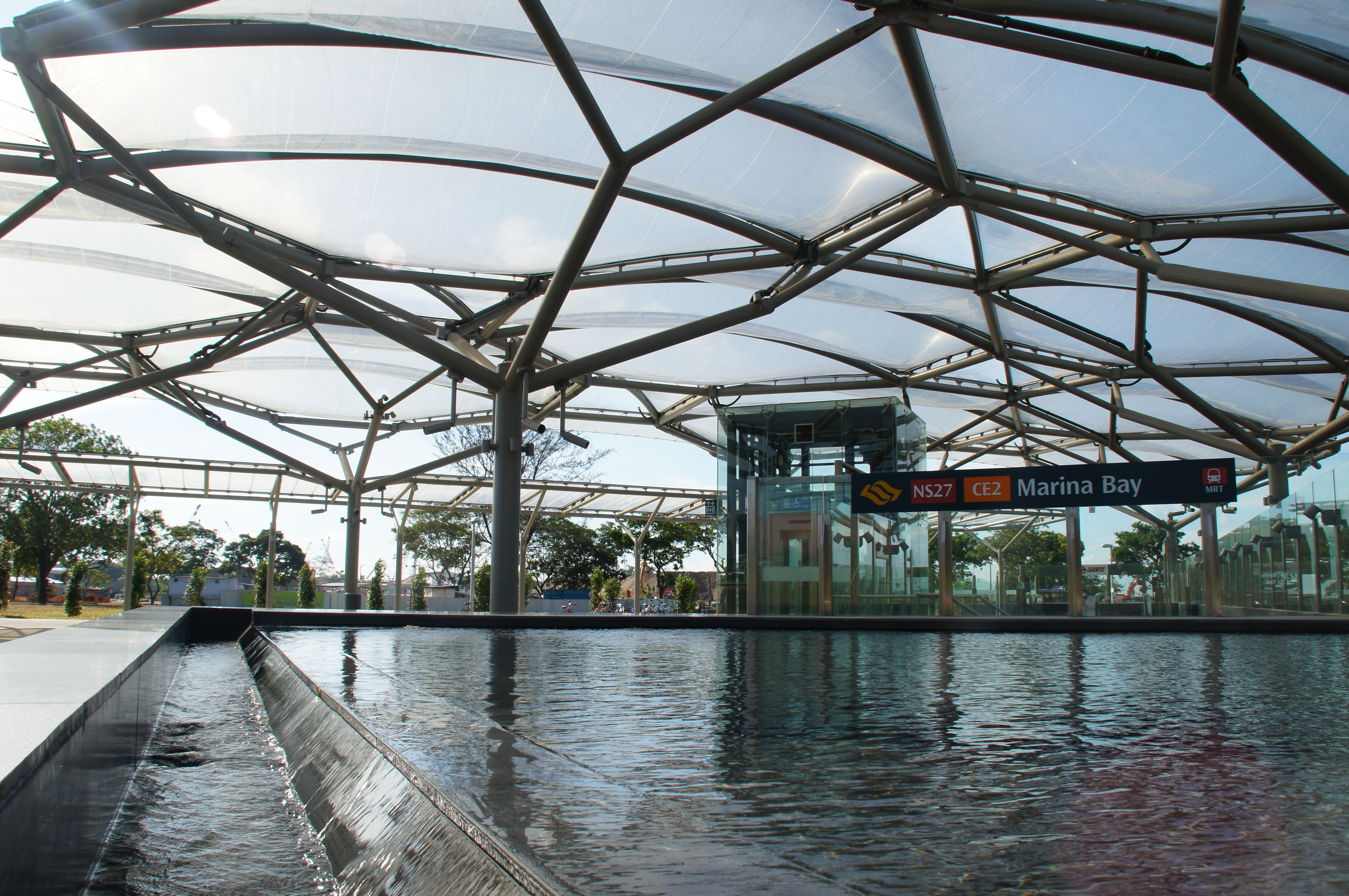
The transculent canopy above the reflective pool at the Marina Bay station entrance

The designs of two stations on the CCL – Bras Basah and Stadium – were commissioned through the Marine Line Architectural International Design Competition. Organised by the LTA Architecture Division, the competition sought to raise the profile of MRT architecture both locally and internationally while securing high-quality designs for the two stations. It was conducted in collaboration with the Singapore Institute of Architects, which nominated five senior Singaporean architects – Alfred Wong, Tham Tuck Cheong, William Lim, Mok Yew Fun and Raymond Woo – to serve on the jury. The competition was intended to be "for architects, by architects", with an anonymous selection process and an independent judging process without LTA influence. Bras Basah and Stadium were selected for the competition because they presented distinct design challenges. According to LTA's senior design manager Andrew Mead, Bras Basah station's location in the Civic District gave it strategic importance, while Stadium station had to accommodate large surges of passengers generated by events at the surrounding sports venues. The competition was conducted in two phases: an "ideas" phase in Stage I, followed by a design development phase in Stage II, where eight shortlisted teams each received a S$30,000 honorarium to prepare detailed design proposals in confidential consultation with LTA's Technical Advisory Group. WOHA won the competition for both stations, which Mead noted that it was a coincidence.

Bras Basah's station design resolves two contradictory conditions needed for the station: allowing a visual connection to the exterior to enhance the travel experience for the commuters, and enabling the station to blend into the landscape in the historic district and park location. A reflection pool doubles as the station's roof, allowing natural light to enter through skylights while serving as a landscape feature at ground level. This reduces the need for artificial lighting during the day, while the natural illumination enhances wayfinding and passenger safety. The ventilation shafts of the station blends into the landscape, avoiding obstruction of the view across the site to the surrounding civic buildings. Bras Basah station is 35 metres (115 ft) below ground and among the deepest stations on the network. The station was awarded the "Best Transport Building" at the World Architecture Festival in 2009, and the Award for International Architecture at the American Institute of Architects 2010 National Architecture Awards. In addition, it won the Chicago Athenaeum and the European Centre for Architecture Art Design and Urban Studies and International Architecture Awards in 2011.

Stadium station features an open-air concourse and plaza space to accommodate the crowds and prevent overcrowding within the station. The open-ended station allows it to be linked to future developments around the station at ground level. The interior contrasts a straight side against a curved opposite side. According to WOHA, the design was a rotation of the original concept, with the proposed bridge becoming the curved side and the ground plane forming the straight side. The curve side and the grey colour scheme reference the old National Stadium, which was demolished for the current Singapore Sports Hub. The station has a grand spacious interior inspired by European train stations built in the 19th century, with the skylight provide natural illumination to the platforms, enhancing their visual character and reducing the need for extensive signage. The station exterior was clad in ribbed aluminium to create an ambiguous appearance, appearing soft or hard depending on the lighting conditions and time of day. This station was awarded "Design Of The Year" of the President's Design Award in 2010, the 9th SIA Architectural Design Awards for the Industrial, Transport & Infrastructure, the Award for International Architecture by the Australian Institute of Architects and the 2010 International Architecture Award by the Chicago Athenaeum and the European Centre for Architecture Art Design and Urban Studies. It was also one of the finalists for the 2008 World Architecture Festival.

Marina Bay CCL station was designed by Aedas, Quarry Bay & Aedas Pte Ltd (Station Architect). Visibility, integration and efficiency were the design's focal points, as the station entrances need to integrate into the park where the station is located. The translucent canopy and large entrance allow more natural light to illuminate the underground concourse. To limit the visual impact of the station to the surrounding park landscape, only the lift, escalators, the lightweight ETFE canopy and the reflective pool are visible from street level, giving users a full view of the park from the station entrance. The reflective pool also provides a smooth transition between the exits and the park. The station design was the winner of the Small Project Award at the World Architecture Festival in 2012. Other awards includes the Land Transport Excellence Awards 2012 (as the Best Design Rail / Road Infrastructure – Project Partner), the 2013 UIPT Asia-Pacific Grow with Public Transport Award and honourable mention for the Singapore Institute of Architects Architectural Design Awards 2012.

The stations of CCL6 were designed by RDC Architects. Each station incorporates design elements reflecting the respective area's history and character. The metallic finishes of Keppel station reference the nearby port, and the station's ventilation shafts on the surface resemble the Singapore Cable Car that connects Mount Faber and HarbourFront to Sentosa. Cantonment station's design is inspired by the former Tanjong Pagar Railway Station. To protect the historic terminal's shallow foundations, Cantonment was built deep underground, creating a spacious double-volume hall featuring a curved roof and 24 vertical glass murals above the platforms. Installed at one end of the platform is a large analogue clock featuring the interchanges of the CCL, framed by two circular rings representing the line. Prince Edward Road station's design reflects Singapore's maritime heritage with the station's passenger service centre inspired by the hull of a wooden ship, complemented by cascading ceiling panels resembling waves. Transport Minister Jeffrey Siow remarked that the CCL6 stations were among the "most beautifully designed stations on the MRT network".

=== Artworks ===
Thirty-four station artworks are displayed across the CCL as part of the MRT network's Art in Transit programme. Following the programme's initial success on the NEL, the programme expanded for its second instla on the CCL with the objective of broadening the definition of transit art. The programme introduced new avenues for public participation, including open artwork proposals and an international seat design competition. Six winning entries from the public competitions were implementated for the CCL stations.

Karen Lim from the National University of Singapore Museum was the curator of the CCL Art in Transit programme. To diversify the artistic line-up, Lim invited a younger generation of practitioners from varied disciplines, including performance artists, photographers, graphic designers, and computer engineers. The LTA also appointed an eight-member Art Review Panel to safeguard artistic integrity and provide institutional guidance throughout the selection process. Chaired by Kwok Kian Chow, this multidisciplinary panel examined proposals from various creative and bureaucratic perspectives to identify potential structural pitfalls and ensure the art complemented the physical design of the space.

Because the CCL utilises smaller three-car trains, the stations and their respective artworks were scaled down and realised through highly collaborative production teams focusing on cost-effectiveness and quality. Many pieces employ digital production techniques, such as printing directly onto aluminium cladding panels to preserve Yek Wong's vibrant neon colours or creating high-quality photographic prints of Sarkasi Said's traditional wax-resist batik paintings. The line also accommodates three-dimensional installations, like Jane Lee's The Coin Mat at Bartley, and new media projection arts requiring specialised technical maintenance. The programme also honours legacy art by featuring veteran practitioners, including a massive woodcut mural by Lim Mu Hue at Esplanade and a re-commissioned sculpture by Tay Chee Toh at Marina Bay station.

Artwork list
Station code	Station name	Artwork name	Artist(s)
CC1	Dhoby Ghaut	Man and Environment	Baet Yeok Kuan
CC2	Bras Basah	The Amazing Neverending Underwater Adventures!	Tan Kai Syng
CC3	Esplanade	A Piece of Ice-Clear Heart	Lim Mu Hue
CC4	Promenade	Dreams in Social Cosmic Odyssey	PHUNK
CC5	Nicoll Highway	Re-Claiming The Peripherals	Khiew Huey Chian
CC6	Stadium	The Perfect Moment	Roy Zhang
CC7	Mountbatten	Lord Mountbatten Thinks of Pink	Jason Wee
CC8	Dakota	Little Things, Little Stories	A Dose of Light
CC9	Paya Lebar	The Signs of Times	Salleh Japar
CC10	MacPherson	Virtuous Cycle	Kay Kok Chung Oi
CC11	Tai Seng	Equilibrium	Francis Ng
CC12	Bartley	The Coin Mat	Jane Lee
CC13	Serangoon	View of Life	Sarkasi Said
CC14	Lorong Chuan	Through the Looking Glass	A Dose of Light & Yoma Studio
CC15	Bishan	Move!	Soh Ee Shaun
CC16	Marymount	Superstring	Joshua Yang
CC17	Caldecott	The Cartography of Memories	Hazel Lim
CC19	Botanic Gardens	Aquatic Fauna No. 1	Lam Hoi Lit & Chua Chye Teck
CC20	Farrer Road	Art Lineage	Erzan Bin Adam
CC21	Holland Village	Holland Beat	Jeremy Sharma
CC22	Buona Vista	The Tree of Life	Gilles Massot
CC23	one-north	A Visual Narrative of Pandemonic Rhythmic Movement	Yek Wong
CC24	Kent Ridge	Poetry Mix-Up	Mixed Reality Lab
CC25	Haw Par Villa	Eroclamation	Tan Wee Lit
CC26	Pasir Panjang	Lieutenant Adnan	Ho Tzu Nyen
CC27	Labrador Park	Without Which / Would Have Been / Impossible	Heman Chong
CC28	Telok Blangah	Notes Towards a Museum of Cooking Pot Bay	Michael Lee
CC29	HarbourFront	Commuting Waves	Jason Ong
CC30	Keppel	Uncontainable Dreams	Kenneth Koh Qibao
CC31	Cantonment	The Journey Between	Han Sai Por
CC32	Prince Edward Road	Doppler	Gerald Leow
CC33	Marina Bay	Train Rides on Rainy Days	Nah Yong En
CC33	Marina Bay	Flowers in Blossom II	Tay Chee Toh
CC34	Bayfront	When the Ship Comes In	Lee Wen

In addition to the station artworks, six of the CCL interchange stations feature the art seats Matrix and Rain by Lui Honfay and Yasmine Chan. These designs were selected from an international design competition launched at the 10th Venice Biennale, which attracted 376 entries worldwide. As the submissions were judged anonymously, the five-member panel was surprised to discover that both winning designs came from the same Singaporean team.

Art seats
Artwork name	Artist(s)	Station code	Station name
Matrix	Lui Honfay and Yasmine Chan	CC1	Dhoby Ghaut
Matrix	Lui Honfay and Yasmine Chan	CC9	Paya Lebar
Matrix	Lui Honfay and Yasmine Chan	CC13	Serangoon
Matrix	Lui Honfay and Yasmine Chan	CC15	Bishan
Matrix	Lui Honfay and Yasmine Chan	CC22	Buona Vista
Matrix	Lui Honfay and Yasmine Chan	CC29	HarbourFront
Rain	Lui Honfay and Yasmine Chan	CC9	Paya Lebar
Rain	Lui Honfay and Yasmine Chan	CC15	Bishan
Rain	Lui Honfay and Yasmine Chan	CC22	Buona Vista

== Notes and references ==
=== Sources ===
- Carnot, Michel; Demaya, Bernard; Jourdain, Pierre-Damien (2010). URBALIS – Mastering Train Control Performance. Research Publishing Services. doi:10.3850/978-981-08-6396-8_P071. ISBN 978-981-08-6396-8.
- Champaud, Xavier (October 2005). CCL – The Longest Automatic Metro Line in the World. Institution of Railway Signal Engineers Technical Convention. Singapore: Institution of Railway Signal Engineers.
- Cheong, Colin (2012). The Circle Line, Linking All Lines (PDF). Singapore: Land Transport Authority. ISBN 978-981-4342-02-5.
- Feng, Zengkun (2017). Downtown Line: Soaring to new heights (PDF). Singapore: Straits Times Press. ISBN 978-981-4747-66-0. OCLC 1003852882.
- Kok, Yen Hui; Lee, Beng Hooi; Toh, Timothy; Tan, Kian Tong (2010). Challenges Faced in Managing Signalling Project for Singapore Circle Line. Research Publishing Services. doi:10.3850/978-981-08-6396-8_T3-03. ISBN 978-981-08-6396-8.
- Mead, Andrew (2010). Commissioning Award-winning Architecture for the Circle Line. Research Publishing Services. doi:10.3850/978-981-08-6396-8_T2-01. ISBN 978-981-08-6396-8.
- Kumarasamy, Jeyatharan (2017). "Geology and Its Impact on the Construction of Singapore MRT Circle Line". The Geotechnical Engineering Journal of the SEAGS & AGSSEA. 48: 2431. doi:10.14456/SEAGJ.2017.20.
- Zhuang, Justin (2013). Art in transit : Circle Line MRT. Singapore: Land Transport Authority. ISBN 978-981-07-4982-8. OCLC 854958677.
