= Kim Chuan Depot =

Train and bus depot in Singapore

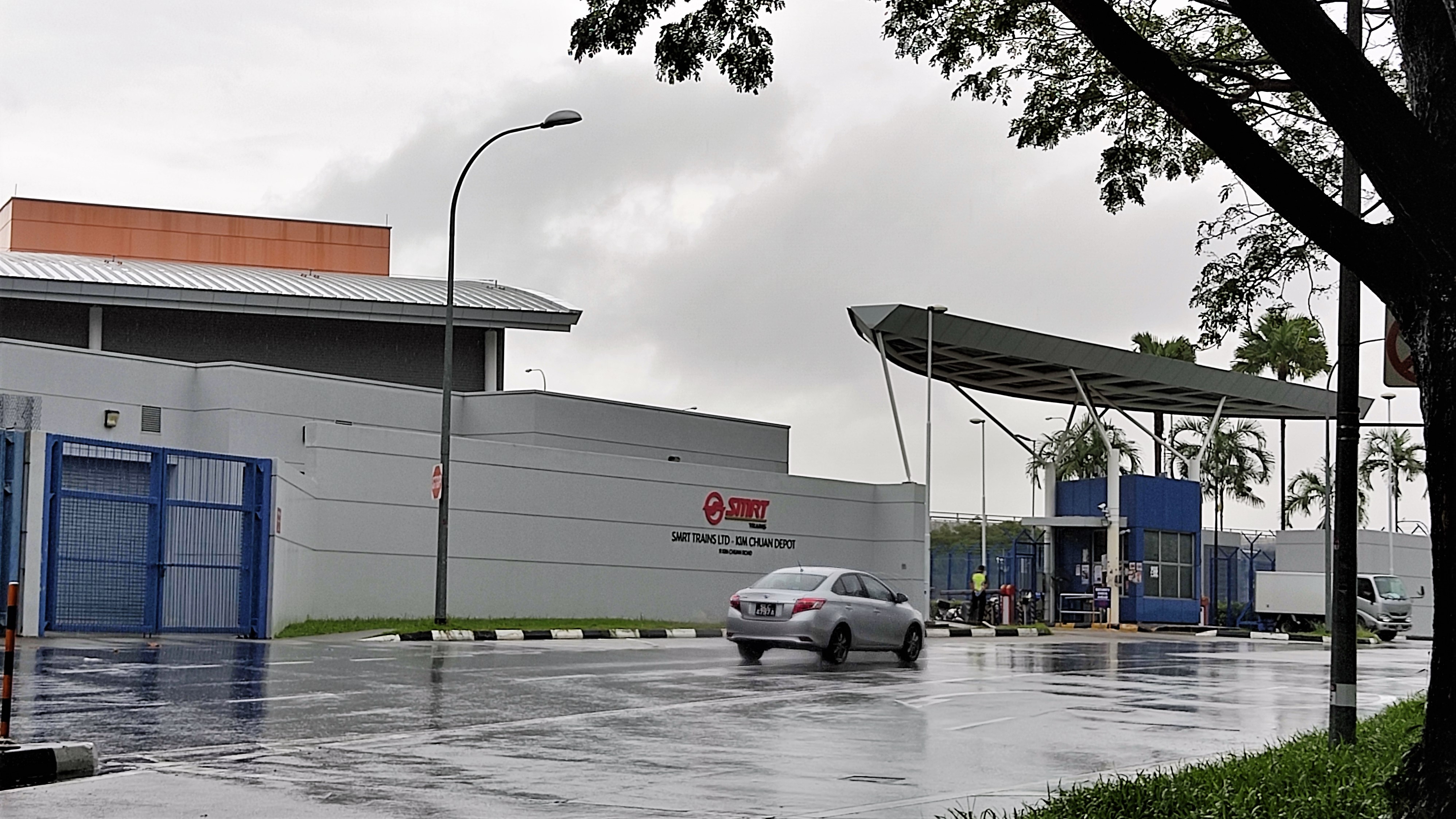
- Entrance to the depot
- Interactive map of Kim Chuan Depot

Location
- Location: 11 Kim Chuan Road, Singapore 537065 (Train); 7 Hougang Close, Singapore 536215 (Bus)
- Coordinates: 1°20′27.97″N 103°53′14.15″E

Characteristics
- Owner: Land Transport Authority
- Operator: SMRT Corporation
- Depot code: KCD
- Type: At-grade (Bus); Underground (Train)
- Roads: Kim Chuan Road, Upper Paya Lebar Road
- Rolling stock: Alstom Metropolis C830; Alstom Metropolis C830C; Alstom Metropolis C851E
- Routes served: CCL Circle Line

History
- Opened: 4 March 2009; 17 years ago (Train); 13 June 2027; 8 months' time (Bus)

Kim Chuan Depot is an underground train and multi-storey bus depot in Hougang, Singapore. It serves the Circle Line (CCL) on the Mass Rapid Transit (MRT) system, providing maintenance, stabling and operational facilities.

The depot became the first in Singapore to serve two independently operated MRT lines when it temporarily acted as the only depot for the Downtown Line (DTL), until the adjacent Tai Seng Facility Building became operational on 21 October 2017. The DTL is also served by Gali Batu Depot and the East Coast Integrated Depot.

== History ==
In June 2002, the Land Transport Authority (LTA) awarded the contract to build the underground Kim Chuan Depot to a joint venture between Hock Lian Seng Infrastructure and Hock Chuan Ann Construction for S$296 million (2002) (US$165.31 million). By then, excavation for the depot was almost finished; it was expected for the depot to be completed by 2006. Kim Chuan Depot was to be part of Phase 2 of the CCL, a 5 kilometres (3.1 mi) route of 5 stations from Stadium Boulevard to Upper Paya Lebar Road and Bartley Road. Structural provisions were made for commercial and residential developments above the depot.

To facilitate the construction of the depot, part of the Kim Chuan Village was acquired in September 2000 for the construction of the depot and the road viaduct. The Kim Chuan Road was permanently closed from Hougang Avenue 3 to Kim Chuan Drive on 27 June 2002. On 25 October 2002, part of the Hougang Avenue 3 was realigned and on 25 November 2002, part of the Kim Chuan Road was closed.

The project cost S$297 million to construct and 2.1 million cubic metres of soil had to be excavated for its construction. Touted as the world's biggest underground depot, it officially opened on 4 March 2009, employing 300 staff members.

The depot was used for the temporary storage and light maintenance of rolling stock for the Downtown Line, before the completion of the Tai Seng Facility Building. It also provided a route in which Downtown Line trains can be towed from the depot to its operational line via the Circle Line tracks. Once the main depot, Gali Batu Depot was completed with stage 2 of the Downtown Line, Kim Chuan Depot simply provides a route for newly delivered Downtown Line trains to be transferred in to the Tai Seng Facility Building.

=== Extension ===
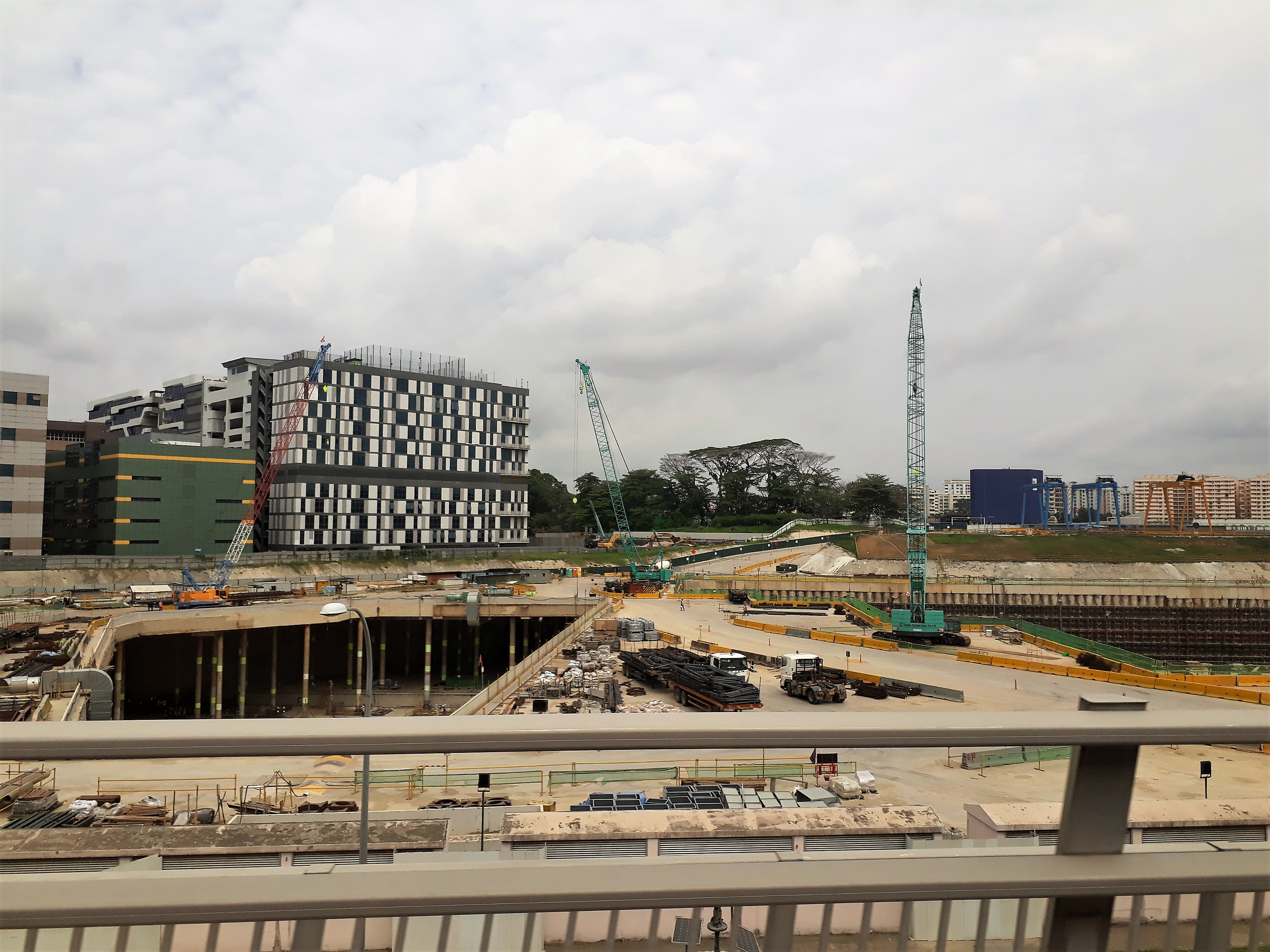
Construction site of the extension in 2020

On 29 October 2015, LTA announced the extension of Kim Chuan depot in tandem with the Circle Line stage 6 extension. The extension called for the depot to be expanded underground to almost double its land area and stabling capacity from 70 to 133 trains. The integrated depot will also house 550 buses on the plot of land above the underground train depot.

Contract 821A for the construction of Kim Chuan Depot extension and its associated facilities was awarded to Woh Hup (Private) Limited at a sum of S$1.21 billion in September 2017. By May 2026, the extension had begun operation.

In December 2025, the Serangoon–Eunos bus package under the bus contracting model was put out for tender. Having won the tender, SMRT Buses will operate the 26 bus services under the package from Kim Chuan Bus Depot from 13 June 2027.

== Design ==
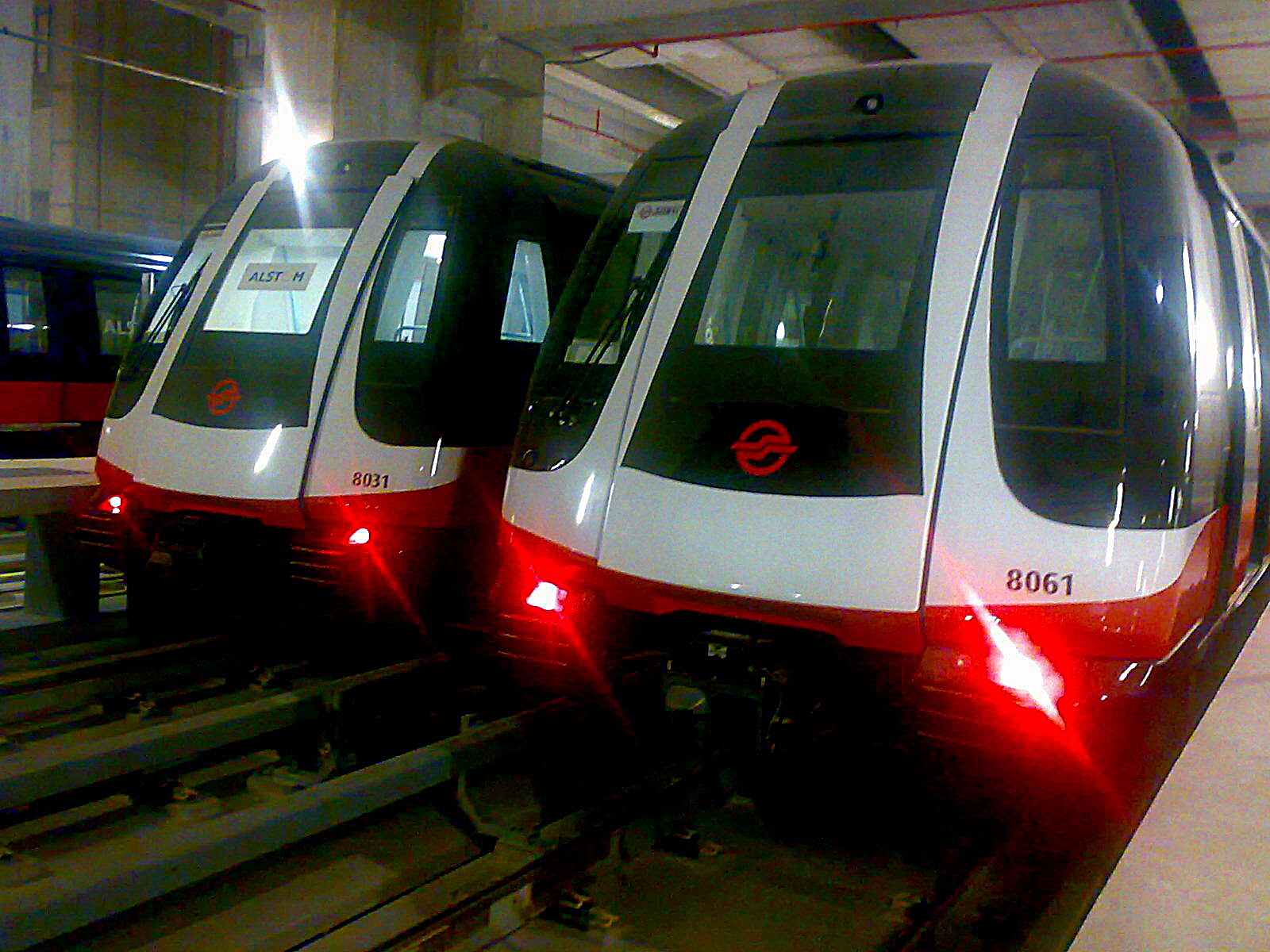
Alstom Metropolis C830 trains at Kim Chuan Depot in 2008

Kim Chuan Depot contains the main operation control centre for the Circle Line, maintenance facility, stabling areas, and ancillary facilities such as the train wash and workshops. It also houses an automatic storage and retrieval system, a warehouse that stores spare parts for the rolling stocks and other equipments. The depot is connected to the adjacent Tai Seng Facility Building on the east side of the facility and is operated in tandem with the Tai Seng Maintenance Facility.

The depot is accessible via an administration building along Kim Chuan Road, containing offices, a warehouse, a canteen and a 66 kilovolt substation is located above the depot. The remaining 3 hectares (7.4 acres) of land left empty will be used for light industrial use with buildings on it up to 9 storeys high. The depot is located between Tai Seng station and Bartley station on the Circle Line and has 4 reception tracks: 2 tracks clockwise-bound towards Tai Seng station and 2 tracks anticlockwise-bound towards Bartley station.
