= SMRT Trains =

Singapore train operator

SMRT Trains Limited

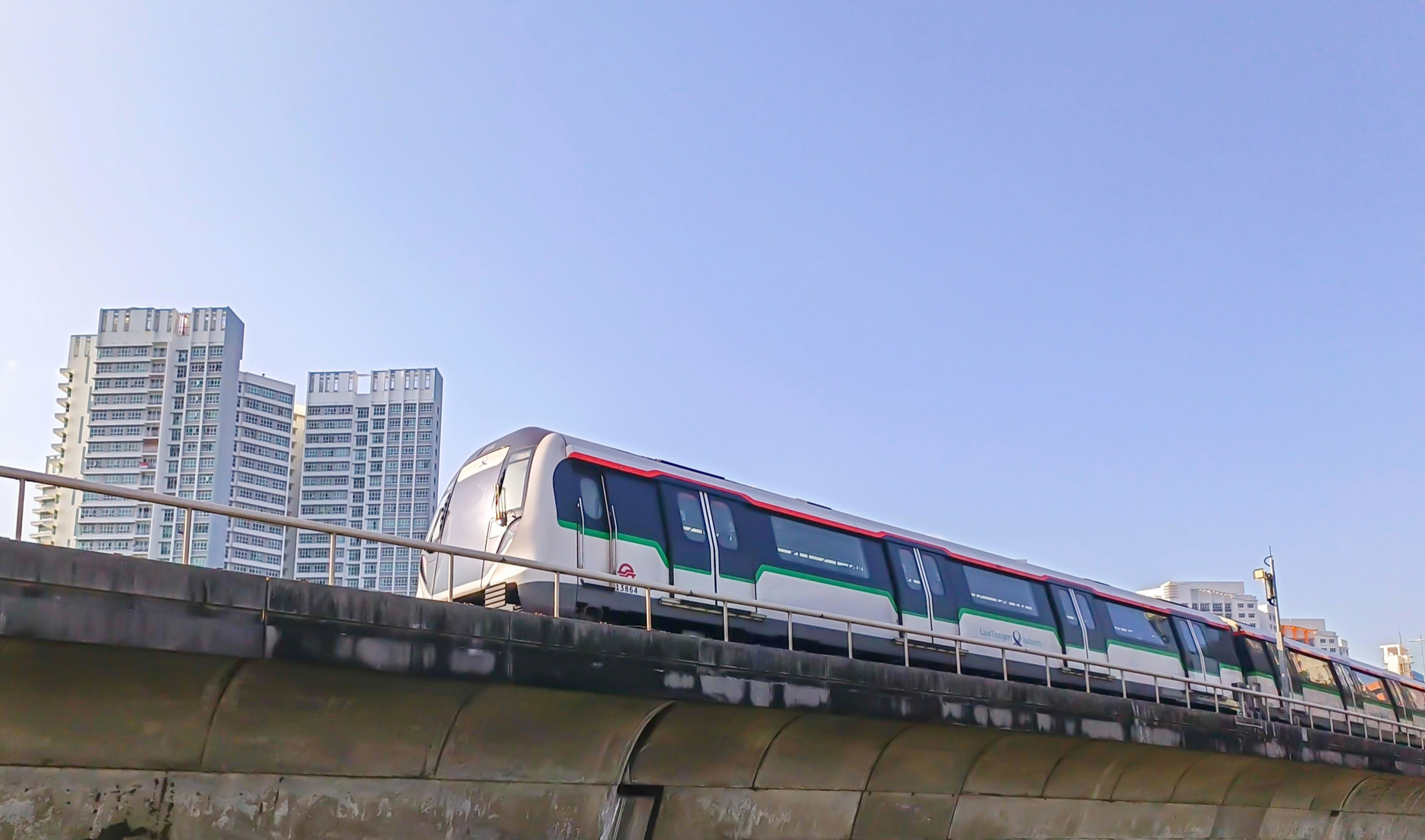
- An R151 train operated by SMRT Trains.
- Type: Subsidiary
- Industry: Public transport rail operator
- Founded: 6 August 1987; 39 years ago as Mass Rapid Transit Corporation (MRTC)
- Headquarters: 2 Tanjong Katong Road, #08-01, Paya Lebar Quarter (PLQ 3), Singapore 437161
- Area served: Singapore
- Key people: Seah Moon Ming (chairman); Lee Fook Sun (deputy chairman, Trains); Ngien Hoon Ping (Group CEO); Lam Sheau Kai (president, Rail)
- Services: Railways
- Revenue: ▲ S$918.2 million (FY2024/25)
- Operating income: ▼ S$4.9 million (FY2024/25)
- Net income: ▼ S$6.9 million (FY2024/25)
- Parent: SMRT Corporation
- Website: www.smrt.com.sg
- Footnotes: Financials as of 31 March 2025

SMRT Trains Limited is a rail operator in Singapore and a wholly owned subsidiary of SMRT Corporation. It was established in 1987 as the Mass Rapid Transit Corporation (MRTC). On 31 December 2001, the company adopted its present name to avoid confusion with the then upcoming North East Line (NEL), which would be operated by SBS Transit. SMRT Trains currently operates the North–South Line (NSL), East–West Line (EWL), Circle Line (CCL) and the Thomson–East Coast Line (TEL) as part of the wider Singapore MRT network.

== History ==
SMRT Trains Limited was incorporated as the rail subsidiary arm of the parent company SMRT Corporation, to oversee rail operations brought over from the previously state-owned Mass Rapid Transit Corporation (MRTC).

=== Mass Rapid Transit Corporation (MRTC) ===
The Singapore MRT Limited was incorporated on 6 August 1987, and signed the licence and operating agreement (LOA) with MRTC, a government-run corporation till 1997. On 7 November 1987, MRTC began operations on Singapore's first MRT segment, comprising five stations from Yio Chu Kang to Toa Payoh. Following the merger of MRTC into the Land Transport Authority (LTA) on 1 September 1995, a statutory board, MRTC's operational functions were transferred to SMRT Corporation, a private company de jure but remained state-owned through Temasek. On 1998, the light rail operation on the Bukit Panjang LRT line was formed and was called Singapore LRT Limited. On 31 December 2001, both Singapore MRT Limited and Singapore LRT Limited were merged into the present name, SMRT Trains.

=== Transition to New Rail Financing Framework (NRFF) ===
On 15 July 2016, SMRT Trains and its subsidiary SMRT Light Rail concluded discussions on the transition of the North–South and East–West lines (NSEWL), the Circle Line (CCL) and the Bukit Panjang LRT (BPLRT) to the New Rail Financing Framework (NRFF). The framework, announced by the Government in 2008 under the Land Transport Master-plan, was introduced as an enhancement to the 1996 Rail Financing Framework, and was first implemented for the Downtown Line (DTL) under SBS Transit in 2011. SMRT transited to a 15-year contract under the new framework from 1 October 2016, with the transfer of ownership of all its rail assets at a net value of $1.06 billion to the government. With that, the MRT network was semi re-nationalised.

== Mass Rapid Transit ==
SMRT Trains currently operates a fleet consisting of four rolling stocks built on its two heavy rail lines (the North–South Line and the East–West Line) – namely C151A, C151B, C151C and R151, identified by the relevant build contracts. Until 2024, they operated the C651 and C751B fleets which have since been fully phased out. In addition, it operates the C830, C830C and C851E rolling stocks, which ply on the Circle Line. SMRT Trains is also licensed to operate the T251 rolling stocks, which ply on the Thomson–East Coast Line. SMRT Light Rail operates the C801A, C801B and formerly C801 rolling stocks on the Bukit Panjang LRT. On 26 September 2025, the last of the C151 has also been retired, with a final commemorative ride held on 28 September 2025 for select members of the public.

The main colour scheme for all trains are black with a red stripe and grey band at the bottom. C651 is the only train model with an exterior livery of white and red stripes. C801 is the only train model with an exterior livery of blue and red stripes. C151B and C801A are the only train models with an exterior livery of the new SMRT pixelated livery, which consist of white, red, black and yellow stripes and pixel livery. In addition, C151C and R151 bear the new LTA livery, which is black with green and red stripes. T251 also bears the new LTA livery, which is black with burnt sienna and yellow stripes. The new liveries typically consist of a black/white background, with the LTA logo and a single long stipe of the respective line's colour going down the side end to end.

=== Current fleet ===
Name	Image	Maximum Speed (km/h)		Trains built	Cars built	Cars per set	Lines served	Built	Number In Service	Introduction into service
Name	Image	Design	Service	Trains built	Cars built	Cars per set	Lines served	Built	Number In Service	Introduction into service
C151A		90	80	35	210	6	North–South Line; East–West Line	2011–2014; 2026–mid-2030s (Note: Refurbishment.)	35	27 May 2011
C151B		90	80	45	270	6	North–South Line; East–West Line	2014–2017; 2025–mid-2030s	45	16 April 2017
C151C		90	80	12	72	6	North–South Line; East–West Line	2017–2018; 2026–mid-2030s	12	30 September 2018
R151		90	80	106	636	6	North–South Line; East–West Line	2020–2026	80	4 June 2023
C830		90	78	40	120	3	Circle Line	2006–2008	40	28 May 2009
C830C		90	78	24	72	3	Circle Line	2014–2015	24	26 June 2015
C851E		90	78	23	69	3	Circle Line	2021–2025	23	13 April 2026
T251		100	90	91	364	4	Thomson–East Coast Line	2017–2022	91	31 January 2020

- The trains are classified as contracts, unlike Japan, which uses "series", and other countries, which use "class".

=== Former rolling stock ===
Name	Image	Maximum Speed (km/h)		Trains built	Cars built	Cars per set	Lines served	Built	Introduction into service	Retirement from service
Name	Image	Design	Service	Trains built	Cars built	Cars per set	Lines served	Built	Introduction into service	Retirement from service
C151		90	80	66	396	6	North–South Line; East–West Line	1986–1989; 2006–2008	7 November 1987	28 September 2025
C651		90	80	19	114	6	North–South Line; East–West Line	1994–1995; 2016–2018 (incomplete)	2 May 1995	30 September 2024
C751B		90	80	21	126	6	North–South Line; East–West Line	1999–2001	28 January 2000	30 September 2024

- The trains are classified as contracts unlike Japan which uses "series" and other countries which use "class".

== Light Rail Transit ==
SMRT Light Rail operates only one LRT line. The Bukit Panjang LRT line provides feeder connections at Bukit Panjang and Choa Chu Kang towns to the Downtown Line at Bukit Panjang and North–South Line and the upcoming Jurong Region Line at Choa Chu Kang.

=== Current fleet ===
Name	Image	Maximum Speed (km/h)		Trains built	Cars per set	Lines served	Built	Numbers In Service	Introduction into service
Name	Image	Design	Service	Trains built	Cars per set	Lines served	Built	Numbers In Service	Introduction into service
C801A		55	48	13	1	Bukit Panjang LRT	2014–2015	13	19 November 2014
C801B		55	48	19	1	Bukit Panjang LRT	2019–2025	19	1 August 2024

- The trains are classified as contracts unlike Japan which uses "series" other countries which use "class".

=== Former rolling stock ===
Name	Image	Maximum Speed (km/h)		Trains built	Cars per set	Lines served	Built	Introduction into service	Retirement from service
Name	Image	Design	Service	Trains built	Cars per set	Lines served	Built	Introduction into service	Retirement from service
C801		55	48	19	1	Bukit Panjang LRT	1997–1999	6 November 1999	12 September 2025

- The trains are classified as contracts unlike Japan which uses "series" and other countries which use "class".

== Notable incidents on SMRT lines ==
=== Major incidents ===
- Clementi rail accident (5 August 1993) – Before the start of service, a maintenance vehicle spilt oil on the tracks between Clementi and Jurong East. The first ten eastbound trains reported braking problems. At 7:50 am, the eleventh eastbound train stopped at Clementi station for two minutes longer than scheduled after using its emergency brakes. It was subsequently struck by the twelfth eastbound train, which failed to stop in time. A total of 156 passengers were injured.
- Pasir Ris rail accident (22 March 2016) – Two SMRT staff were killed when a train struck them near Pasir Ris station on the East–West Line. Following investigations, the Ministry of Manpower found that SMRT had failed to comply with safety procedures governing track access for 14 years. Former assistant engineer Lim Say Heng was later sentenced to four weeks' imprisonment after pleading guilty to causing the deaths by failing to observe critical safety protocols.
- Joo Koon rail accident (15 November 2017) – Two C151A trains collided at Joo Koon station, injuring 28 people. It was the second train collision in Singapore's MRT history after the 1993 Clementi rail accident.
- Dover train derailment (25 September 2024) – A C151 train suffered a bogie derailment near Dover station, causing extensive damage to tracks and signalling equipment between Dover and Jurong East. The incident resulted in 46 rail breaks, damage to three track switches, and a power trip before the train stalled outside Ulu Pandan Depot. Train services between Jurong East and Buona Vista were suspended from 25 September to 30 September 2024, making it one of the longest unplanned MRT service disruptions in Singapore's history. Services resumed on 1 October 2024 under temporary speed restrictions.
