= Alstom Metropolis C830C =

Class of electric multiple units in Singapore

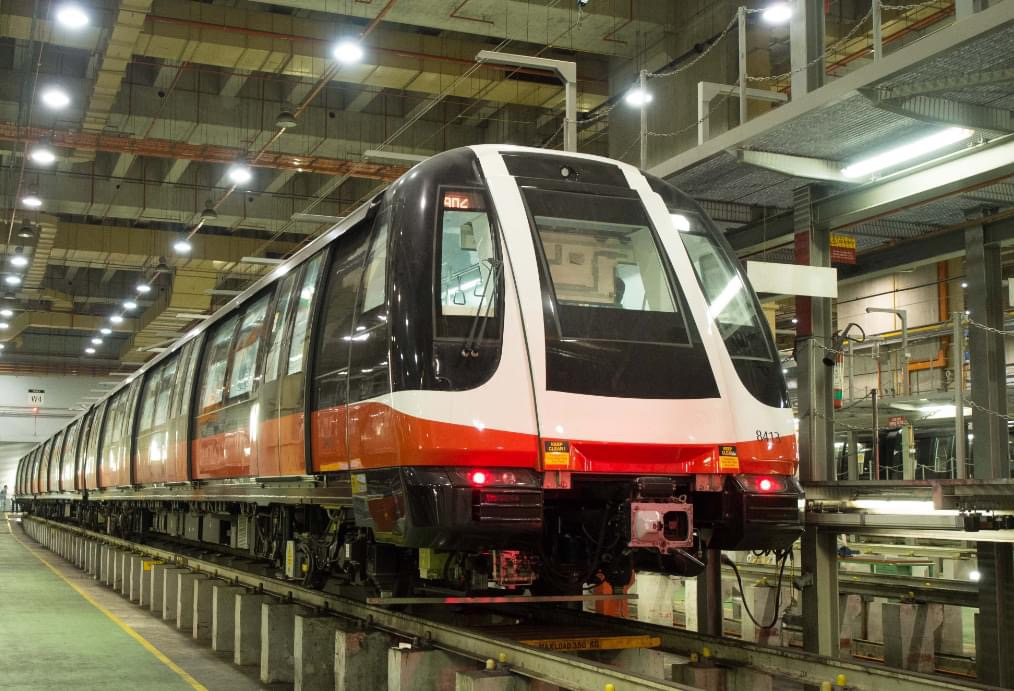
- A C830C train (Set 841) at Kim Chuan Depot

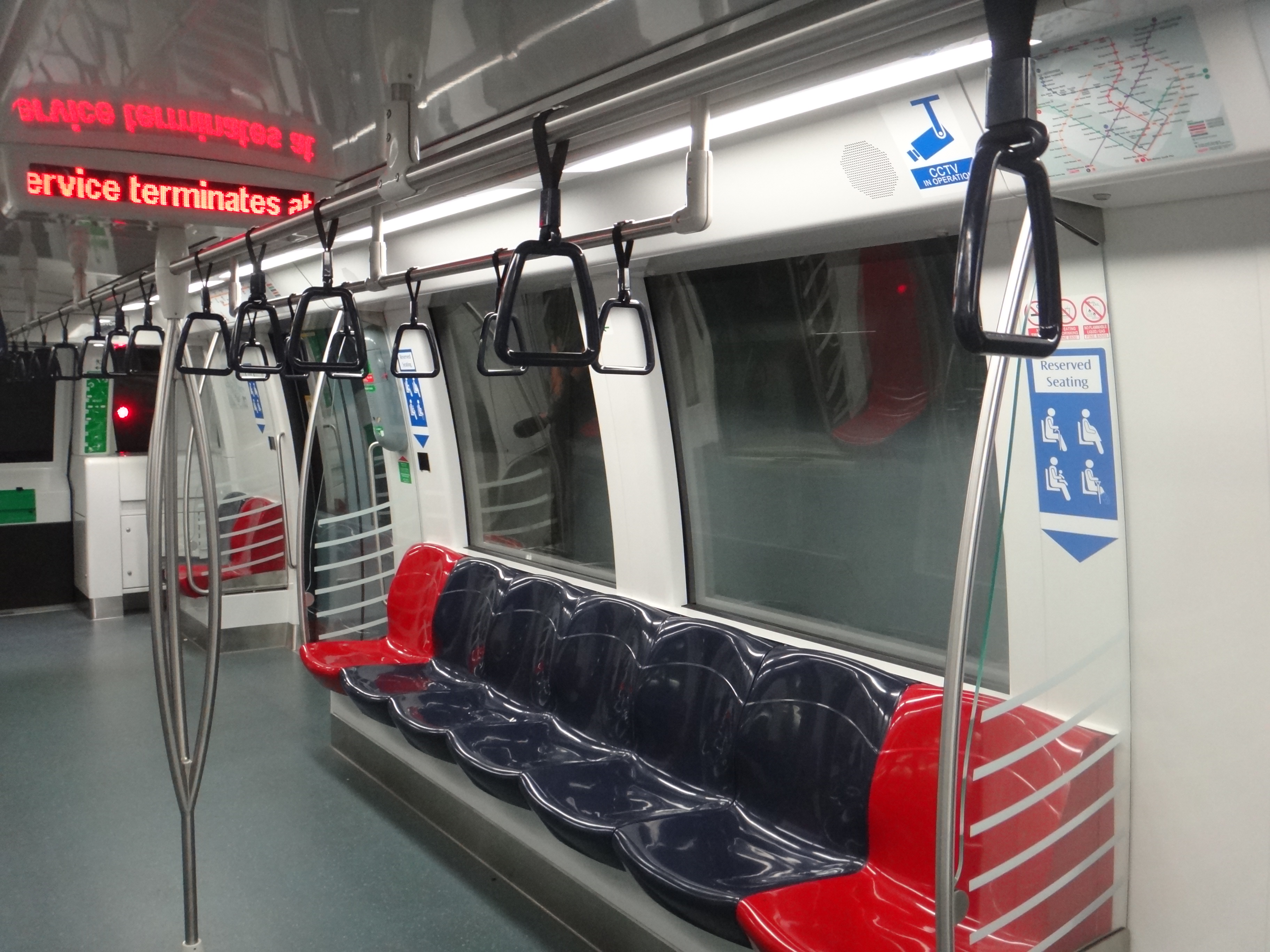
- Interior of C830C.
- Stock type: Electric multiple unit
- In service: 26 June 2015; 11 years ago – present
- Manufacturers: Shanghai Alstom Transport (Alstom and Shanghai Electric)
- Built at: Shanghai, China
- Family name: Metropolis
- Constructed: 2014 – 2015
- Entered service: 26 June 2015; 11 years ago
- Number built: 72 vehicles (24 sets)
- Number in service: 72 vehicles (24 sets)
- Formation: 3 per trainset Mc1–T–Mc2
- Fleet numbers: 841 – 864
- Capacity: 931 passengers
- Operator: SMRT Trains Ltd (SMRT Corporation)
- Depot: Kim Chuan
- Line served: Circle Line

Specifications
- Car body construction: Welded aluminium
- Train length: 70.1 m (229 ft 11 7/8 in)
- Car length: 23.65 m (77 ft 7 1/8 in) (Mc); 22.8 m (74 ft 9 5/8 in) (T)
- Width: 3.2 m (10 ft 6 in)
- Height: 3.7 m (12 ft 1 5/8 in)
- Doors: 1,450 mm (57 1/8 in), 8 per car, 4 per side
- Maximum speed: 90 km/h (56 mph) (design); 78 km/h (48 mph) (service)
- Traction system: Alstom OPTONIX IGBT–VVVF
- Traction motors: 8 × 150 kW (201 hp) 3-phase AC induction motor
- Power output: 1.2 MW (1,609 hp)
- Acceleration: 1.1 m/s^{2} (2.5 mph/s)
- Deceleration: 1.3 m/s^{2} (4.3 ft/s^{2}) (Emergency)
- Electric systems: 750 V DC third rail
- Current collection: Collector shoe
- UIC classification: Bo′Bo′+2′2′+Bo′Bo′
- Braking systems: Regenerative and pneumatic
- Safety systems: Alstom URBALIS 300 moving block CBTC ATC under ATO GoA 4 (UTO), with subsystems of ATP, Iconis ATS and Smartlock CBI
- Coupling system: Scharfenberg
- Track gauge: 1,435 mm (4 ft 8 1/2 in) standard gauge

The Alstom Metropolis C830C is the second generation of communication-based train control (CBTC) electric multiple unit rolling stock in operation on the Circle Line of Singapore's Mass Rapid Transit (MRT) system. 24 trainsets of three cars were manufactured by Shanghai Alstom Transport Co Ltd (a joint venture between Alstom and Shanghai Electric), with deliveries from end June 2014.

== Tender ==
The tender for trains under the contract 830C was opened together with another contract C751C for an additional 18 North East Line trains which closed on 18 July 2011 with five bids. The Land Transport Authority shortlisted all of them, and the tender results were published on 1 February 2012.

S/N	Name of Tenderer	Amount (S$)
1	Alstom Transport S.A. / Alstom Transport (S) Pte Ltd Consortium	134,000,000.00 (Base Tender 1 - Offered in mixed currencies, and hence the differences of amount shown in the tender document.)
2	Kawasaki Heavy Industries, Ltd. / Kawasaki Heavy Industries(Singapore) Pte Ltd & CSR Qingdao Sifang Consortium / Singapore CSR Sifang Railway Vehicles Service Pte. Ltd. Consortium	198,321,046.16 (Base Tender 1)
3	Hyundai Rotem Company	149,121,600.00 (Base Tender 1)
4	Construcciones y Auxiliar de Ferrocarriles, S.A.	115,576,832.68 (Base Tender 1)
5	CRRC Zhuzhou Locomotive (formerly CSR Zhuzhou Electric Locomotive Co., Ltd.) / Siemens Pte Ltd, Singapore Consortium	121,842,307.69 (Base Tender 1)

== Driverless operation ==
The C830C is fully driverless under normal circumstances, using CBTC which do not require traditional "fixed-block track circuits" for determining train position. Instead, they rely on "continuous two-way digital communication" between each controlled train and a wayside control center, which may control an area of a railroad line, a complete line, or a group of lines. Recent studies consistently show that CBTC systems reduce life-cycle costs for the overall rail property and enhance operational flexibility and control.

=== Operational issues ===
Between August and November 2016, about 300 occurrences of loss of signalling communications led to major disruptions on the Circle Line, as well as trains applying their emergency brakes at random. Though the root cause was known to be due to "intermittent signal interference", the exact source could not be traced back.

Through joint investigation efforts by Alstom, IMDA, DSTA, DSO National Laboratories, GovTech, and Rhode & Schwarz, it was discovered on 6 November 2016 that Passenger Vehicle 46 (PV46) had been suffering from faulty signalling hardware, resulting in erroneous signals being transmitted, which caused the signalling system to hang. It was promptly pulled from service to undergo repairs, and has since returned in optimal condition.

== Train formation ==
The coupling configuration of a C830C in revenue service is Mc1–T–Mc2.

Cars of C830C
Car type	Quantity	Driver cab	Motor	Collector shoe	Car length		Wheelchair bay
Car type	Quantity	Driver cab	Motor	Collector shoe	m	ft in	Wheelchair bay
Mc	2	✓	✓	✓	23.65	77 ft 7.1 in	✗
T	1	✗	✗	✓	22.8	74 ft 9.6 in	✓
