= Alstom Metropolis C830 =

Class of electric multiple units in Singapore

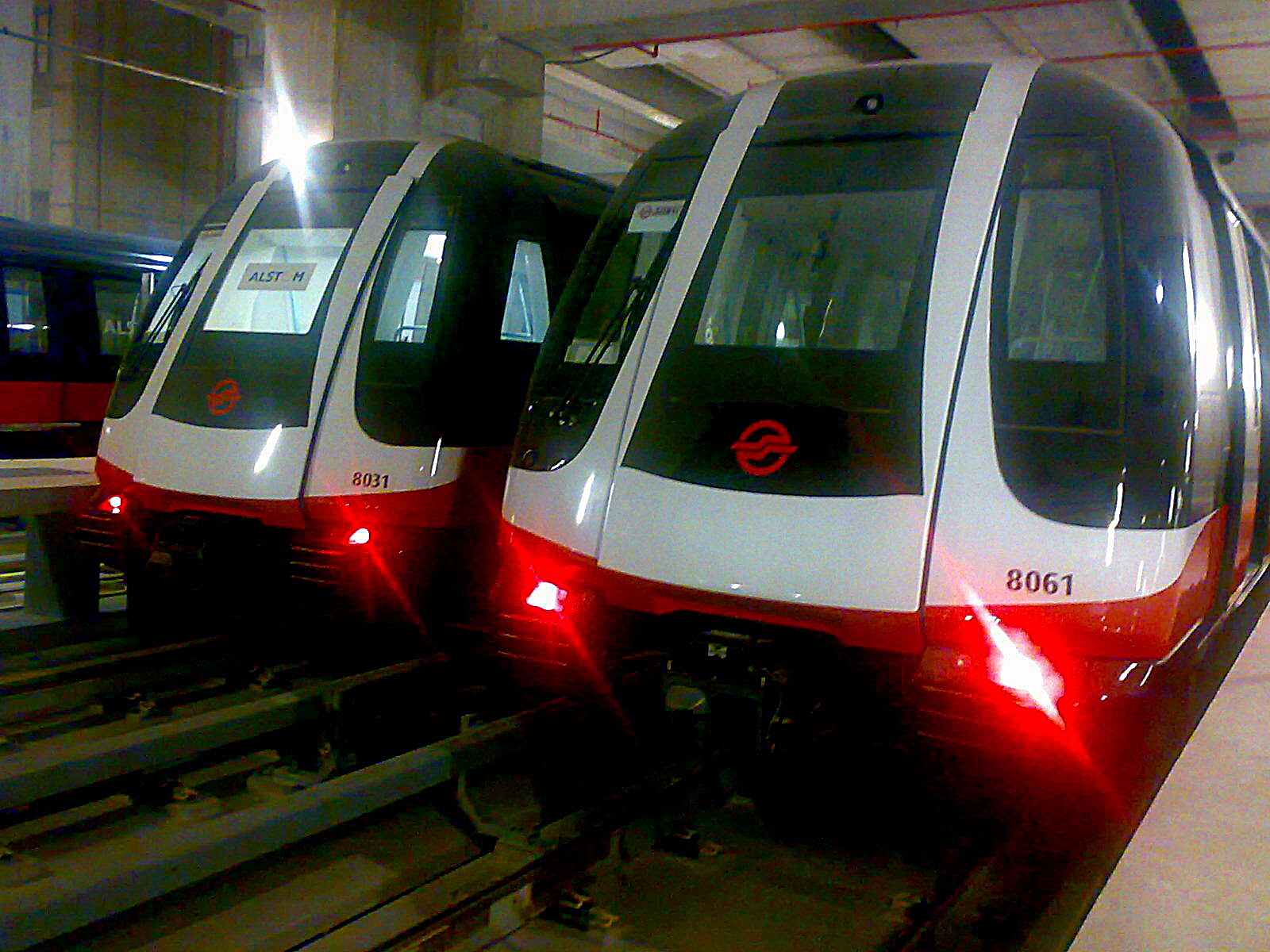
- C830 trains at Kim Chuan Depot

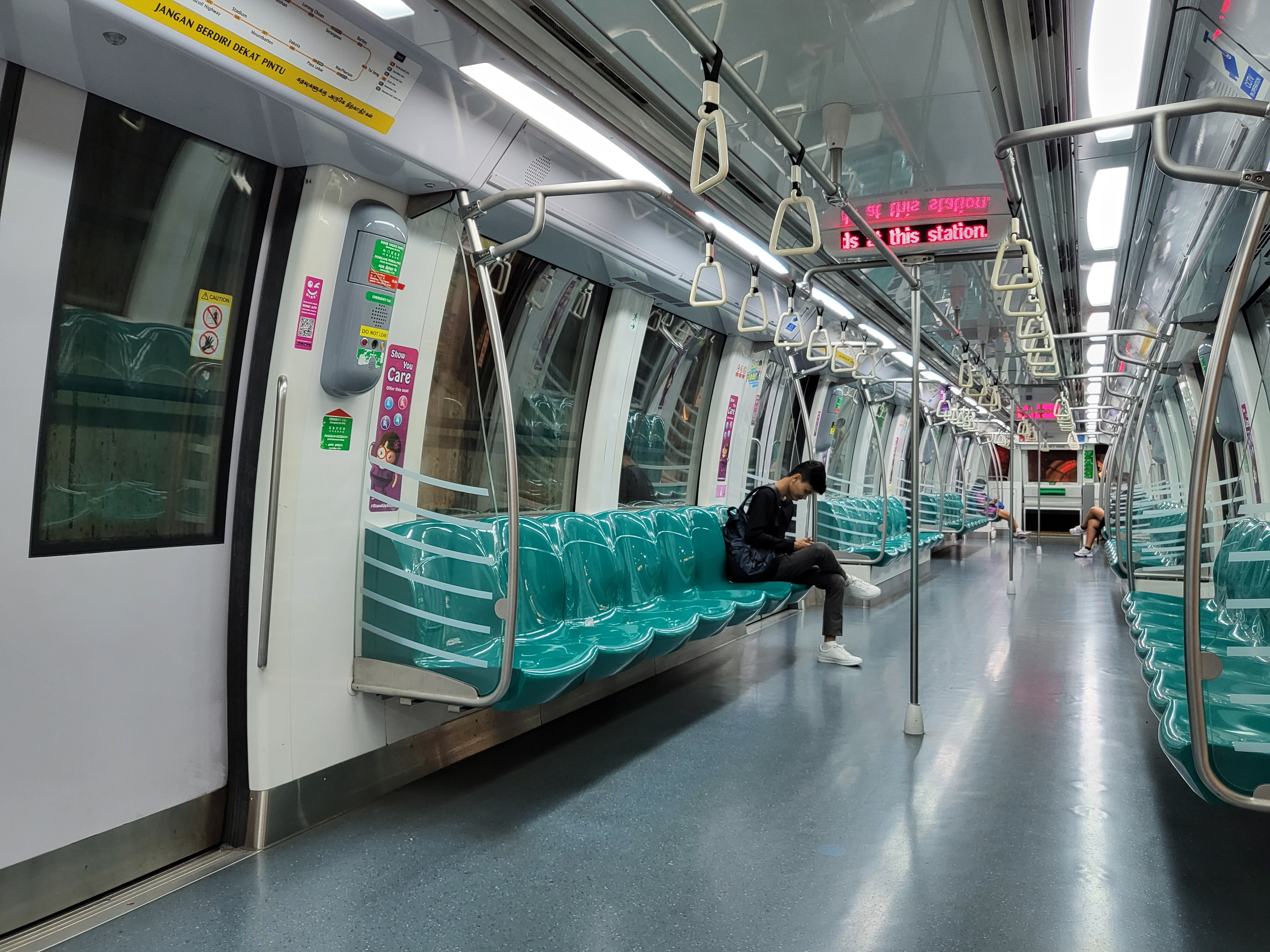
- Interior of the Alstom Metropolis C830 on the Circle Line.
- Stock type: Electric multiple unit
- In service: 28 May 2009; 17 years ago – present
- Manufacturer: Alstom
- Built at: Valenciennes, France
- Family name: Metropolis
- Constructed: 2006 – 2008
- Entered service: 28 May 2009; 17 years ago
- Number built: 120 Vehicles (40 Sets)
- Number in service: 120 Vehicles (40 Sets)
- Formation: 3 per trainset Mc1–T–Mc2
- Fleet numbers: 801 – 840
- Capacity: 931 passengers (148 seats)
- Operator: SMRT Trains (SMRT Corporation)
- Depot: Kim Chuan
- Line served: Circle Line

Specifications
- Car body construction: Welded aluminium
- Train length: 70.1 m (229 ft 11 7/8 in)
- Car length: 23.65 m (77 ft 7 1/8 in) (Mc); 22.8 m (74 ft 9 5/8 in) (T)
- Width: 3.21 m (10 ft 6 3/8 in)
- Height: 3.68 m (12 ft 7/8 in)
- Floor height: 1,110 mm (43 3/4 in)
- Doors: 1,450 mm (57 1/8 in), 8 per car, 4 per side
- Wheel diameter: 850–775 mm (33.5–30.5 in)
- Wheelbase: 2.5 m (8 ft 2 in)
- Maximum speed: 90 km/h (56 mph) (design); 80 km/h (50 mph) (service)
- Weight: 120 t (120 long tons; 130 short tons) (unladen); 199 t (196 long tons; 219 short tons) (fully laden)
- Axle load: 16 t (16 long tons; 18 short tons)
- Traction system: Alstom ONIX IGBT–VVVF
- Traction motors: 8 × Alstom 4LCA 2138 150 kW (200 hp) asynchronous 3-phase AC
- Power output: 1.2 MW (1,600 hp)
- Acceleration: 1.1 m/s^{2} (2.5 mph/s)
- Deceleration: 1.3 m/s^{2} (2.9 mph/s) (Emergency)
- Electric systems: 750 V DC third rail
- Current collection: Collector shoe
- UIC classification: Bo′Bo′+2′2′+Bo′Bo′
- Bogies: Alstom B25
- Braking systems: Regenerative and pneumatic
- Safety systems: Alstom URBALIS 300 moving block CBTC ATC under ATO GoA 4 (UTO), with subsystems of ATP, Iconis ATS and Smartlock CBI
- Coupling system: Scharfenberg
- Track gauge: 1,435 mm (4 ft 8 1/2 in) standard gauge

The Alstom Metropolis C830 is the first generation of communication-based train control (CBTC) electric multiple unit rolling stock in operation on the Circle Line of Singapore's Mass Rapid Transit (MRT) system since 2009. Alstom was contracted in 2000 (as part of turnkey Contract 830) by the Land Transport Authority (LTA) in Singapore to supply the trains for the Circle Line.

== Operational history and overview ==
Despite being similar to the fully underground North East Line, the decision was made to power the three-car trains along the Circle Line by third rail instead of overhead catenary. 40 trainsets of three cars each were purchased for the Circle Line. For the train's tender, Alstom was awarded the contract on 28 December 2000, beating seven pre-qualified contractors.

The front of the train features an extra window cut into the emergency exit door unlike the C751A trains, giving passengers a view of the tunnel.

=== Interior ===
The interior of the C830 trains depending on the car, each car features white and grey interior walls or doors, and the shades purple, blue and green seats.

== Driverless operation ==
The C830 is fully driverless under normal circumstances, using CBTC which does not require traditional "fixed-block track circuits" for determining train position. Instead, they rely on "continuous two-way digital communication" between each controlled train and a wayside control center, which may control an area of a railway line, a complete line, or a group of lines. Recent studies consistently show that CBTC systems reduce life-cycle costs for the overall rail property and enhance operational flexibility and control.

== Train formation ==
The coupling configuration of a C830 in revenue service is Mc1–T–Mc2.

Cars of C830
Car Type	Quantity	Driver Cab	Motor	Collector Shoe	Car Length		Wheelchair Bay
Car Type	Quantity	Driver Cab	Motor	Collector Shoe	m	ft in	Wheelchair Bay
Mc	2	✓	✓	✓	23.65	77 ft 7.1 in	✗
T	1	✗	✗	✓	22.8	74 ft 9.6 in	✓

The car numbers of the trains range from 801x to 840x, where x depends on the carriage type. Individual cars are assigned a four-digit serial number by the rail operator SMRT Trains. A complete three-car trainset consists of one trailer (T) and two driving motor (Mc) cars permanently coupled together. For example, set 801 consists of carriages 8011, 8012 and 8013.

- The first digit is always an 8.
- The second and third digits identify the set number.
- The fourth digit identifies the car number, where the first car has a 1, the second has a 2 and the third has a 3.
- Alstom built sets 801 – 840.
