= Detrainment device =

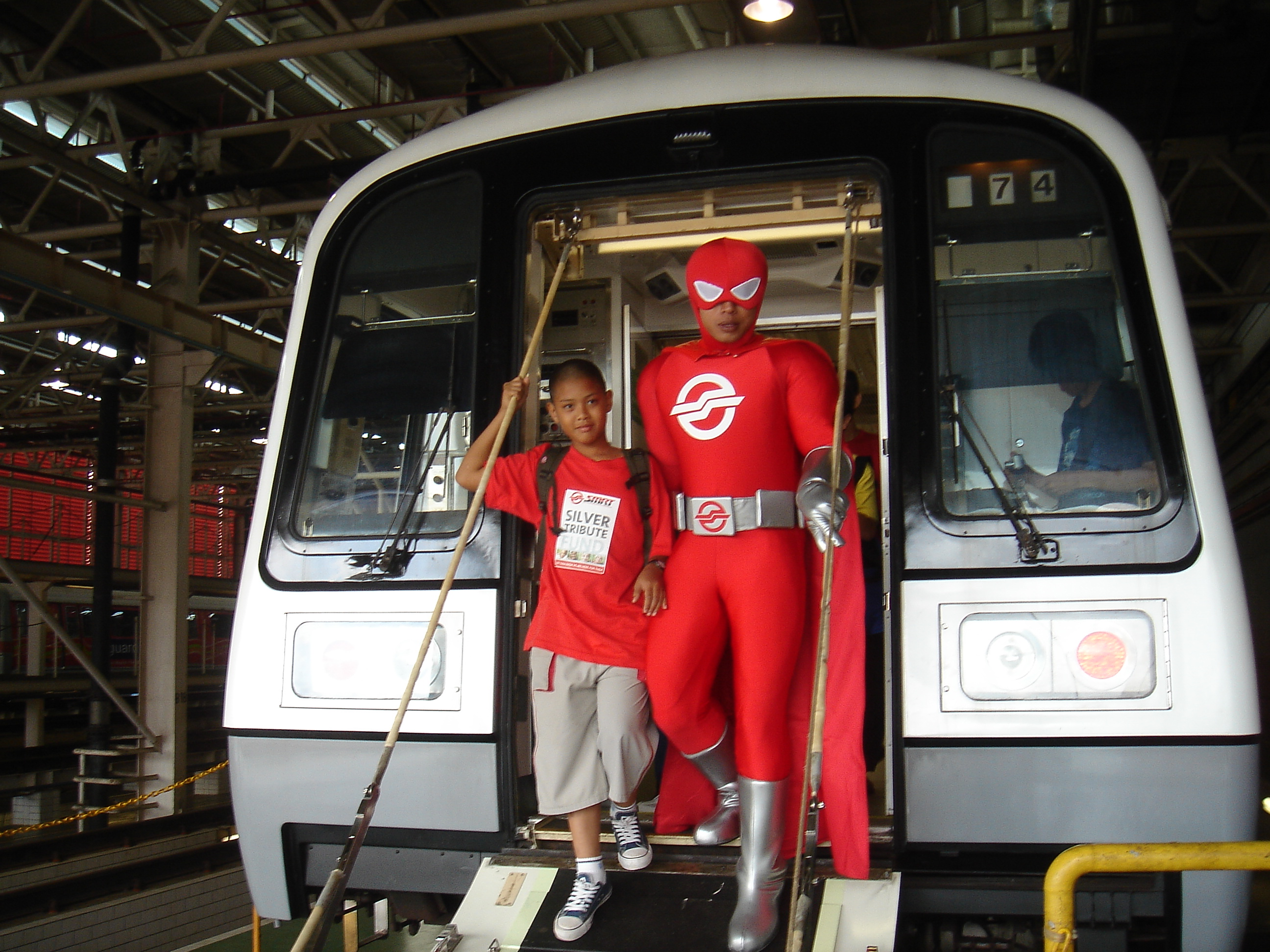
A costumed character representing SMRT Corporation demonstrates the use of emergency detrainment ramps on a refurbished Kawasaki Heavy Industries C151.

A detrainment device is equipment on a rail vehicle that provides an evacuation route for the passengers. It usually consists of a set of steps or a ramp, located at a doorway, allowing passengers to leave the vehicle in an emergency, vehicle breakdown or accident.

A detrainment device is moved from a stored location into an operational position, usually above the coupler at the end of a passenger car. A detrainment device may consist of a manually placed, hinged, foldable or telescopic ladder or ramp. A detrainment device may allow evacuation to track level, or to a coupled railcar. A detrainment device may be fitted with handrails.

In other cases, evacuation may be via the vehicle passenger side doors to a trackside walkway in a tunnel, without the use of a detrainment device.

== Types ==
Examples of the main types of detrainment device currently in service include:

=== Hinged steps, stored inside the driver's cab or the passenger saloon ===
- London Underground S Stock

=== Steps, folding, hinging or sliding out from the doorway ===
- London Underground 1973 Stock (refurbished)
- London Underground 1996 Stock
- British Rail Class 378

=== Ramp, sliding out from below the doorway ===
- London Underground 1992 Stock
- Manila Line 2 Stock

=== Ramp, folding out from the doorway ===
- Kawasaki Heavy Industries C151, Siemens C651, Kawasaki Heavy Industries & Nippon Sharyo C751B, Kawasaki Heavy Industries & CSR Sifang C151A
- Delhi Metro RS2 and RS3
- Alstom Metropolis C751A – North East Line
- Hyundai-Rotem MTR K-Stock EMU
- Kaohsiung Mass Rapid Transit

=== Tensioned Fabric ramp, deploying from the doorway ===
- MTR Corporation Airport Express A-Stock EMU
- Siemens Modular Metro and Bombardier Changchun Coaches – Bangkok BTS Skytrain
- KTM Train Coaches (even Tiger Trains)
- Bombardier MOVIA C951 - Downtown Line
- Alstom Metropolis C830 and C830C – Circle Line (Singapore)
- Alstom Metropolis C751C
- Alstom Metropolis Barcelona Metro line 9

== Performance ==
User trials on prototype equipment in controlled conditions have indicated that a wide detrainment ramp will allow the evacuation of 2500 passengers in 28 minutes if the ramp, its handrails and the cab and saloon throughways are correctly specified. Modern detrainment step systems can detrain one person every two seconds.

== See also ==
- Evacuation slide
