= Alstom Metropolis C851E =

The Alstom Metropolis C851E is a model of electric multiple unit on the Mass Rapid Transit of Singapore.

Alstom Metropolis C851E may also refer to:

- The six-car variant built for the North East Line
- The three-car variant built for the Circle Line
