= Alstom Metropolis C851E (North East Line) =

Class of electric multiple units in Singapore

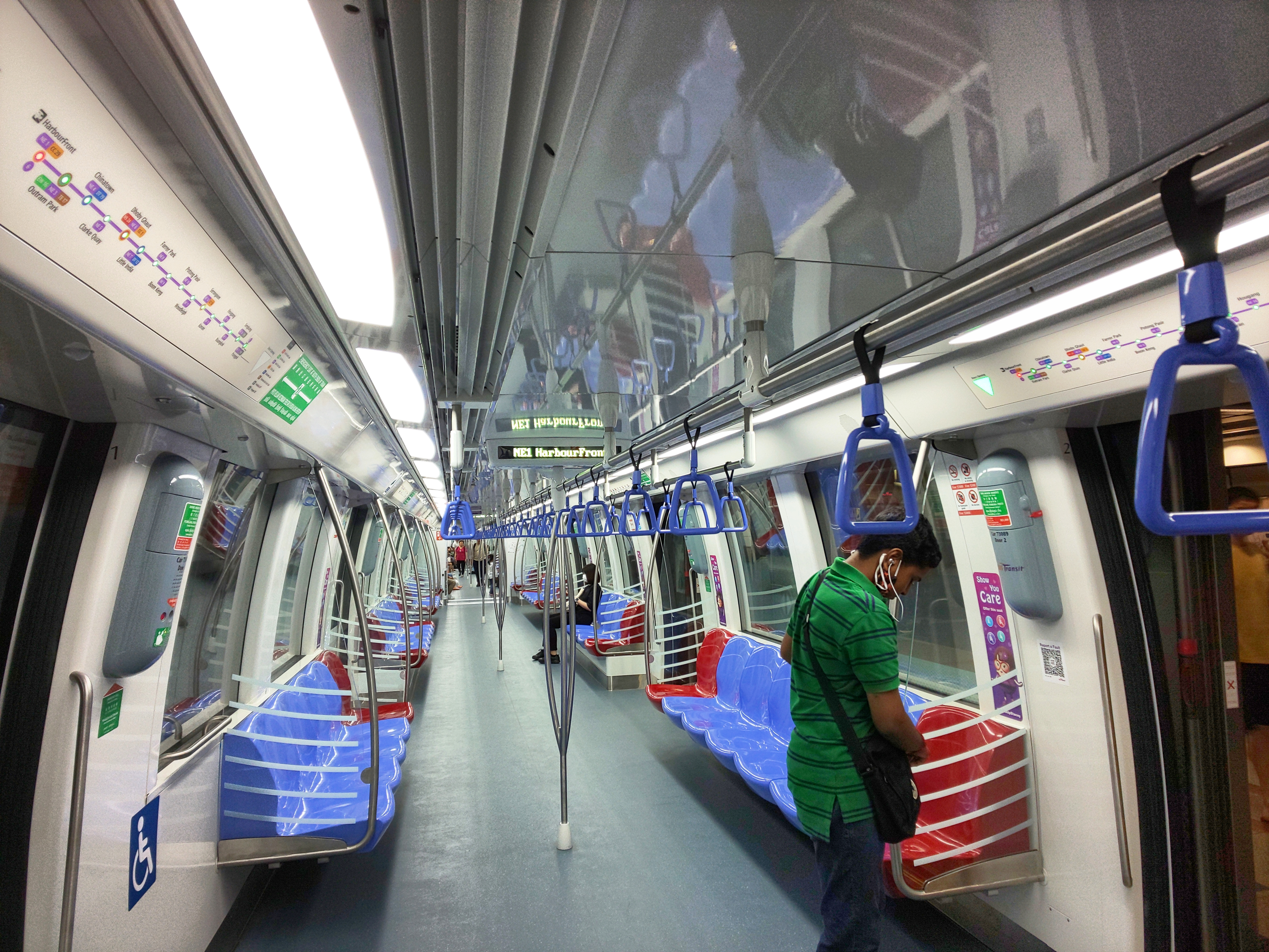
- Stock type: Electric multiple unit
- In service: 28 July 2023; 3 years ago – Present
- Manufacturer: Alstom
- Built at: Barcelona, Spain
- Family name: Metropolis
- Constructed: 2020 – 2023
- Entered service: 28 July 2023; 3 years ago
- Number built: 36 Vehicles (6 Sets)
- Number in service: 36 Vehicles (6 Sets)
- Formation: 6 cars per trainset (DT–Mp–Mi+Mi–Mp–DT)
- Fleet numbers: 7087/7088 – 7097/7098
- Capacity: 1920 passengers (298 seats)
- Operator: SBS Transit Ltd (ComfortDelGro Corporation)
- Depot: Sengkang
- Line served: North East Line

Specifications
- Car body construction: Welded aluminium
- Train length: 138.5 m (454 ft 4 3/4 in)
- Car length: 23.65 m (77 ft 7 1/8 in) (DT); 22.8 m (74 ft 9 5/8 in) (Mp/Mi)
- Width: 3.2 m (10 ft 6 in)
- Height: 3.7 m (12 ft 1 5/8 in)
- Doors: 1,450 mm (57 1/8 in), 8 per car, 4 per side
- Maximum speed: 100 km/h (62 mph) (design); 90 km/h (56 mph) (service)
- Traction system: Alstom OPTONIX IGBT–VVVF
- Acceleration: 0.95 m/s^{2} (3.1 ft/s^{2})
- Deceleration: 1.3 m/s^{2} (4.3 ft/s^{2}) (Emergency)
- Electric systems: 1,500 V DC overhead catenary
- Current collection: Pantograph
- UIC classification: 2′2′+Bo′Bo′+Bo′Bo′+Bo′Bo′+Bo′Bo′+2′2′
- Braking systems: Regenerative and pneumatic
- Safety systems: Alstom URBALIS 300 moving block CBTC ATC under ATO GoA 4 (UTO), with subsystems of ATP, Iconis ATS and Smartlock CBI
- Coupling system: Scharfenberg
- Track gauge: 1,435 mm (4 ft 8 1/2 in) standard gauge

The Alstom Metropolis C851E (North East Line) is the third generation electric multiple unit rolling stock introduced on the North East Line of Singapore's Mass Rapid Transit (MRT) system, manufactured by Alstom under Contract 851E. It consists of six six-car trains built alongside 23 three-car trains for the Circle Line. The trains were manufactured and assembled in Alstom's manufacturing facility in Barcelona, Spain and progressively shipped to Singapore from 2021. The contract, valued at around S$250 million, was awarded by the Land Transport Authority (LTA) during a ceremony held at Sengkang Depot. Alstom was the sole bidder for this contract.

== Tender ==
The tender for trains under the contract C851E was closed on 2 October 2017 with Alstom being the sole bidder for this contract. The LTA shortlisted and published the tender results.

S/N	Name of tenderer	Amount (S$) Offer 1	Amount (S$) Offer 2	Remarks
1	Alstom Transport S.A. / Alstom Transport (S) Pte Ltd Consortium	279,782,872.00	293,489,289.00	Offer 1 in mixed currencies; S$410,100,934.00 (Alternative in mixed currencies)

Contract 851E was awarded to the sole bidder, Alstom, at a cost of S$250 million on 30 April 2018.

== Overview ==
The 6 trains supplement the existing C751A and C751C trains on the North East Line for the 1.7-kilometre (1.1 mi) long extension from Punggol to Punggol Coast which opened on 10 December 2024. The first train set arrived in Singapore on 4 April 2021. On 6 June 2023, a C851E set was spotted testing at Potong Pasir MRT station for the first time. The first of these trains entered passenger service on 28 July 2023, and the last set entered service on 28 August 2023, increasing the NEL fleet from 43 to 49 trains in a span of just one month.

== Features ==
To enable a more robust maintenance regime, all the new trains are equipped with condition monitoring systems to gather data from equipment on the trains. This enables continuous monitoring of the health of the equipment and allows the operator to carry out predictive maintenance for the trains.

They are fully automated (ATO GoA 4) and do not require an attendant on board.

On the North East Line, the trains draw 1,500 V DC power from an overhead catenary. Each 6-car train (Formation: DT–Mp–Mi–Mi–Mp–DT) comprises two Driving Trailer (DT) cars at each end, and four Motor Cars (Mp and Mi). The second and fifth cars of each train (Mp) are equipped with a pantograph. The interior of the North East Line C851E remains largely consistent with its predecessor, the C751C, apart from a few subtle upgrades such as improved cabin lighting.

=== Automatic Track Inspection (ATI) ===
Two of the NEL C851E trains have their bogies installed with the Automatic Track Inspection (ATI) system, which is a system of cameras, lasers, and sensors installed on trains that help to detect defects like rail cracks or missing fasteners. The NEL trains fitted with ATI are sets 7095/7096 and 7097/7098.

== Train formation ==
The coupling configuration of a NEL C851E in revenue service is DT–Mp–Mi+Mi–Mp–DT.

Cars of C851E (North East Line)
Car Type	Driver Cab	Motor	Pantograph	Car Length		Wheelchair Bay
Car Type	Driver Cab	Motor	Pantograph	m	ft in	Wheelchair Bay
DT	✓	✗		23.65	77 ft 7.1 in	✗
Mp	✗	✓	✓	22.8	74 ft 9.6 in	✗
Mi	✗	✓	✗	22.8	74 ft 9.6 in	✓

The car numbers of the trains range from 7x087 to 7x098, where x depends on the carriage type. Individual cars are assigned a five-digit serial number by the rail operator SBS Transit. A complete six-car trainset consists of an identical twin set of one driving trailer (DT) and two motor cars (Mi & Mp) permanently coupled together. For example, set 7097/7098 consists of carriages 71097, 72097, 73097, 73098, 72098 and 71098.

- The first digit identifies the line, which is always a 7.
- The second digit identifies the car number, where the first car has a 1, the second has a 2 & the third has a 3.
- The third digit is always a 0.
- The fourth and fifth digits identify the set number.
- Alstom built sets 7087/7088 – 7097/7098.

== See also ==
- Alstom Metropolis C851E (Circle Line)
- Alstom Metropolis C751A
- Alstom Metropolis C751C
