= Singapore Mass Rapid Transit =

Singapore Mass Rapid Transit may refer to:

- Mass Rapid Transit (Singapore), the Mass Rapid Transit system in Singapore
- SBS Transit, the company that operates the North East Line, Downtown Line and the Sengkang and Punggol LRT of Singapore's Mass Rapid Transit system
- SMRT Corporation, the company that operates the East–West Line, North–South Line, Circle Line and the Bukit Panjang LRT of Singapore's Mass Rapid Transit system
