= Alstom Metropolis C751A =

Class of electric multiple units in Singapore

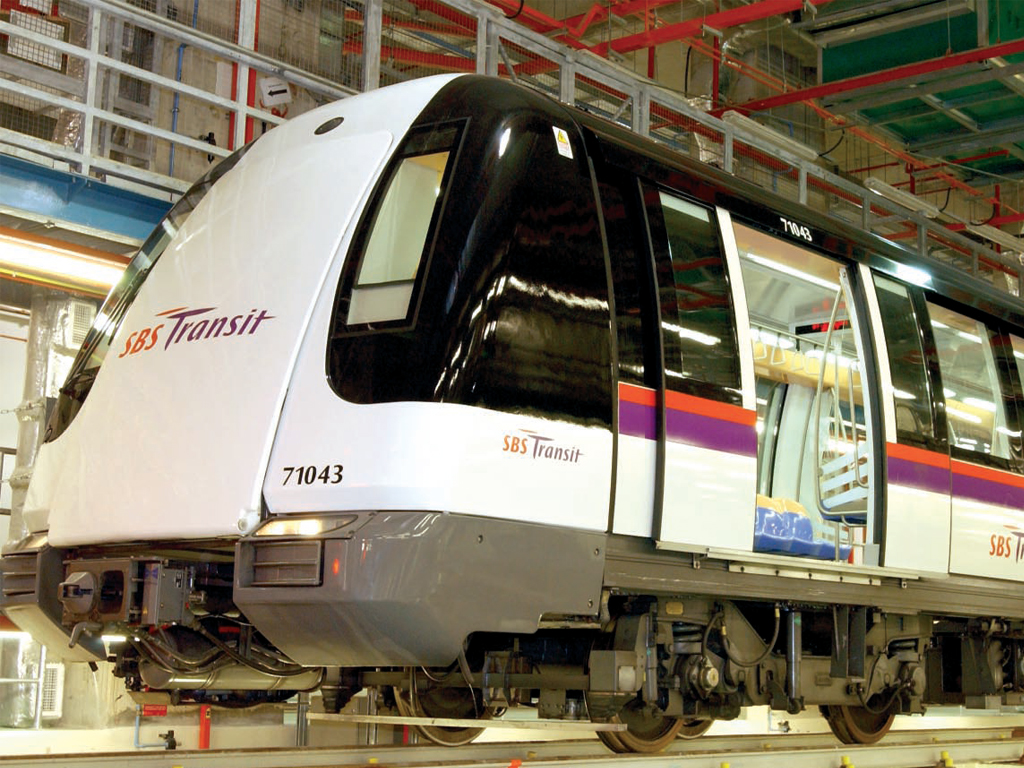
- Front of an Alstom Metropolis C751A at Sengkang Depot. Trains running on this line are driverless and fully automated.

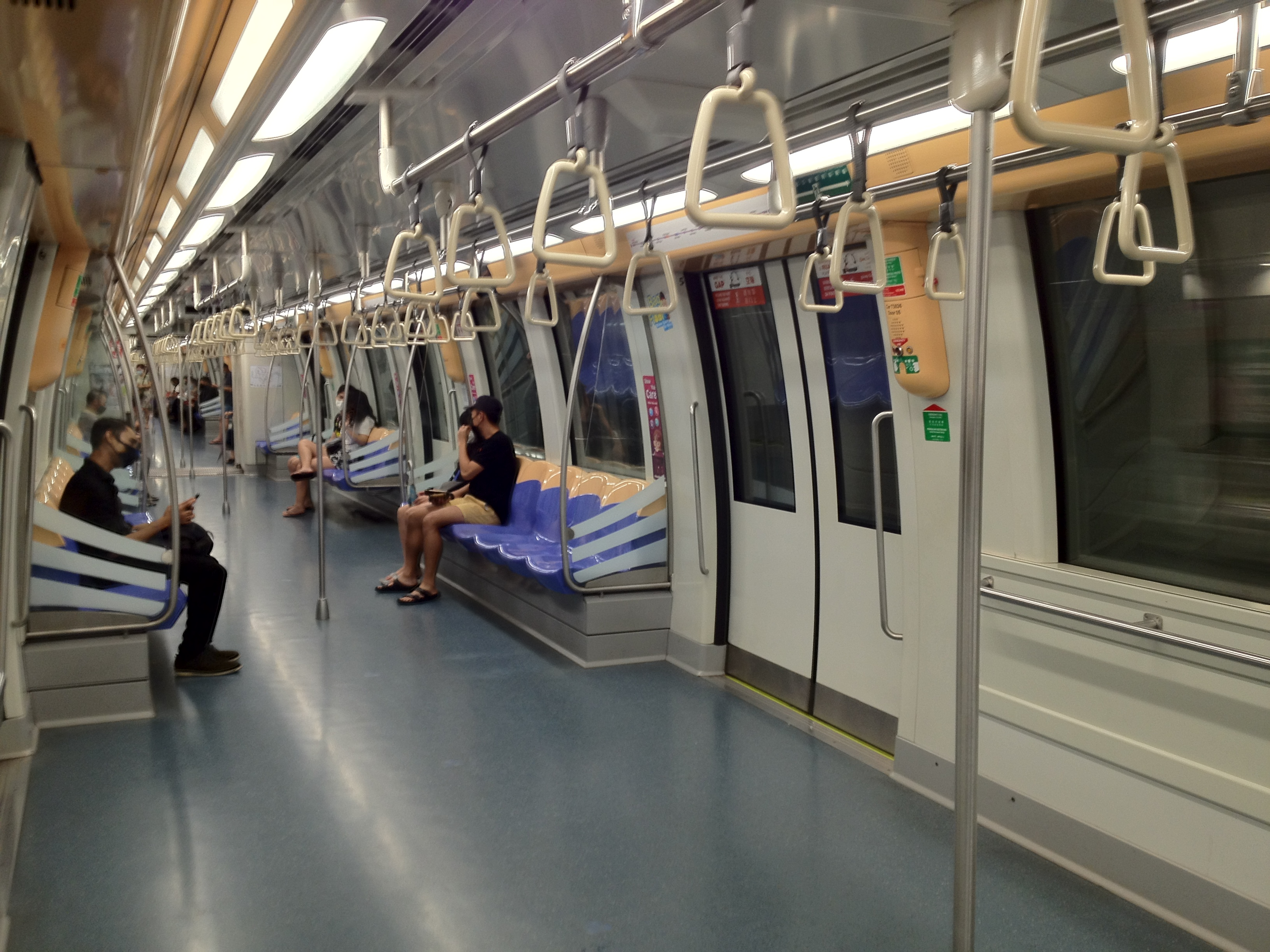
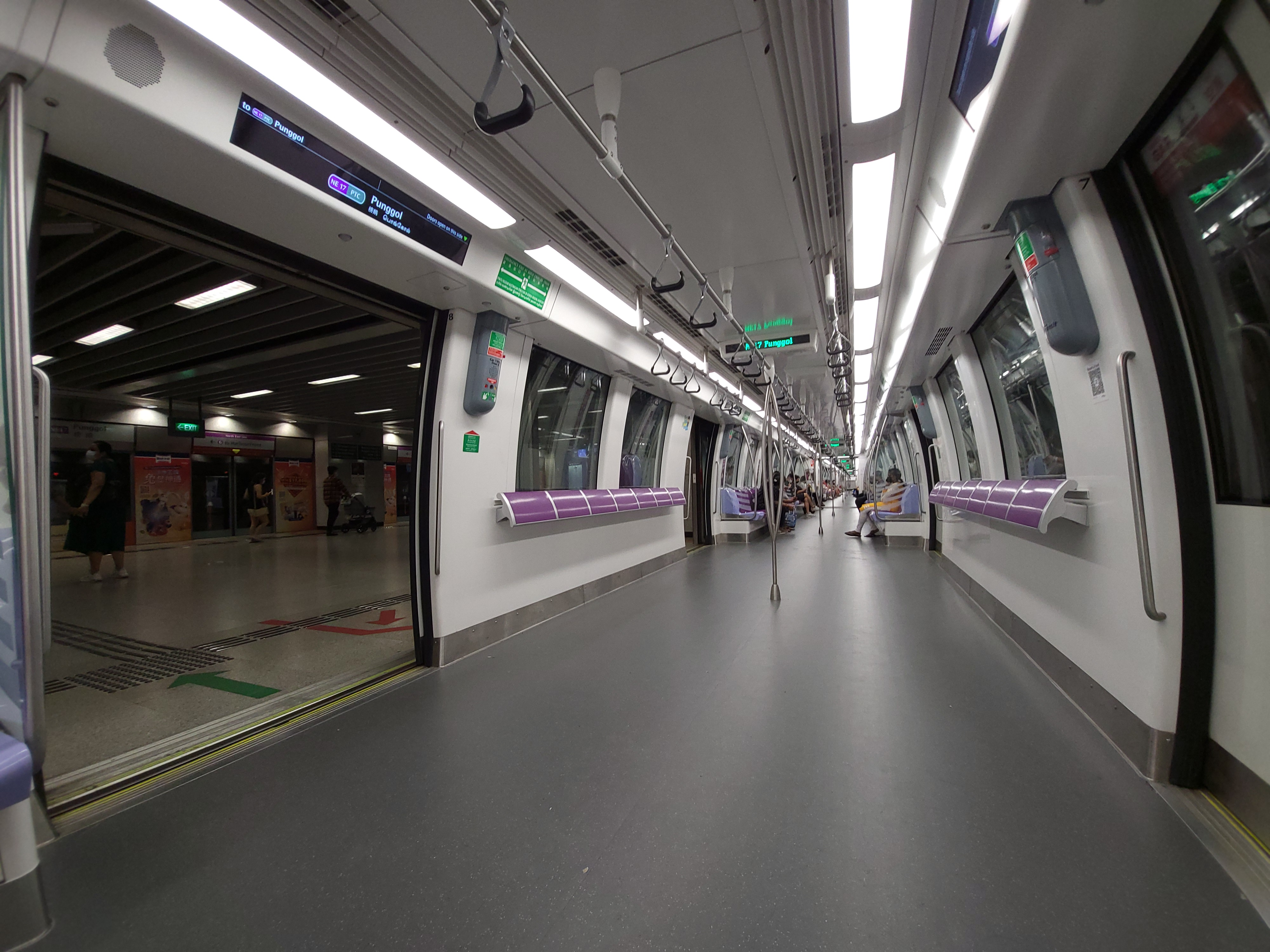
- Interior of a Alstom Metropolis C751A before refurbishment Interior of a refurbished Alstom Metropolis C751A.
- Stock type: Electric multiple unit
- In service: 20 June 2003; 23 years ago – Present
- Manufacturer: Alstom
- Built at: Valenciennes, France
- Family name: Metropolis
- Constructed: 2000 – 2003
- Entered service: 20 June 2003; 23 years ago
- Refurbished: CRRC Nanjing Puzhen; 2019 – 2026
- Number built: 150 Vehicles (25 sets)
- Number in service: 150 Vehicles (25 sets)
- Formation: 6 per trainset DT–Mp–Mi+Mi–Mp–DT
- Fleet numbers: 7001/7002 – 7049/7050
- Capacity: 1920 passengers (298 seats)
- Operator: SBS Transit
- Depot: Sengkang
- Line served: North East Line

Specifications
- Car body construction: Welded aluminium
- Train length: 138.5 m (454 ft 4 3/4 in) (with 6 Cars)
- Car length: 23.65 m (77 ft 7 1/8 in) (DT); 22.8 m (74 ft 9 5/8 in) (Mp/Mi)
- Width: 3.2 m (10 ft 6 in)
- Height: 3.7 m (12 ft 1 5/8 in)
- Floor height: 1,100 mm (3 ft 7 1/4 in)
- Doors: 1,450 mm (57 1/8 in), 8 per car, 4 per side
- Wheel diameter: 850–775 mm (33.5–30.5 in)
- Wheelbase: 2.5 m (8 ft 2 in)
- Maximum speed: 100 km/h (62 mph) (design); 90 km/h (56 mph) (service)
- Weight: 230 t (230 long tons; 250 short tons) (6 passengers/1 m^{2} or 11 sq ft)
- Axle load: 16 t (16 long tons; 18 short tons)
- Traction system: Alstom ONIX 1500 IGBT–VVVF
- Traction motors: 16 × Alstom 4LCA 2138 150 kW (200 hp) asynchronous 3-phase AC
- Power output: 2.4 MW (3,200 hp)
- Acceleration: 1.1 m/s^{2} (2.5 mph/s)
- Deceleration: 1.3 m/s^{2} (2.9 mph/s) (Emergency)
- Electric systems: 1,500 V DC overhead catenary
- Current collection: Pantograph
- UIC classification: 2′2′+Bo′Bo′+Bo′Bo′+Bo′Bo′+Bo′Bo′+2′2′
- Bogies: Alstom B25
- Braking systems: Regenerative and pneumatic
- Safety systems: Alstom URBALIS 300 moving block CBTC ATC under ATO GoA 4 (UTO), with subsystems of ATP, Iconis ATS and Smartlock CBI
- Coupling system: Scharfenberg coupler
- Track gauge: 1,435 mm (4 ft 8 1/2 in) standard gauge

The Alstom Metropolis C751A is the first generation of communications-based train control (CBTC) electric multiple unit rolling stock in operation on the North East Line (NEL) of Singapore's Mass Rapid Transit (MRT) system since 2003. 25 trainsets were purchased for the line.

== Operational history and overview ==
In February 1997, the Land Transport Authority (LTA) of Singapore shortlisted several rolling stock companies for the bidding of the trains. In January 1998, GEC Alsthom (now known as Alstom) secured a contract to supply rolling stock for the NEL. The contract was for 25 trains, each consisting of six cars, under Contract 751A. The trains were part of the Metropolis family of the urban EMU trains. Unlike all other MRT lines, it draws power from the 1,500 V DC overhead catenary.

Also, the C751A was the first MRT rolling stock to have seats of the same color in every carriage and is also the first fully driverless rolling stock in Singapore. Nevertheless, SBS Transit hires rover employees to drive trains manually if needed. For Alstom, it uses the URBALIS 300 moving-block communications-based (CBTC) Automatic Train Control (ATC) system, which optimizes headway and enables extra trains to be injected automatically into the system at rush hour to increase passenger capacity and reduce congestion. In the depot, trains are also operated in fully automatic mode. Communication between the train and the fixed signaling equipment is enabled by the IAGO two-way continuous transmission system. Station-based automatic train supervision ensures a greater degree of availability. Built-in test equipment has also been included, and Eurobalise standards have been adopted for spot transmission.

=== Refurbishment ===
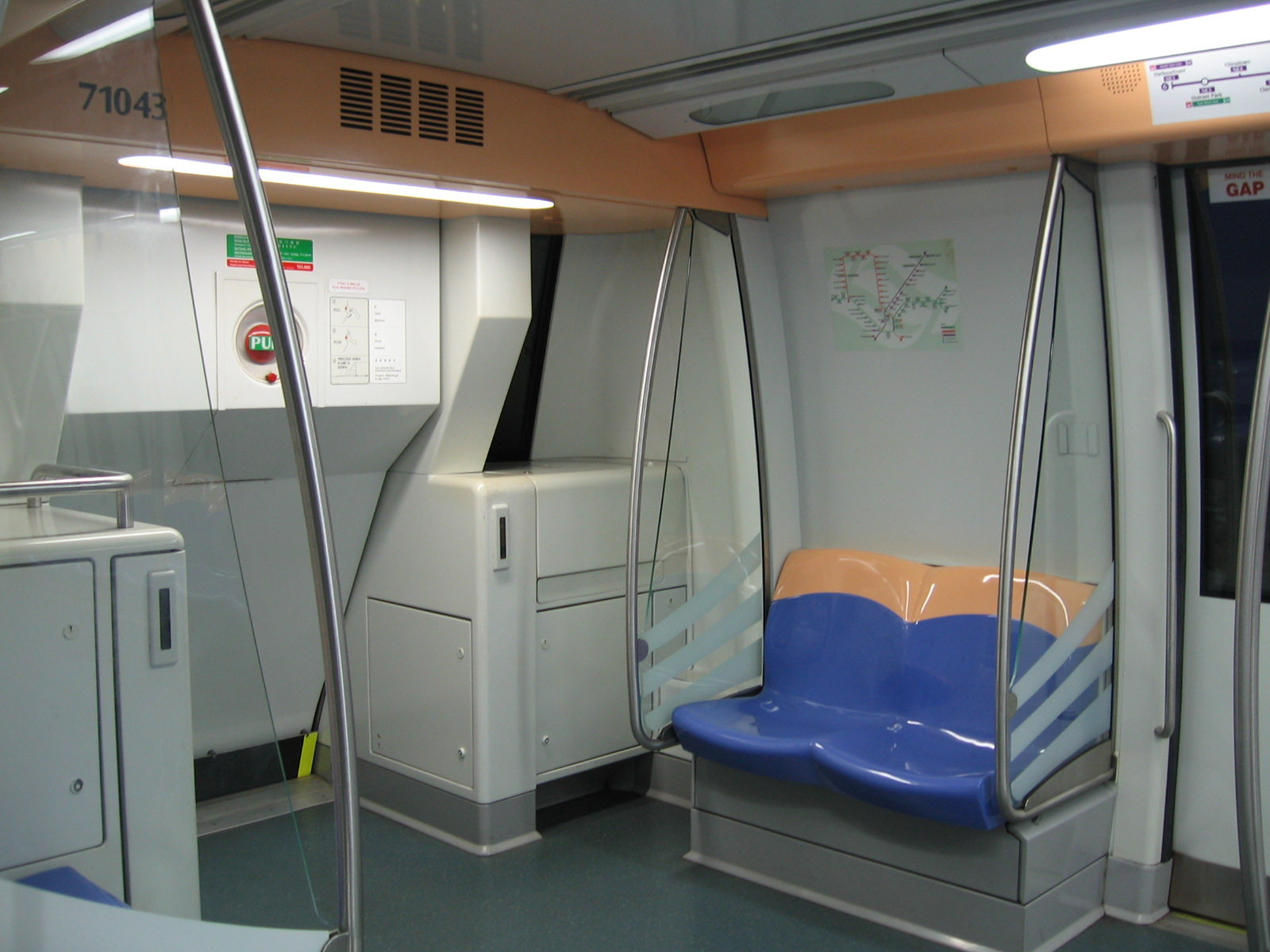
The fully automated operation of the North East Line trains allows for passengers to view the tracks on each end of the trainset

In December 2018, LTA announced that the C751A trains will undergo mid-life refurbishment works from 2019 onwards. A contract worth $116.7 million was awarded to CRRC Nanjing Puzhen for the refurbishment works. All 25 first-generation C751A trains will be upgraded. The part of these trains interior, such as new seats, panels & flooring were everything materials. The current 6 LCD screens on the side panels (which former showed rail travel information of the next station and terminating station, silent commercials, and safety videos) above some seats had already been deactivated & were removed in refurbished trains. However, a new LTA's LCD Dynamic Route Map Display (DRMD) located above each door will be retrofitted. These Dynamic Route Map Display (DRMD) sets will be similar to those found on newer MRT trains such as the Kawasaki Heavy Industries & CRRC Qingdao Sifang T251 and Alstom Movia R151 trainsets. In addition, the air-conditioning and ventilation systems will be upgraded.

The exterior livery design will be retained with the exception of Land Transport Authority logos. Smaller SBS Transit logos are located on the gangway ends of each car in a similar fashion to LTA's earlier corporate livery designs.

The first refurbished train set (7013/7014) re-entered passenger service on 28 February 2022, with all 25 trains having completed its refurbishment works as of 23 February 2026.
