= North East Line =

Mass Rapid Transit line in Singapore

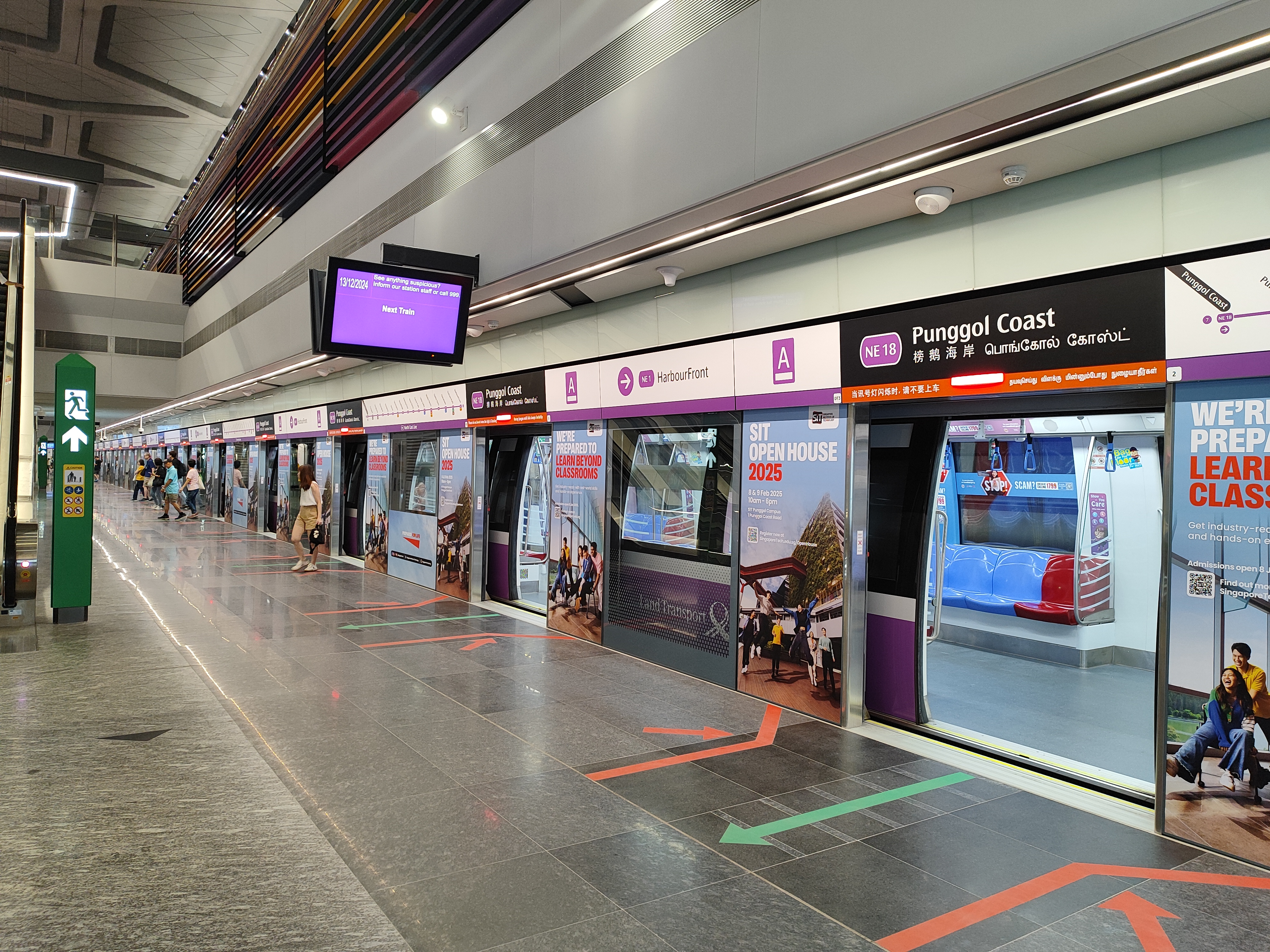
- An Alstom Metropolis C851E train at Punggol Coast station, the NEL's northern terminus

Overview
- Native name: Malay: Laluan MRT Timur Laut; Chinese: 东北地铁线; Tamil: வடகிழக்கு ரயில் பாதை
- Status: Operational
- Owner: Land Transport Authority
- Locale: Singapore
- Termini: HarbourFront; Punggol Coast
- Stations: 17 (Note: A future station, between HarbourFront and Outram Park, may be possible.)
- Color on map: Purple (#9900aa)

Service
- Type: Rapid transit
- System: Mass Rapid Transit (Singapore)
- Services: 2
- Operator: SBS Transit (ComfortDelGro)
- Depot: Sengkang
- Rolling stock: Alstom Metropolis C751A; Alstom Metropolis C751C; Alstom Metropolis C851E
- Daily ridership: 602,000<

History
- Opened: 20 June 2003; 23 years ago 15 January 2006; 20 years ago (Buangkok); 20 June 2011; 15 years ago (Woodleigh); 10 December 2024; 23 months ago (Punggol Coast)

Technical
- Line length: 21.6 km (13.4 mi)
- Character: Fully underground
- Track gauge: 1,435 mm (4 ft 8 1/2 in) standard gauge
- Electrification: 1,500 V DC overhead catenary (Note: HarbourFront to Punggol); 1,500 V DC overhead conductor rail (Note: Punggol Coast)
- Operating speed: limit of 90 km/h (56 mph)

The North East Line (NEL) is a high-capacity Mass Rapid Transit (MRT) line in Singapore. Operated by SBS Transit, the 22-kilometre (14-mile) line is the MRT's shortest. (Note: Line lengths of other operational lines: The North–South Line at 45 km (28 mi); East–West Line at 57.2 km (35.5 mi); Circle Line at 35 km (22 mi); Downtown Line at 42 km (26 mi); Thomson–East Coast Line at 40.6 km (25.2 mi).) It runs from HarbourFront station in southern Singapore to Punggol Coast station in the northeast, serving 17 stations via Chinatown, Little India, Serangoon and Hougang. Coloured purple on official maps, it is Singapore's third MRT line and the world's first fully-automated underground driverless heavy rail line.

The NEL was planned during the 1980s to alleviate traffic congestion on roads leading to the northeastern suburbs of the country. However, the project was delayed due to a lack of demand at that time. After the government decided to proceed with the project at an estimated cost of S$5 billion, its alignment and stations were finalised in 1996 and construction began the year after. The line began operations on 20 June 2003. Two mid-line stations did not open with the rest of the line; Buangkok station opened on 15 January 2006, and Woodleigh station began operations on 20 June 2011. A one-station extension to Punggol Coast station opened on 10 December 2024.

The driverless line uses the moving-block Alstom Urbalis 300 CBTC signalling system. Three types of Alstom rolling stock – C751A, C751C and C851E – run on the NEL, which is powered by an overhead line. The NEL is Singapore's first Art-in-Transit line, with 19 artworks displayed across its 17 stations. The stations are wheelchair-accessible, and most of them are civil defence shelters designed to withstand airstrikes and chemical attacks.

== History ==
=== Planning ===
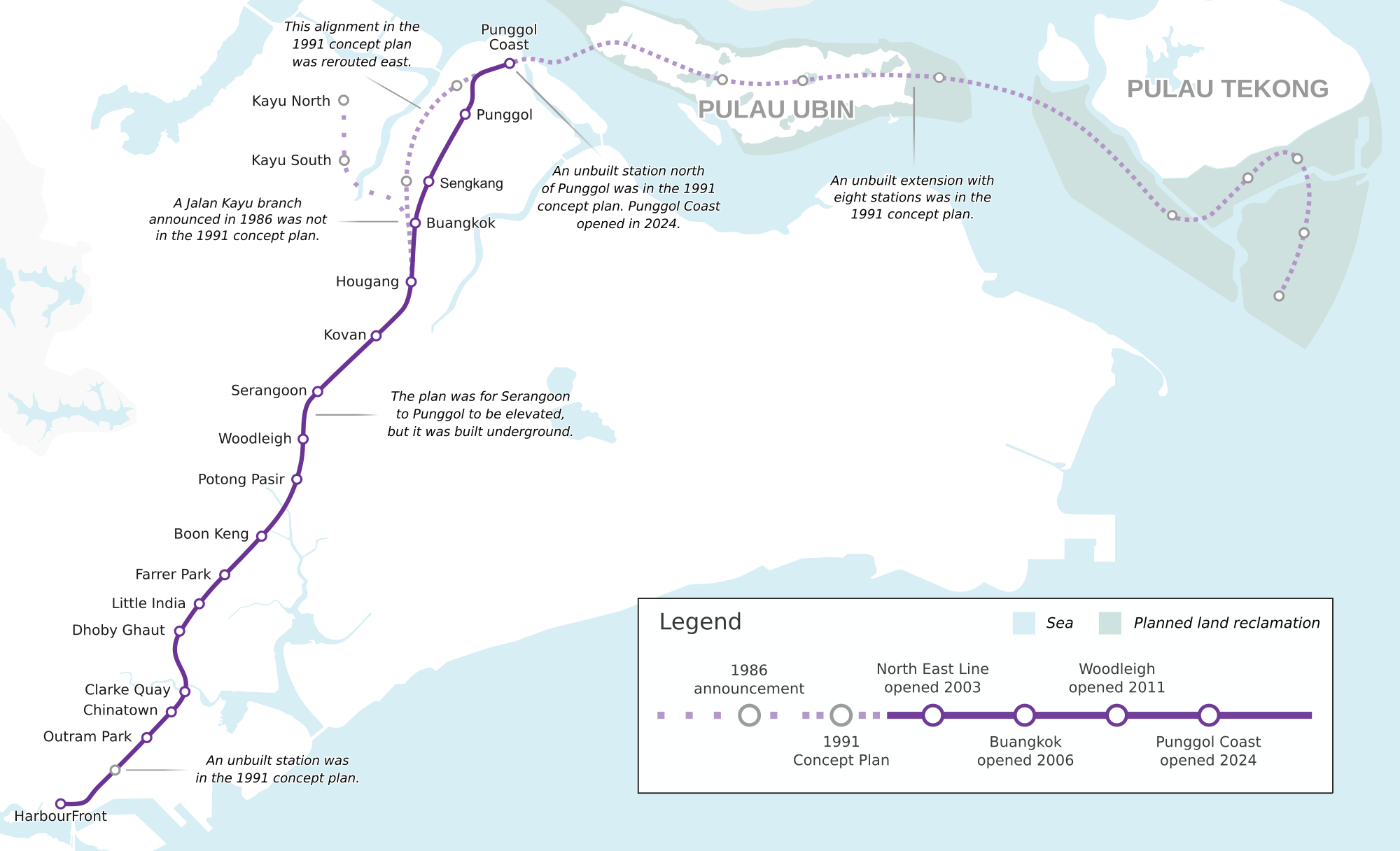
Planning map for the line

The Mass Rapid Transit Corporation (MRTC) first proposed an additional MRT line serving the northeastern areas of Punggol and Jalan Kayu in September 1984. In its preliminary studies, the Communications Ministry concluded that existing roads would be inadequate for projected traffic into housing estates set to be built in the 21st century. To minimise the impact on other development, the Ministry developed plans to determine which parcels of land would be needed for the new MRT project. In December of that year, a British consultancy team consisting of Sir William Halcrow and Partners, Merz & McLellan and London Transport International was appointed by the MRTC to look into possible routes for the line.

In March 1986, the British consultants drew up a tentative route from Outram Park to Punggol. The line would connect to the existing MRT system at Dhoby Ghaut station and pass through Kandang Kerbau and Hougang, paralleling the major Serangoon and Upper Serangoon Roads. A branch line from Hougang to Jalan Kayu was also proposed. The segment of the line in the city would be underground, and the northern portion after Braddell Road would be elevated.

The MRTC, which approved the project in October 1986, proposed that the line link to Bishan Depot (which would maintain and service its trains). In February 1991, a proposal was made to extend the line to Pulau Tekong via Pulau Ubin to serve future residential and industrial developments in the long-term plans for these islands.

=== Delay ===
Although the government approved the NEL "in principle" in January 1989, Communications Minister Yeo Ning Hong said that the line's construction was dependent on development in the northeast. The Woodlands extension, (Note: The North–South Line, from Yew Tee to Sembawang.) which cost S$1.35 billion (US$0.7 billion), took precedence over the S$4.3 billion (US$2.4 billion) NEL. According to Yeo's successor, Mah Bow Tan, there were firmer plans for development around the Woodlands extension, unlike in the northeast, where the low population meant that the NEL would not be as cost-effective. The four Members of Parliament (MPs) for the northeast called for the line to be built sooner, saying that there would be sufficient demand (given the area's population) and it would relieve traffic congestion.

Reviewing the line's feasibility, the Communications Ministry said in 1995 that the NEL could be completed in 2002 if construction began promptly. It was projected to cost S$5 billion (US$3.5 billion) and would operate at a loss of S$250 million (US$176.4 million) during its first four years, with lower daily passenger numbers (240,000). The ministry recommended the construction of the NEL to the Cabinet, citing "wider benefits" such as reduced travelling time and reliance on cars.

There's no question about our desire or willingness to bring this extension forward. I believe it's worth the effort. It's worth doing. I believe residents will show their commitment and willingness to help us bring the gap in operating costs.

— Mah Bow Tan, engaging with grassroots leaders at the Punggol Community Club on 22 October 1995

Mah, engaging with grassroots leaders in October 1995, said that residents would have to be prepared to pay higher fares on the NEL to cover the line's cost and initial losses. His position was divisive; some leaders felt that it would be unfair to the residents, and others were confident that residents would be willing "to pay for a better quality of life". Increased fares for the entire network were also suggested, but Mah said that it would be more difficult to implement. He assured leaders that he would recommend construction of the line to the government.

A white paper released on 2 January 1996 said that the NEL would be built earlier to address congestion in the northeast corridor, which would also be relieved by express bus service. The government's announcement during a 19 January parliamentary debate on the report that it had decided to build the NEL "immediately" was greeted with applause.

=== Construction and opening ===
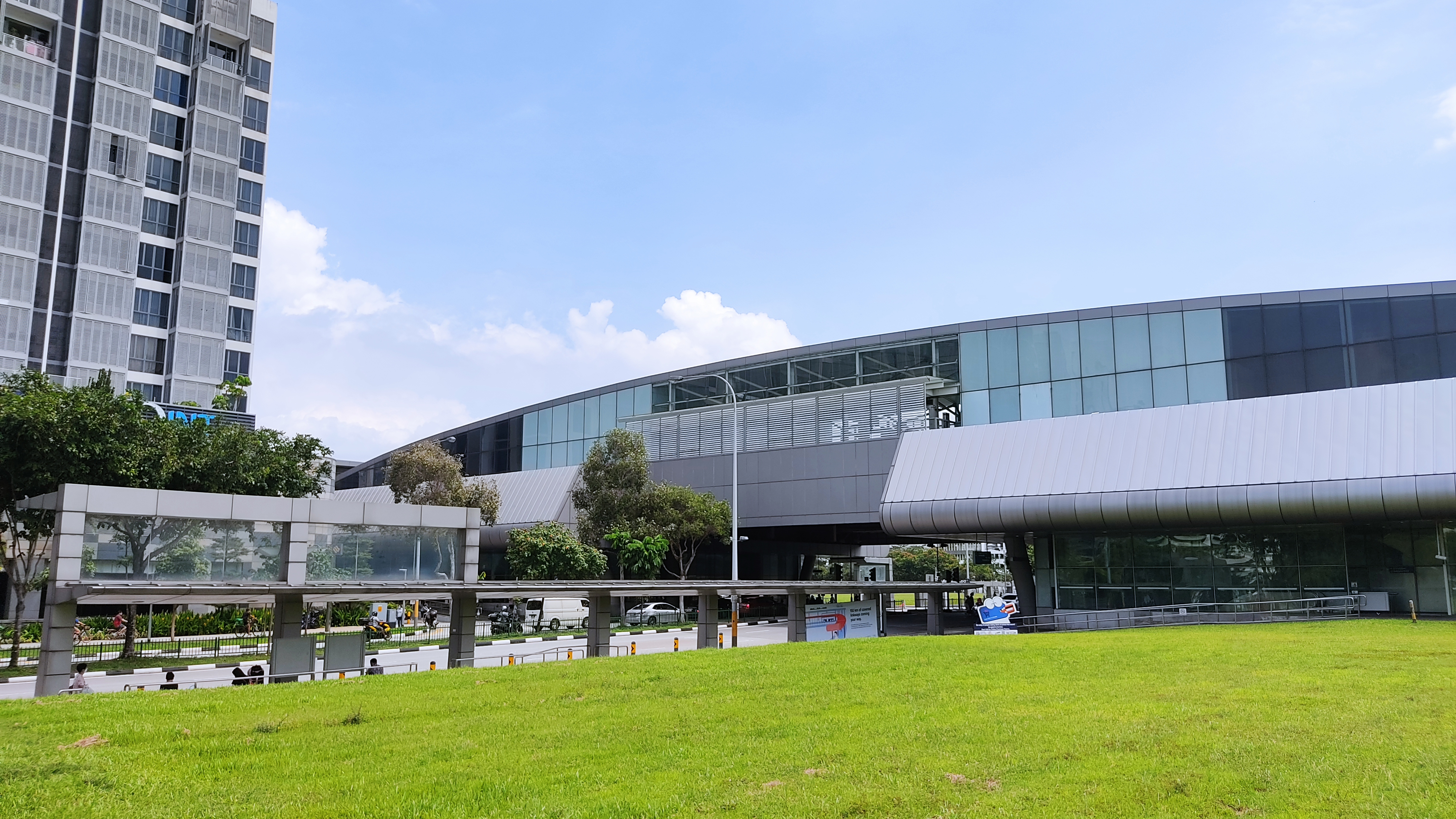
The Punggol station's construction was expedited to serve the area's new developments.

North East Line stations timeline
Date	Project	Description
20 June 2003	North East Line	HarbourFront – Punggol (14 stations)
15 January 2006	North East Line	Opening of Buangkok station
20 June 2011	North East Line	Opening of Woodleigh station
10 December 2024	North East Line Extension	Punggol – Punggol Coast (1 station)

The 16 NEL stations and their locations were announced on 4 March 1996. Many residents and politicians welcomed the announcement, since the line was expected to relieve traffic congestion, improve transport in the northeast and stimulate development around the stations. Thirteen civil contracts for track work and construction of the stations, Sengkang Depot and associated tunnels were awarded for a total of S$2.8 billion (US$1.9 billion). Sixteen more contracts related to electrical and mechanical work were awarded for a total of S$1 billion (US$3.5 billion).

To construct the line, 20 ha (49 acres) of private land was acquired and 43 ha (110 acres) of government land was returned to the state. Several rental HDB blocks, private homes and shops were acquired, dismaying many affected residents. Those who had been asked to relocate in July 1996 requested more time to find new premises.

Construction of the line began with a groundbreaking ceremony at Farrer Park station on 25 November 1997. On 20 May 1999, SBS Transit (then Singapore Bus Service) was appointed to operate the line along with the Sengkang and Punggol LRT system. Parsons Brinckerhoff (through PB Merz and McLellan; now WSJ USA) was appointed to be the consultant for the line's engineering and design.

Construction challenges on the line included diverting the Eu Tong Seng canal for construction of the Chinatown station, and avoiding flooding the tunnels and stations while boring tunnels under the Singapore River between the Clarke Quay and Dhoby Ghaut stations. At the Outram Park station, an arched roof of cement-filled steel pipes was laid underneath the EWL tunnels to minimise movement. Jet-grout arches were used to support the North–South Line (NSL) tunnels when explosives were used to remove rock while tunnelling from Clarke Quay to Dhoby Ghaut. Roads around the line had to be temporarily diverted for construction.

When the 16 stations were announced, Potong Pasir (then named Sennett), Woodleigh and Punggol were planned to be built as shell stations due to lack of development around the station sites. It was later decided to build these stations in full as it would have been more costly to wait until later to complete the stations from the structural shells. In 1998, the timeline for Punggol station was moved up because of planned housing developments in the area. The decision not to build Sennett station generated political controversy, however, with claims by residents and opposition MP Chiam See Tong that the station would only open if the ruling People's Action Party (PAP) secured the constituency. In 2002, after a revised ridership study, the government decided to open the station with the other NEL stations due to projected developments around the site; the station also received its present name.

The NEL was initially expected to be completed by the end of 2002, with SBS staff trained in train maintenance and other technical aspects of the automated system. However, the Land Transport Authority (LTA) said in September 2002 that the line might be opened in April 2003 to allow sufficient time for testing. The line's systems were handed over to SBS Transit on 16 December, and the operator conducted further tests. The NEL's opening was delayed until June due to a glitch in the signalling system, however, with tests briefly handed over to the LTA. Since it had to bear the costs of maintenance and manpower, SBS Transit sought compensation from the government for the delay.

Except for two stations (Buangkok and Woodleigh), the NEL began operations on 20 June 2003. About 140,000 people rode the line on its opening day. Prime Minister Goh Chok Tong visited the NEL on 28 June 2003 and travelled between Sengkang and Chinatown stations. The line's opening ceremony was held on 28 August by Deputy Prime Minister Lee Hsien Loong. Although the NEL has experienced a few glitches since its opening, it has been reliable and generally well-received by commuters. The International Association of Public Transport called the NEL a model public-transport system for the future in July 2003, with other driverless systems planned around the world. SBS Transit reported in June 2004 that the line averaged one 15-minute delay every six weeks, compared to expected twice-a-week delays. Average daily ridership has risen to 174,000 in 2004, with highest at 268,000 during Lunar New Year celebrations on 3 January that year.

=== Opening of reserved stations ===
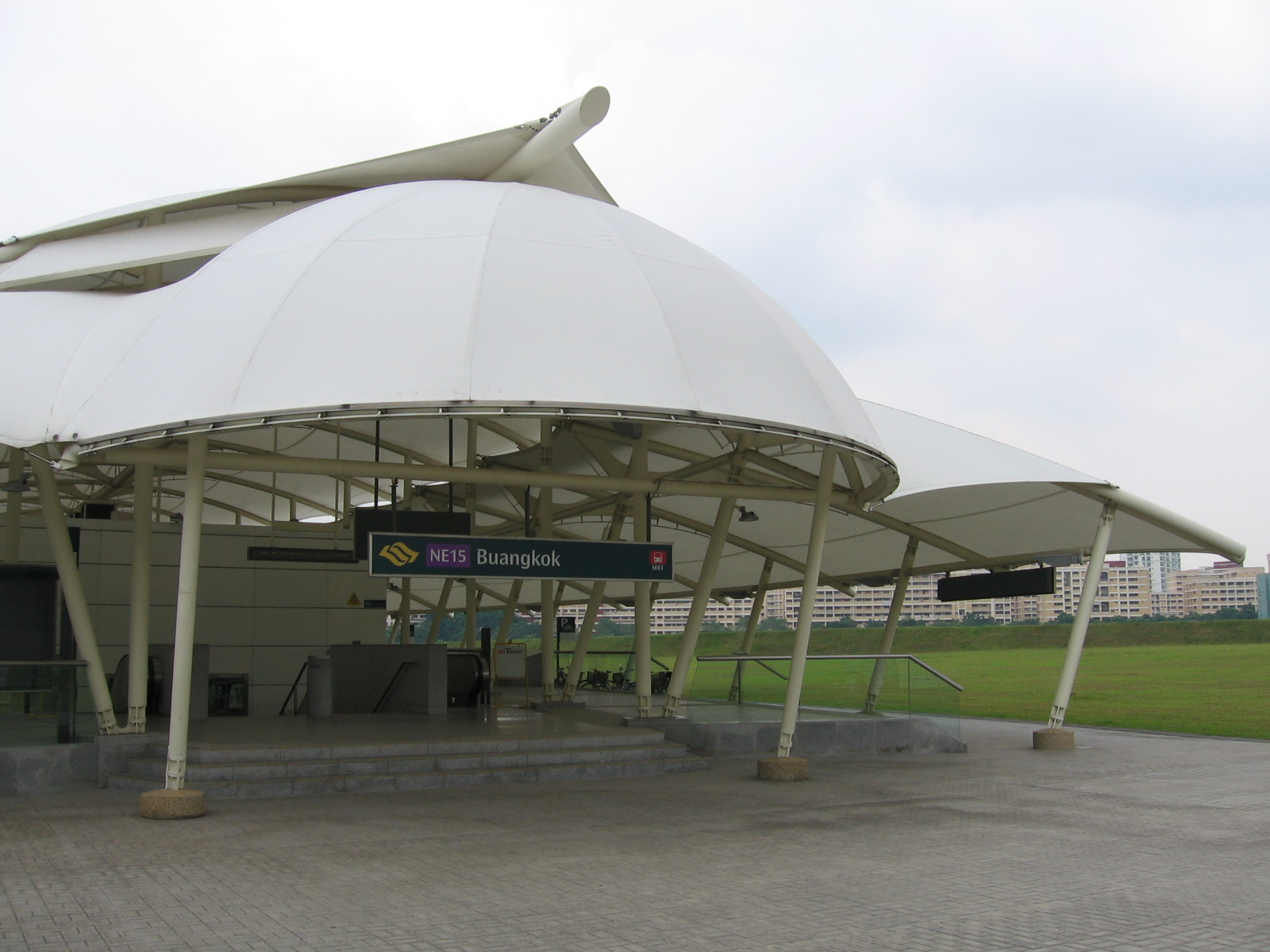
An entrance to Buangkok MRT station in August 2006, shortly after its opening

On 17 June 2003, SBS Transit announced that the Woodleigh and Buangkok stations would not open with the other NEL stations. Due to the lack of development, the operator said keeping the stations closed would reduce operating costs by S$2–3 million. At the time, housing demand declined due to the 1997 Asian financial crisis and the economic downturn following the September 11 attacks. Consequently, the Housing and Development Board cut back on its development plans in the Singapore northeast area. Residents around the line were upset by the sudden decision to keep Buangkok station closed, since they had been assured by MPs and grassroots leaders that it would be opened.

The government initially stood by SBS Transit's decision to keep the station closed, planning to open it in 2006 when more residential flats would be in the area. The opening was further postponed to 2008, following projected housing-development plans for the area. In August 2005, during a visit by youth minister Vivian Balakrishnan to Punggol South, eight white cardboard elephants were put up in protest; a grassroots leader was sternly warned after a police investigation into the incident. Following another evaluation by the LTA, SBS Transit announced at the end of 2005 that the station would be opened on 15 January 2006.

The Buangkok station opened as scheduled "with much fanfare". Since its opening, however, the station averaged only 1,386 daily riders instead of the expected 6,000. Many residents still travelled to the adjacent Sengkang and Hougang stations due to their amenities. SBS Transit, after saying that it was still "too early to draw a conclusion" about ridership, remained committed to keeping the station open to serve future developments nearby.

Despite early predictions that that the NEL would incur heavy losses for SBS Transit, the line became profitable in its third year of operations. Average daily ridership more than doubled from 156,000 in 2003 to 380,000 by 2009. Gan Juay Kiat, executive director of SBS Transit, attributed the growth to rapid housing development in Sengkang and Punggol. Charles Chong, the Member of Parliament for Pasir Ris–Punggol who had lobbied for Buangkok's station earlier opening, argued that the line itself had attracted residents to the new towns. By then, Buangkok station's daily ridership had also risen to 7,000.

Woodleigh station, built near the former Bidadari cemetery, was scheduled to open seven or eight years after the rest of the line. In January 2011, The Straits Times reported that preparations for the station's opening had been ongoing since the second half of 2010; the newspaper speculated that the station would open in mid-2011 to serve new developments in the area. In a March parliamentary session, Transport Minister Raymond Lim confirmed that the station would open on 20 June 2011. SBS deployed several staff members to assist confused commuters who alighted at Woodleigh station instead of the adjacent Serangoon station. Others alighted to view the station's interior or try an alternative route from the station.

=== North East Line extension (NELe) ===
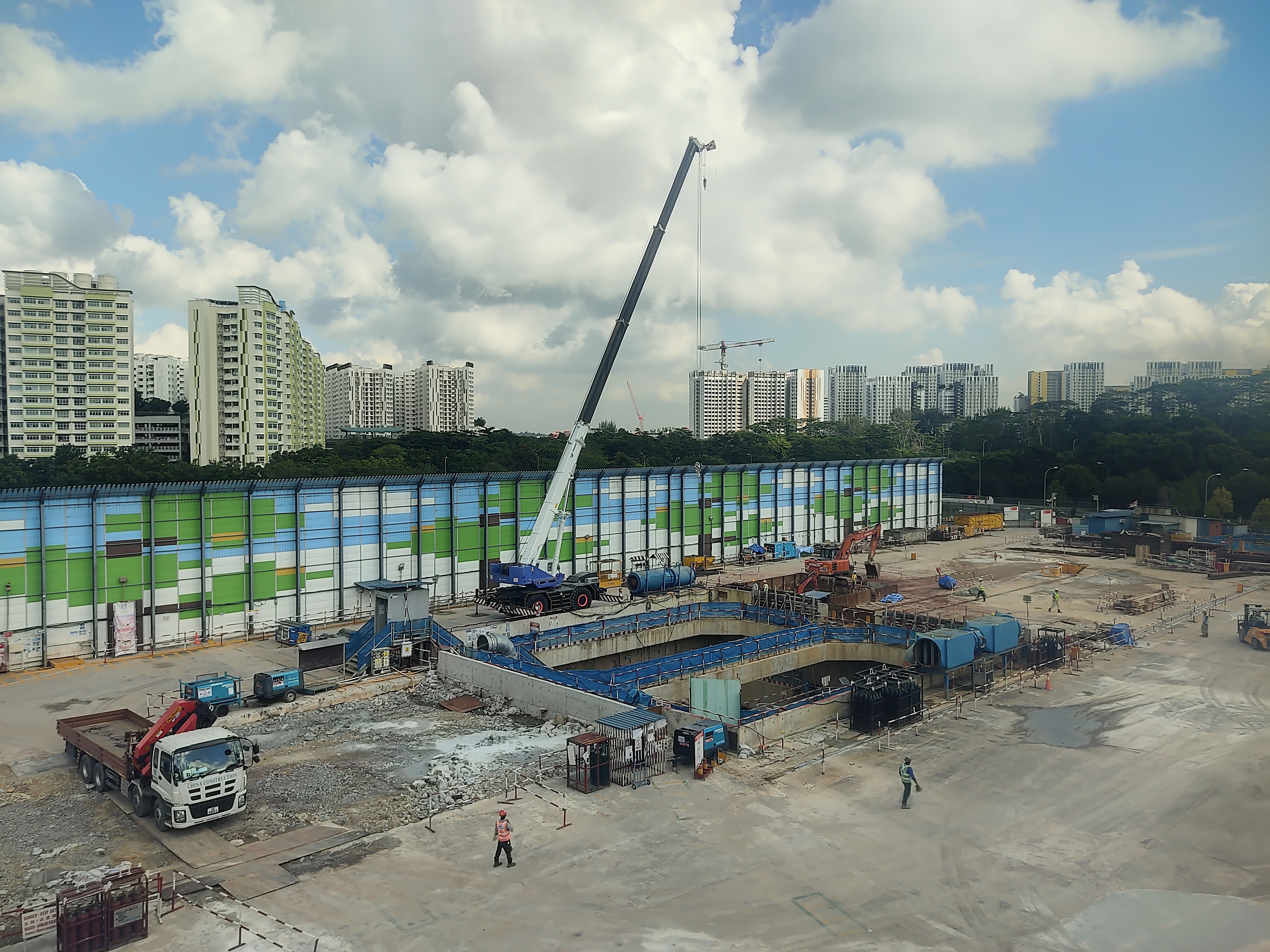
Construction of connecting tunnels to the Punggol Coast station

On 17 January 2013, Transport Minister Lui Tuck Yew announced a one-station extension of the NEL to serve upcoming developments in Punggol North. Although it was initially planned to extend the line by 2030, Second Minister for Transport Ng Chee Meng announced on 7 June 2017 that the 1.6-kilometre (0.99-mile) extension would be moved up to 2023 in conjunction with development plans for the area.

The contract for the extension was awarded to China State Construction Engineering Corporation Limited (Singapore Branch) in December, and construction began that month. Although tunnelling was completed on 13 November 2020, Transport Minister Ong Ye Kung said at the tunnel breakthrough ceremony that the Punggol Coast station's completion would be delayed until 2024 due to delays caused by the COVID-19 pandemic. In June and July 2024, NEL operations began later at 8 am on Sundays to integrate testing and commissioning works with the new station. As previously announced by the LTA on 10 October 2024, Punggol Coast station opened on 10 December.

== Network and operations ==
=== Service ===
Map of the line

The NEL operates between 5:30 am and 12:30 am. On weekdays and Saturdays, the first train leaves Punggol Coast (the northern terminus) at 5:39 am; the last train leaves HarbourFront (the southern terminus) at 11:56 pm. Trains run every 2.5 to 5 minutes, and the line's total travel time is 35 minutes. According to Transport Minister Jeffrey Siow, up to 40 trains run on the line during morning peak hours. The NEL recorded 527,000 daily passenger trips in 2022. By 2025, following the extension to Punggol Coast, NEL ridership reached 593,000 daily trips. Daily ridership in the first half of 2026 rose to 602,000.

The NEL initially had a higher fare than the North–South and East–West lines due to greater operating costs. On 30 December 2016, however, fares were lowered to match the other lines with a "purely distance-based approach". This revision, made after a fare review by the Public Transport Council, was intended to minimise commuter confusion. To ease the morning crowds riding on the NEL, from 27 December 2025, free fares apply to those tapping in at any of the stations from Kovan to Punggol Coast on weekday mornings before 7.30 am, or between 9 am and 9.45 am. The LTA reported in March 2026 that nearly 8% of commuters had shifted their travel out of the morning peak during the week of 2 February 2026. In May, Transport Minister Siow said the number has increased to 9%. In October 2026, it was announced that the free morning journeys scheme will be extended by another year to 26 December 2027.

The first line operated by SBS Transit, the NEL has been part of the New Rail Financing Framework (NRFF) since 2018. Previously, the operator (the owner of the rail assets) had to bear the cost of maintaining and upgrading trains and signalling. Under the NRFF, the LTA will take control of its operating assets, and SBS Transit will operate the line under a 15-year licence which will expire on 31 March 2033. Both the LTA and SBS Transit will share the profits and financial risks in operating the line.

=== Route ===
As its name implies, the fully-underground 22-kilometre (14-mile) NEL runs from Singapore's city centre to the northeastern parts of the island. The line goes northeast from HarbourFront station, paralleling New Bridge Road and Eu Tong Street in Chinatown between the Outram Park and Clarke Quay stations. Passing under the Singapore River and Fort Canning Hill to Dhoby Ghaut station, it continues north to Little India station under Bukit Timah Road. Following Race Course Road and Serangoon Road through Little India and Boon Keng, it crosses the Whampoa and Kallang Rivers before reaching Potong Pasir.

Between the Potong Pasir and Kovan stations, the NEL parallels Upper Serangoon Road before curving north to Hougang station. The line then runs along Hougang Avenue 6 and Sengkang Central to Sengkang station in Sengkang as well as Punggol station in Punggol. It then curves east towards Punggol Coast station. The line is coloured purple on official maps.

=== Stations ===
The line has 17 stations from HarbourFront to Punggol Coast. Eight stations (eventually nine upon completion of the Cross Island Line) connect to other MRT/LRT lines. A station designated "NE2", which was included in the 1991 master plan between HarbourFront and Outram Park, may be built if development warrants it.

Station code	Name	Images	Interchange; Adjacent transportation	Opening
NE1 CC29	HarbourFront	Symmetrical view of HarbourFront station platform	Circle Line ― HarbourFront	20 June 2003; 23 years ago
NE3 EW16 TE17	Outram Park	View of Outram Park island platform	East–West Line; Thomson–East Coast Line	20 June 2003; 23 years ago
NE4 DT19	Chinatown	View of Chinatown island platform	Downtown Line	20 June 2003; 23 years ago
NE5	Clarke Quay	View of Clarke Quay island platform	—	20 June 2003; 23 years ago
NE6 NS24 CC1	Dhoby Ghaut	View of Dhoby Ghaut island platform	North–South Line; Circle Line	20 June 2003; 23 years ago
NE7 DT12	Little India	Symmetrical view of Little India station platform	Downtown Line	20 June 2003; 23 years ago
NE8	Farrer Park	View of Farrer Park island platform	—	20 June 2003; 23 years ago
NE9	Boon Keng	View of Boon Keng island platform	—	20 June 2003; 23 years ago
NE10	Potong Pasir	View of Potong Pasir island platform	—	20 June 2003; 23 years ago
NE11	Woodleigh	View of Woodleigh island platform	Woodleigh	20 June 2011; 15 years ago
NE12 CC13	Serangoon	View of Serangoon island platform	Circle Line ― Serangoon	20 June 2003; 23 years ago
NE13	Kovan	View of Kovan island platform	—	20 June 2003; 23 years ago
NE14 CR8	Hougang	View of Hougang island platform	Cross Island Line (2030) ― Hougang Central	20 June 2003; 23 years ago
NE15	Buangkok	Symmetrical view of Buangkok island platform	Buangkok	15 January 2006; 20 years ago
NE16 STC	Sengkang	Symmetrical view of Sengkang island platform	Sengkang LRT ― Sengkang	20 June 2003; 23 years ago
NE17 PTC CP4	Punggol	View of Punggol island platform	Punggol LRT; Cross Island Line (Punggol Extension) (2032) ― Punggol	20 June 2003; 23 years ago
NE18	Punggol Coast		Punggol Coast	10 December 2024; 1 year ago

== Infrastructure ==
=== Rolling stock ===
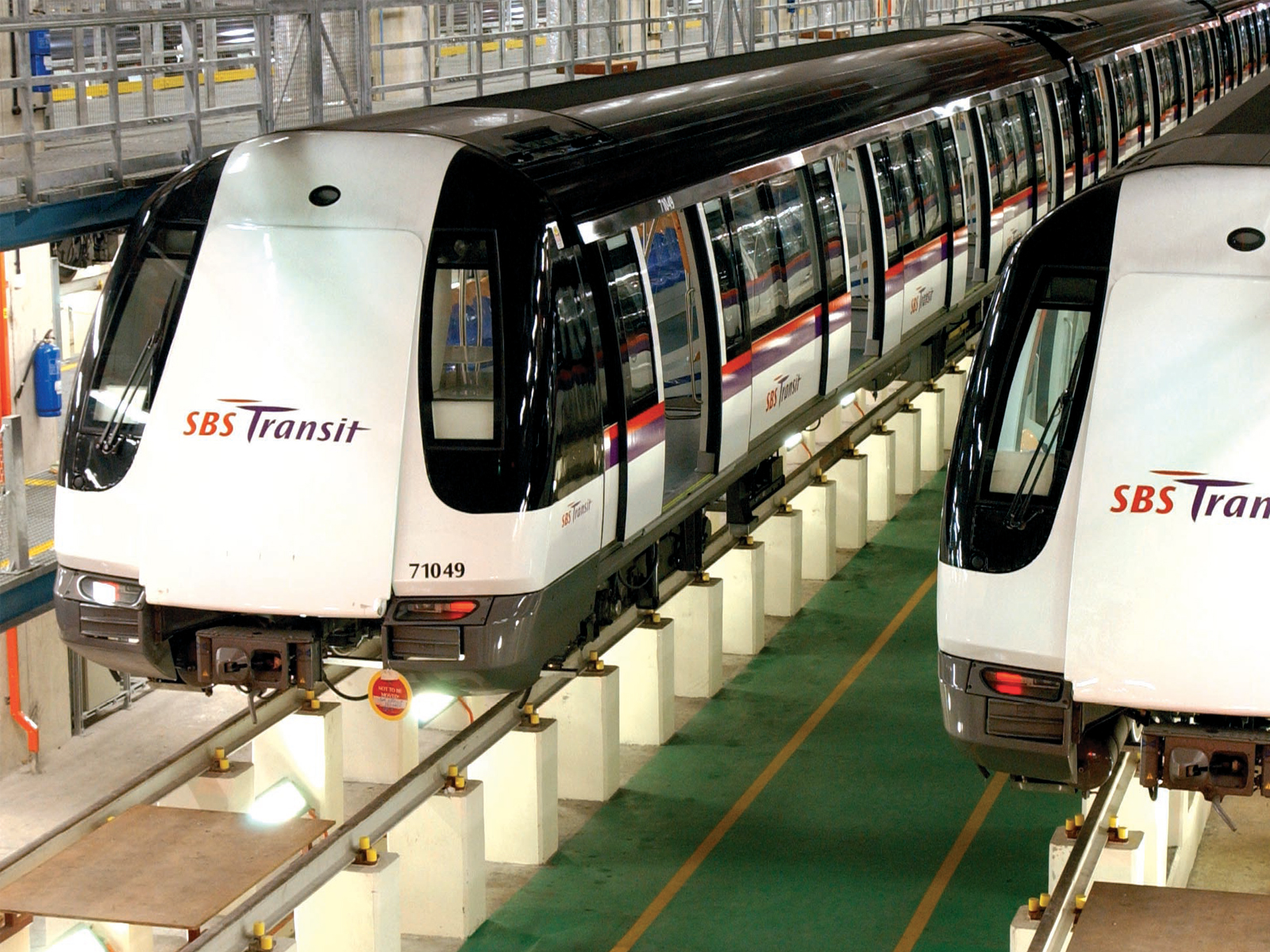
Alstom Metropolis C751A trains stabled in Sengkang Depot

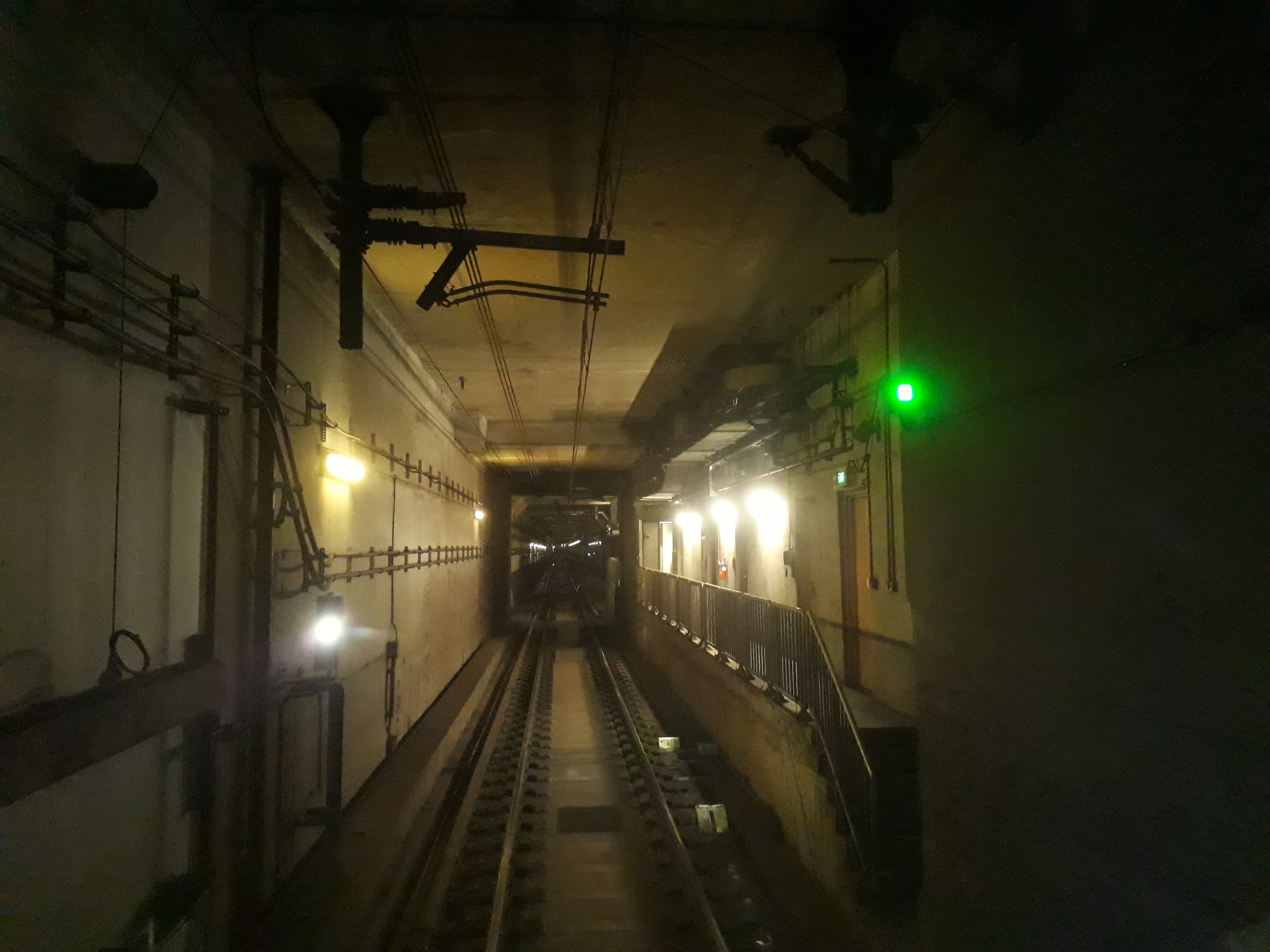
The NEL is the only line that uses an overhead catenary electrification system.

The NEL's rolling stock has six-car electric multiple unit (EMU) trains, with four doors per side on each carriage, and can accommodate up to 1,920 passengers per trainset. Twenty-five first-generation Alstom Metropolis C751A trains were ordered, built in France by Alstom in 2000 and 2001. An additional 18 second-generation Alstom Metropolis C751C trains, an updated version of the C751A, were delivered to Singapore beginning in July 2014. To increase the line extension's passenger capacity, an additional six third-generation Alstom Metropolis C851E trains were ordered. Built in Barcelona, the first trainset arrived in Singapore on 4 April 2021 and entered service on 28 July 2023.

The automatic trains are controlled by an operations control centre (OCC) at Sengkang Depot. The fleet's brake systems permit smooth, quiet stopping. Train speeds can reach 100 km/h (62 mph). Safety features include closed-circuit television cameras for train interiors and a passenger emergency communications system which allows communication between passengers and the OCC. The trains have wide seats and dedicated space for wheelchair users.

The trains are made of fire-resistant materials and include fire and smoke detectors and a fire barrier under its frame. They have a pair of beams (rail guards) which detect obstacles in the train's path; smaller debris is swept away, and the train automatically stops if the beams detect larger objects. A 1,500V overhead catenary system (OCS) powers the trains, (Note: The NELe will use a Siemens overhead conductor rail instead of an OCS.) the MRT network's first electrical system of that type. The OCS provides a safer environment for maintenance workers on the tracks and is less expensive, with a smaller conductor. In an emergency when the train is stopped, the doors on both sides can be opened easily without electricity and ramps lower for passenger evacuation in the tunnels.

In 2019, the first-generation trains began undergoing a mid-life refurbishment which is scheduled for completion by the third quarter of 2024. Upgrades include the replacement of interior parts and the installation of a new condition-monitoring system which will monitor train performance. The first refurbished train re-entered service on 28 February 2022. Refurbishment of the fleet was officially completed in April 2026.

With the passenger trains, the NEL tunnels and tracks are maintained by a fleet of engineering trains. There are four types of engineering trains: the locomotive, for towing wagons with equipment; the heavy crane vehicle, for changing tracks; the multi-function vehicle, for detecting flaws on rails and in tunnels; and the rail-grinding machine, for grinding rails back into shape. The engineering trains are manufactured by Plasser & Theurer, Speno, and Harsco Rail. A new fleet of engineering trains has been supplied by CRRC Zhuzhou Locomotive.

=== Depot ===
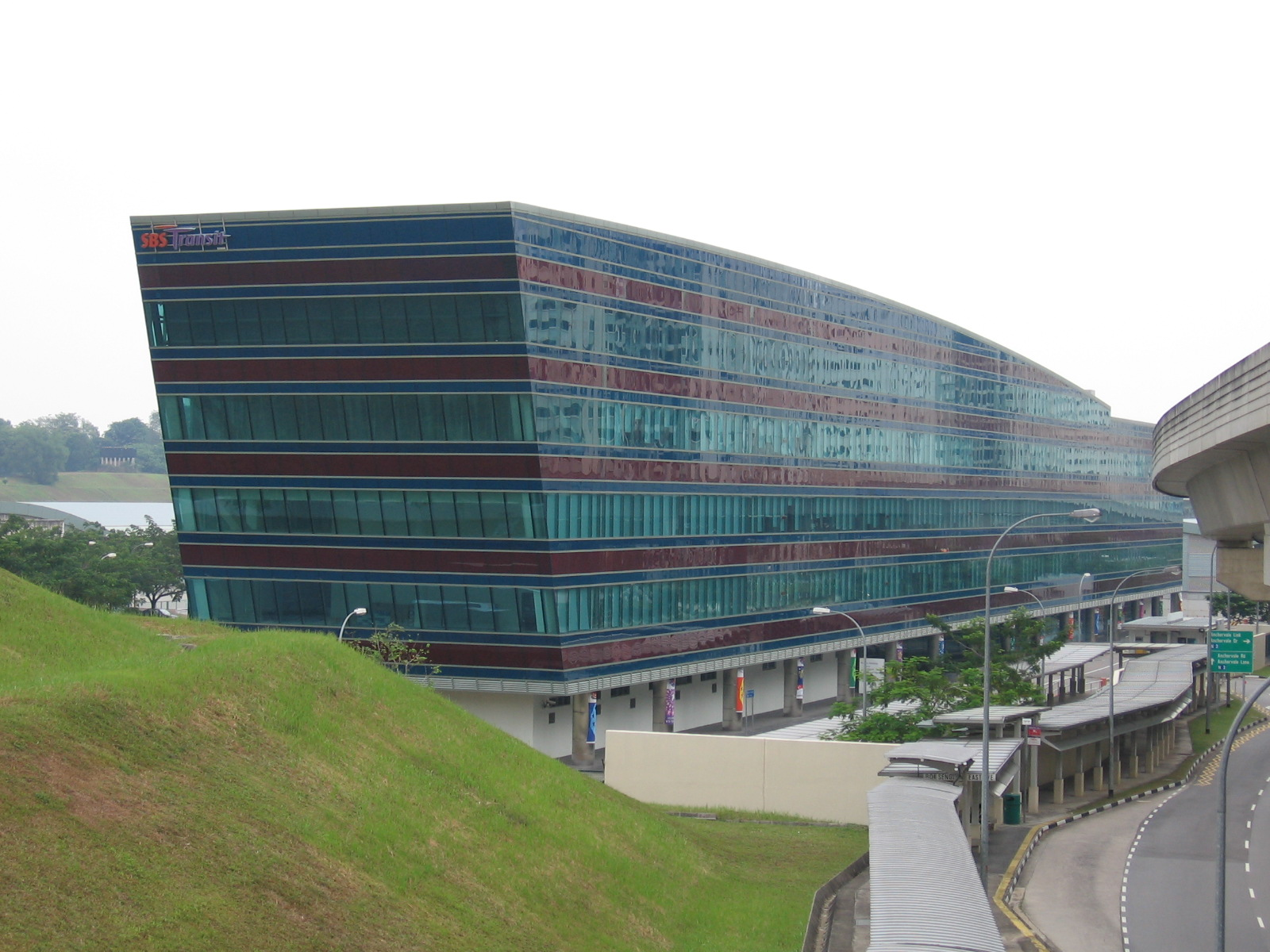
Sengkang Depot administrative building

The Sengkang Depot, located along Sengkang East Avenue between the Buangkok and Sengkang stations, is the service and storage area for NEL trains. Built by Hyundai Engineering and Construction for S$350 million (US$235.72 million), the 27 ha (67-acre) depot includes the OCC which monitors the line's train and station operations.

The depot can accommodate up to 44 trains, with three additional stabling tracks being built for the NELe as of 2019. It also houses LRT trains for the Sengkang and Punggol LRT lines above the depot.

Its facilities include a four-storey administrative building, maintenance bays, a workshop and an automated warehouse. The depot's workshop has equipment which can raise an entire train for repairs – the first such workshop in Singapore. Using the NEL's signalling system, train movement in the depot is mainly automatic. Staff members access the area via three dedicated tunnels for safety reasons.

The OCC also controls the equipment and systems of tunnels, stations, power substations and the depot, which are integrated into one terminal. The systems are managed by four or five rotating teams working around the clock. Alongside a training and software-development room, the OCC has a depot control centre to monitor and supervise its operations.

=== Signalling ===
The NEL is fully automatic, using Alstom's Urbalis 300 moving-block signalling system. The NEL is the world's first fully automated heavy-rail system. Its construction allowed the LTA to explore, integrate and implement new and existing technology as part of its vision of a fully-automated system. The line's automatic train control (ATC) is based on Alstom's MASTRIA software, which also manages its automatic train protection (ATP) and automatic train operation (ATO). The Urbalis system also includes a computer-based interlocking system which controls the track switches and interfaces with the ATC and the data-management system. The DMS, monitored by station staff, oversees the signalling equipment, platform doors and trains.

The ATP system maintains a buffer between trains. The minimum permitted distance is 30 metres (98 ft), although the average distance between trains is at least 600 metres (2,000 ft). Using microwave technology, the IAGO waveguide (Note: Informatisation et Automatisation par Guide d'Onde or waveguide transmission line system for computer and automation applications) allows two-way communication between trains and monitors the trains' positions and movements. If a train enters the buffer, the ATP automatically adjusts the train's speed.

At least 500 computer systems control the NEL. In case of a glitch, backup systems would take over; the system would "go to sleep" if it experiences a severe malfunction. In the event of system failure, drivers would be deployed to manually operate the trains. The NEL maintains its "mean kilometres between failures" target of one million train-km (620,000 train-miles). As part of an NEL refurbishment programme announced on 17 December 2018, parts of the power and signalling systems were serviced and new rail crossings and tracks installed.

== Station facilities ==
Every station has a passenger service centre (PSC) on its concourse. The PSCs are generally curved, unlike the boxier designs of those in older MRT stations. In addition to assisting passengers and checking and topping up their fare cards, the PSC staff monitors and controls the functions of connecting tunnels and communicates with the OCC at the depot. When a station is used as a civil-defence (CD) shelter, the PSC becomes the command centre.

Each NEL station is equipped with "energy-smart" Otis escalators connecting its levels. Their speed is reduced by half when not in use, reducing energy consumption and wear and tear. The Woodleigh station has one of the longest sets of escalators at 38.5 metres (126 ft). In addition to escalators, Dhoby Ghaut is the first MRT station with a set of 55-metre (180 ft) travellators which link the NEL and NSL platforms.

All NEL stations have lifts which provide step-free access to their platforms. Most of the lifts have glass doors, which improve appearance and enhance security. Each lift has a communications system, connected to the station's PSC. If a lift stalls during a station blackout, a battery-powered backup system provides lighting and ventilation for four hours.

=== Accessibility ===
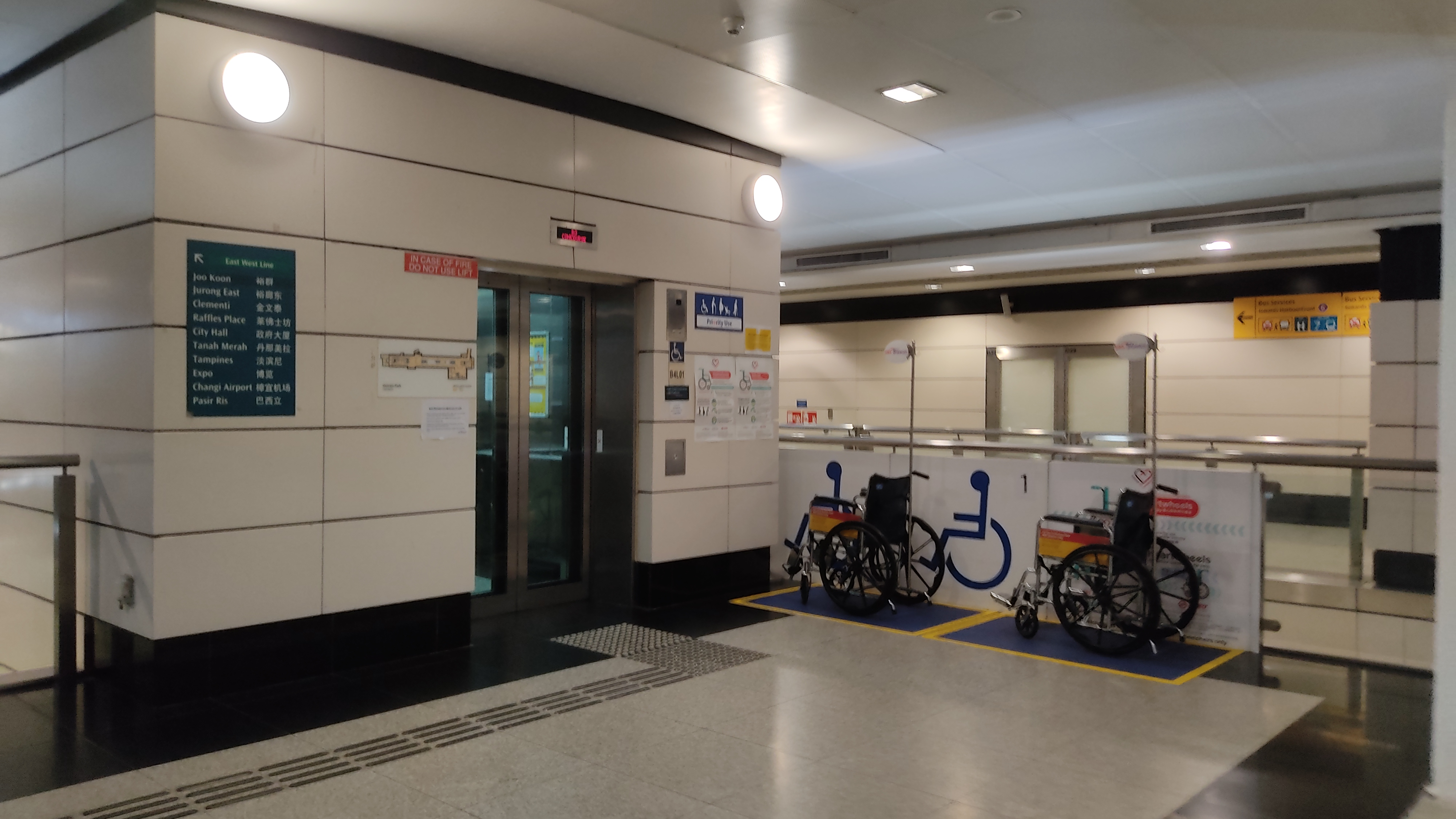
Tactile tiles on the floor linking to the station lift at Outram Park station. The station, being close to Singapore General Hospital, has wheelchairs provided for the elderly.

In compliance with Singapore's Code on Barrier-Free Accessibility, NEL stations have wheelchair-friendly facilities. Each station has an entrance that was built with barrier-free access via lifts and ramps, in contrast to older stations on previous lines which had to be retrofitted.

The NEL has the MRT's first tactile system. Consisting of tiles with raised rounded or elongated studs, the system intends to guide visually-impaired commuters through a station on a dedicated route from entrance to platforms. Station seats have armrests to assist those who have difficulty getting up.

These accessibility features were part of the recommendations of a LTA working group set up to improve accessibility on the MRT network. Associations representing the disabled were also consulted. The group completed its findings in 1999; only some of its recommendations had been adopted by 2003, since station infrastructure was nearly completed by then.

=== Safety ===
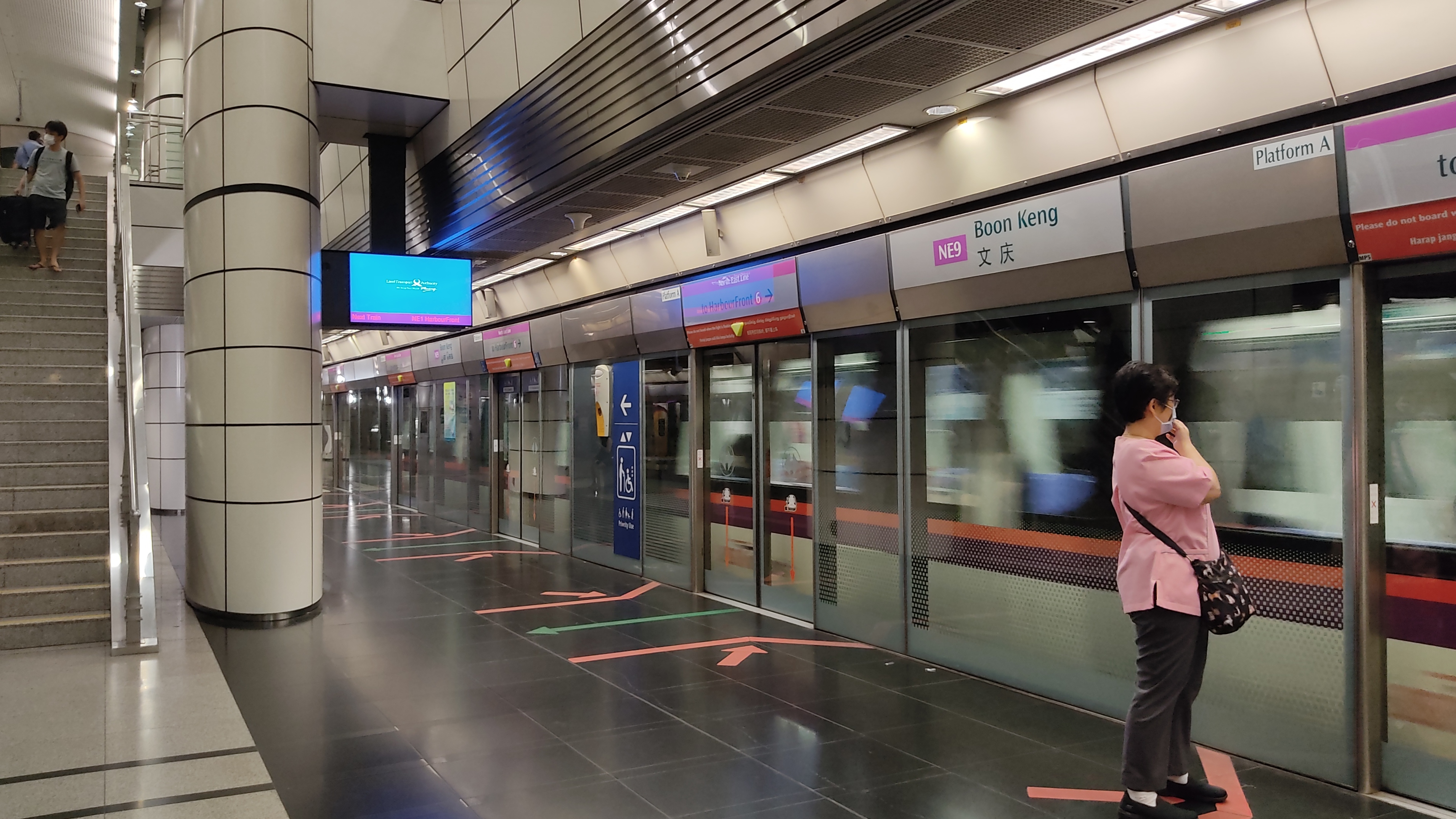
Platform screen doors at Boon Keng station

Westinghouse supplied 768 pairs of platform screen doors (PSDs) to the NEL's original 16 stations. The PSDs are a safety barrier between passengers on platforms and trains. The PSDs enable climate control in a station, minimising the loss of cool air from the platforms and preventing warm air from entering the station from the tunnels. The Punggol Coast station's PSDs are supplied by ST Engineering Electronics. The platforms have emergency-stop plungers (ESPs) to halt trains in an emergency.

More than 10,000 smoke and heat detectors are installed in the NEL's stations as part of the line's fire-alarm system. The alarm, which automatically alerts SBS Transit of any faults in the system, is integrated with the public address system; instead of alarm bells, pre-recorded messages would assist commuters in evacuating. In addition to the detectors, sprinkler and hose reel systems, dry riser pipeworks and an inert-gas system would contain a fire.

During a fire, escalators could be shut down remotely from the PSC and the fare gates opened for evacuation. The air-conditioning system would be shut down to minimise re-circulation of smoke. An installed "smoke curtain" system controls smoke movement, and automatic smoke-extraction fans remove any contained smoke.

=== Civil defence ===
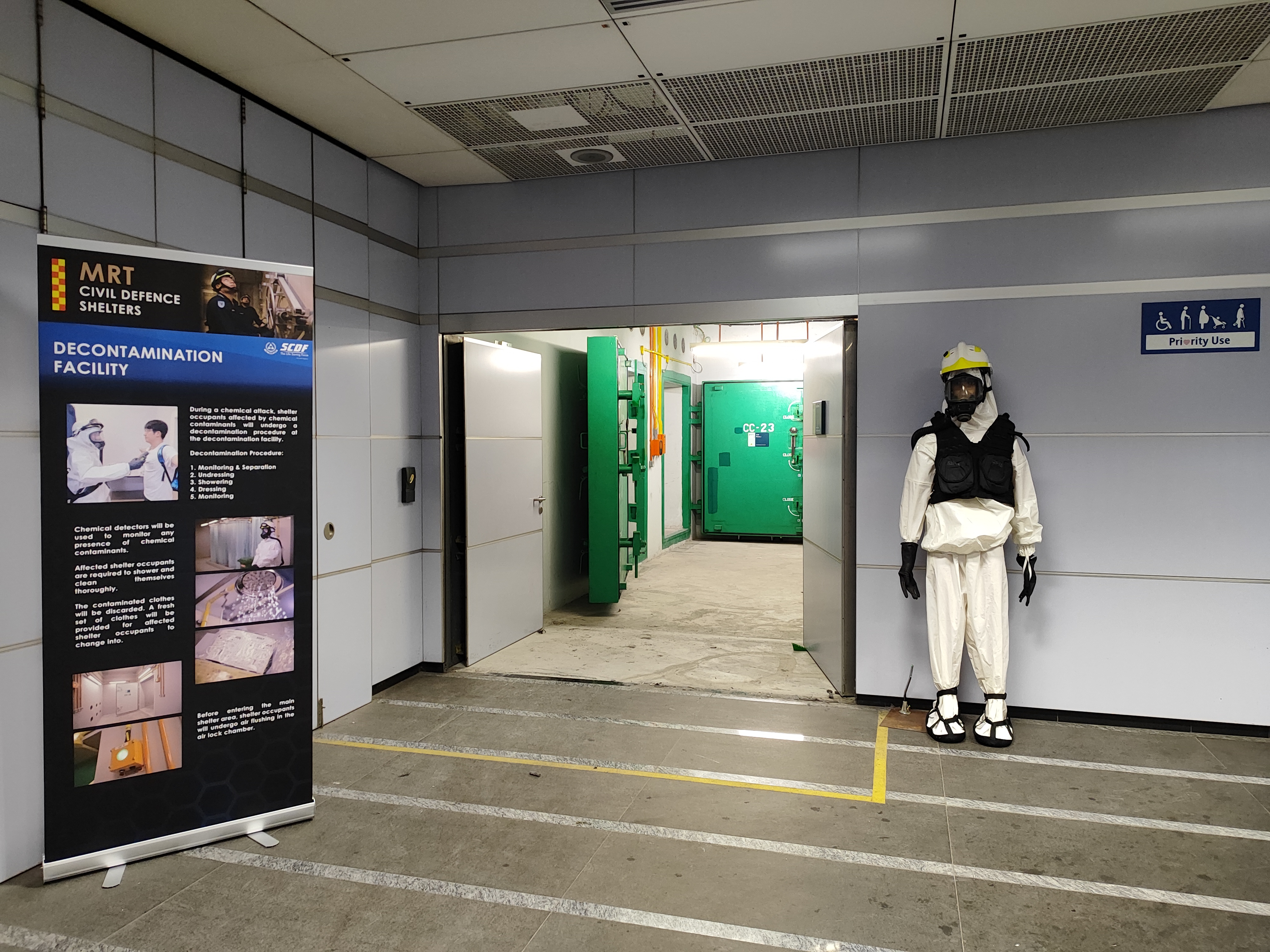
The decontamination facilities at Potong Pasir station

All NEL stations except Dhoby Ghaut, Sengkang, Punggol and Punggol Coast are designated civil-defence (CD) shelters. Each CD station is designed to accommodate at least 7,500 people and withstand airstrikes and chemical attacks. Equipment essential for shelter operations are mounted on shock absorbers to prevent damage during a bombing. When electricity supply to the shelter is disrupted, backup generators are used.

During emergencies, large sliding doors would seal the entrances and the tunnel portals would be manually sealed by blast doors. The shelters have built-in decontamination chambers and dry toilets, with collection bins which would remove human waste from the shelter. The toilets are next to an exhaust ventilation outlet to remove odors.

== Culture ==
=== Architecture ===
Station architecture

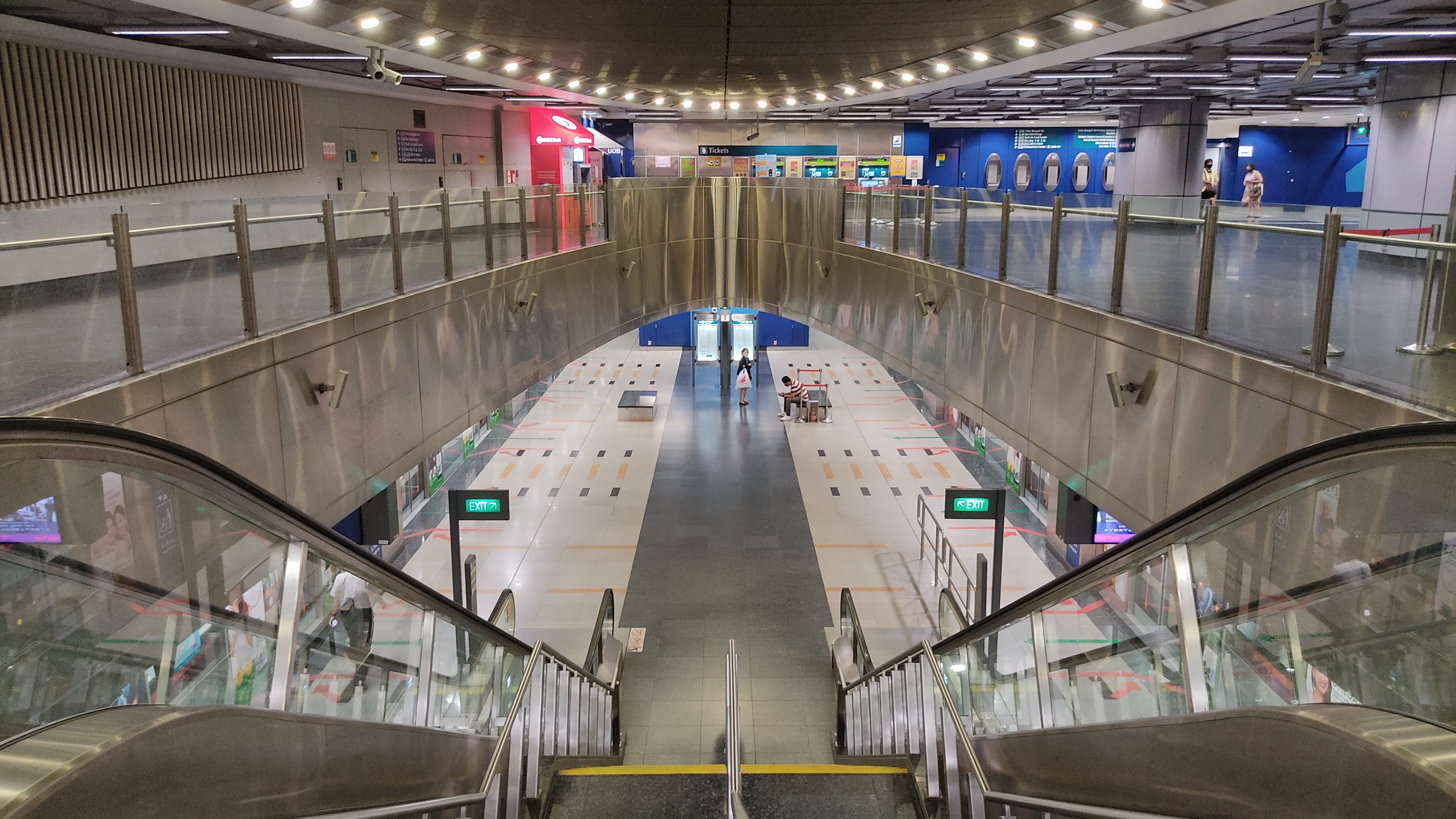
HarbourFront station, with its elliptical ship-hull motif

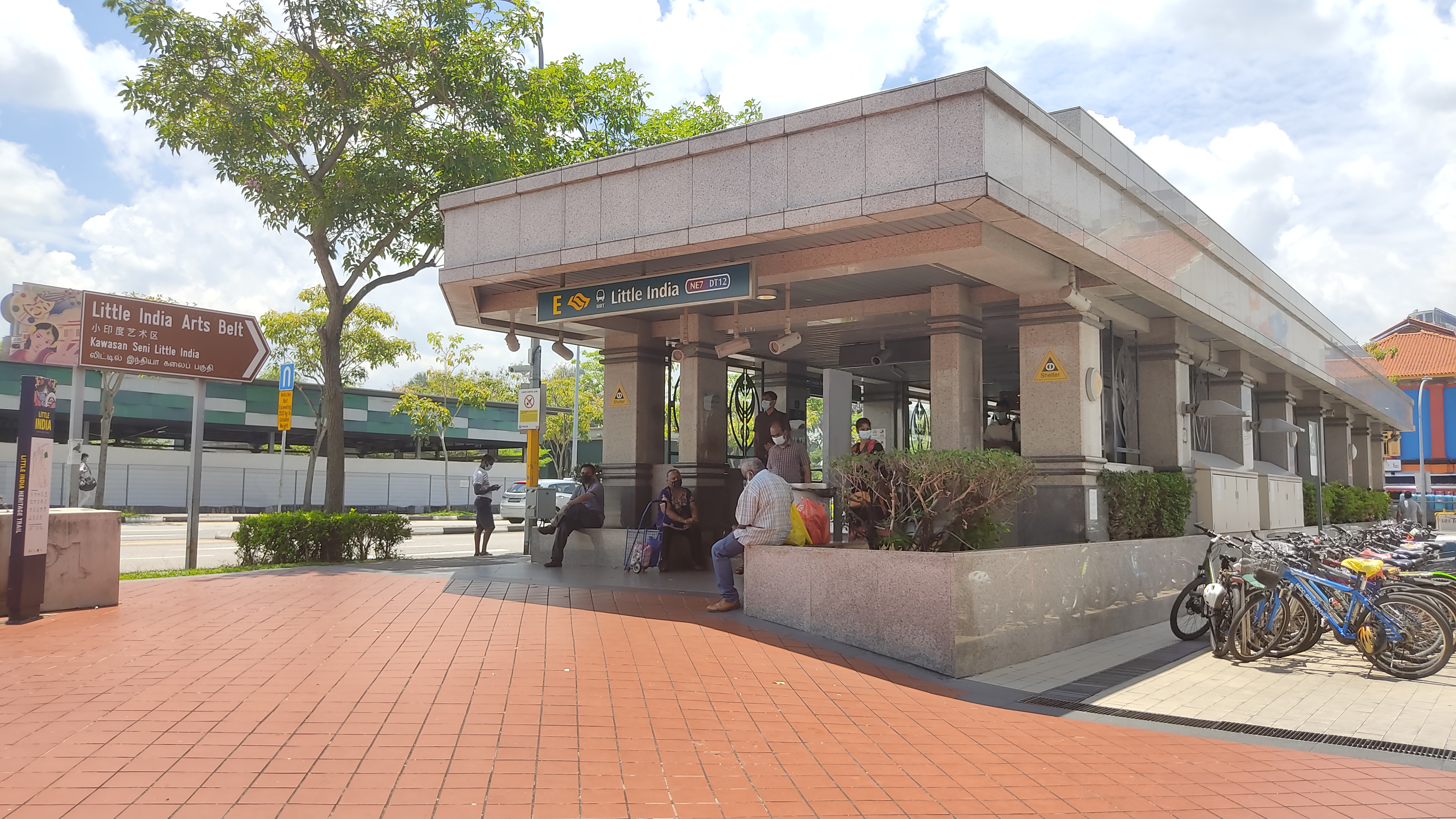
Entrance to Little India station, with leaf-shaped patterns on metal grills

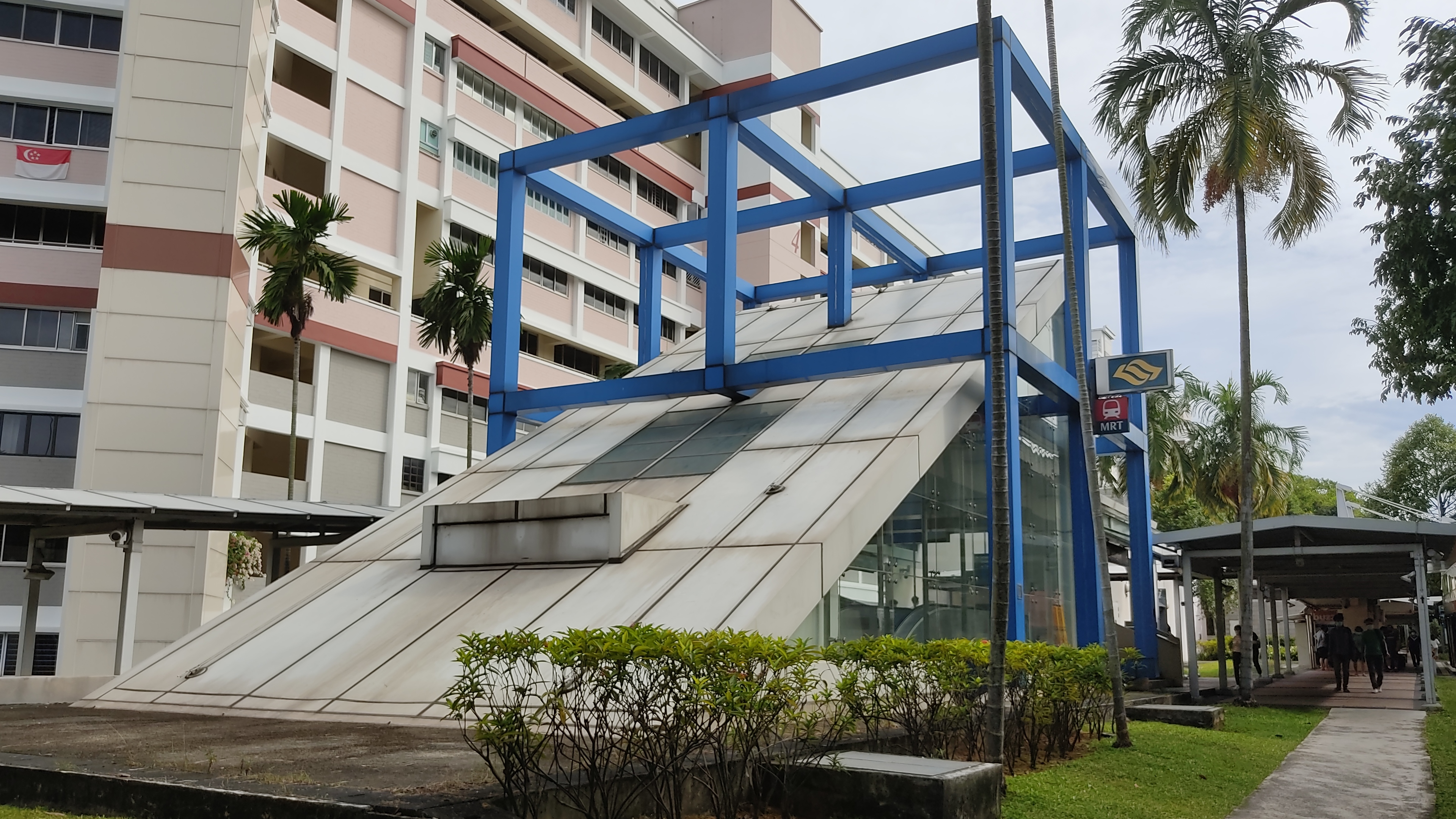
Each of the triangular entrances at the Serangoon station is enclosed by a cubic structure.

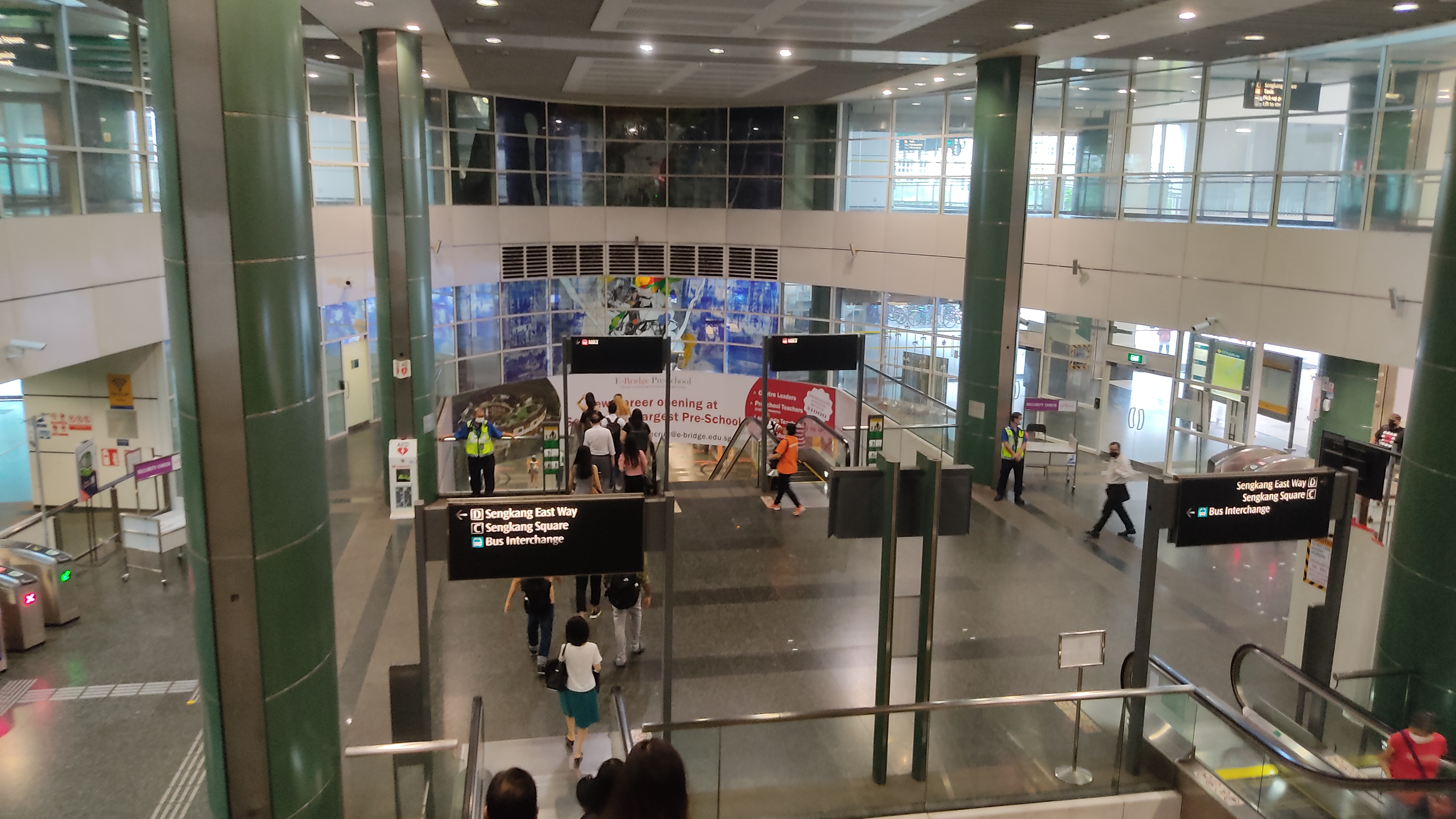
Sengkang station concourse

Each of the NEL stations has a unique design which reflects its location. The HarbourFront station has a maritime theme, with an elliptical ship's-hull motif used for the ceiling and concourse entrances to the platforms. At Little India, the station walls' metal grills have leaf-shaped patterns similar to the door patterns of Hindu prayer rooms. The station's design was intended to reflect Indian traditions.

Station entrances use glass, allowing natural lighting during the day. Exit A of the Chinatown station has a transparent pavilion-style roof, which allows natural light and provides an unobstructed view of the shophouses along Pagoda Street. At Serangoon, each of its four triangular-shaped entrances is painted a different colour and enclosed in a cubic structure. Unlike at the other NEL stations, the entrances to Buangkok do not use glass; white Teflon sheets are supported by metal frames.

Dhoby Ghaut station is the MRT network's largest, and the five-level station is integrated with the twin-towered office complex Atrium@Orchard above it. The network's first such integration of an MRT station with a commercial development, it permits more efficient land use and improves access to public transport. The station's NEL platforms, 28 metres (92 ft) underground, are some of the MRT's deepest.

The four-level Sengkang station is an integrated hub, with Singapore's three public-transport modes – MRT, LRT and bus – serving the Sengkang area. The MRT/LRT station was the MRT network's first intermodal station for all three transport modes. In addition to its transport facilities, the station is integrated with the Compass Heights and Compass Point developments.

Designed by the 3HPArchitects and Farrells architectural firms, the Punggol station is integrated with the LRT station and the bus interchange. Its curved aluminium and stainless-steel cladding gives the station a futuristic look befitting the Punggol 21 developments. Covering 320 metres (350 yards) along Punggol Central to accommodate bus stops, taxi stands and passenger drop-off points along the road, the station is the NEL's longest.

=== Artworks ===
The line introduced the MRT network's Art-in-Transit (AiT) programme, which showcases art in the network. Nineteen works by 20 artists are featured in its stations. Artists were selected by an art-review panel, which reviewed the artists' portfolios and managed conceptual development. Considered a "significant milestone" for public art in Singapore, AiT aims to enhance the riding experience. Unlike artwork in the original North–South and East–West Line stations, the works must be integrated into a station's design and reflect the history and heritage of its surroundings.

Artwork list
Station code	Station name	Artwork name	Artist(s)
NE1	HarbourFront	Enigmatic Appearances	Ian Woo
NE3	Outram Park	Memories	Wang Lu Sheng
NE3	Outram Park	Commuters	Teo Eng Seng
NE4	Chinatown	The Phoenix's-Eye Domain	Tan Swie Hian
NE5	Clarke Quay	The Reflections	Chua Ek Kay
NE6	Dhoby Ghaut	Interchange	Milenko and Delia Prvacki
NE6	Dhoby Ghaut	Universal Language	Sun Yu-Li
NE7	Little India	Memoirs of the Past	S. Chandrasekaran
NE8	Farrer Park	Rhythmic Exuberance	Poh Siew Wah
NE9	Boon Keng	Metamorphosis	Lim Poh Teck
NE10	Potong Pasir	Point of View	Matthew Ngui
NE11	Woodleigh	Slow Motion	April Ng
NE12	Serangoon	Memories of Childhood	Eng Joo Heng
NE13	Kovan	The Trade-off	Eng Tow
NE14	Hougang	Hands Up for Hougang	Seck Yok Ying
NE15	Buangkok	Water, Nature & Contemporary	Vincent Leow
NE16	Sengkang	T.R.A.N.S.I.T.I.O.N.S.	Koh Bee Liang
NE17	Punggol	Water, Landscape & Future	Goh Beng Kwan
NE18	Punggol Coast	TRAJECTORIES	Zul Othman

== Notes and references ==
=== Bibliography ===
- Leong, Chan Teik (2003). Getting There : The Story of the North East Line. Singapore: Land Transport Authority. ISBN 978-981-04-5886-7. OCLC 53383062.
- Tan, Su (2003). Art in Transit : North East Line MRT. Singapore: Land Transport Authority. ISBN 978-981-04-7384-6. OCLC 52771106.
