= Alstom Metropolis C751C =

Class of electric multiple units in Singapore

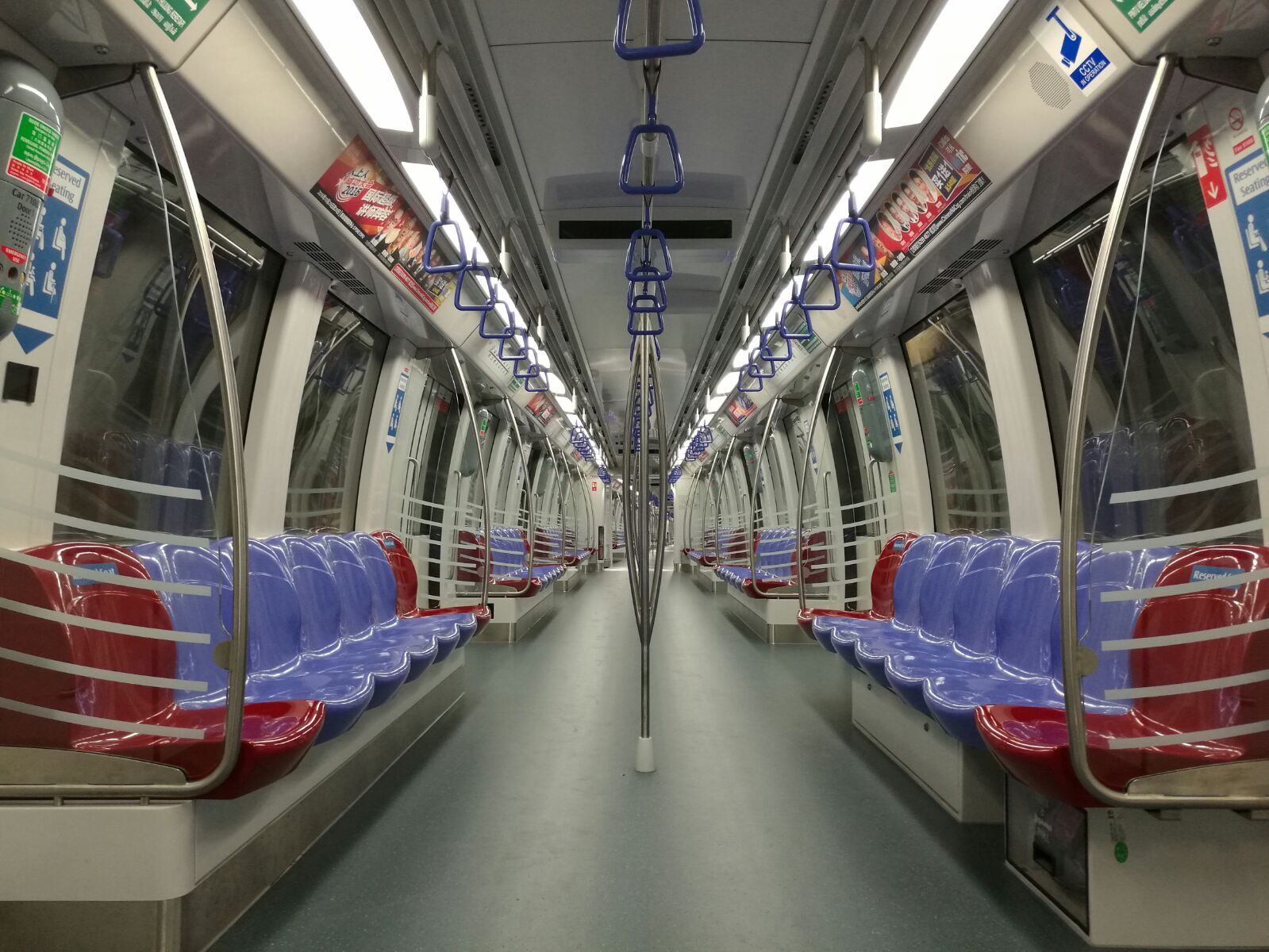
- Interior of a C751C train
- Stock type: Electric multiple unit
- In service: 1 October 2015; 11 years ago – Present
- Manufacturers: Shanghai Alstom Transport (Alstom and Shanghai Electric)
- Built at: Shanghai, China
- Family name: Metropolis
- Constructed: 2014 – 2016
- Entered service: 1 October 2015; 11 years ago
- Number built: 108 Vehicles (18 Sets)
- Number in service: 108 Vehicles (18 Sets)
- Formation: 6 per trainset DT–Mp–Mi+Mi–Mp–DT
- Fleet numbers: 7051/7052 – 7085/7086
- Capacity: 1920 passengers (320 per car)
- Operator: SBS Transit
- Depot: Sengkang
- Line served: North East Line

Specifications
- Car body construction: Welded Aluminium
- Train length: 138.5 m (454 ft 4 3/4 in)
- Car length: 23.65 m (77 ft 7 1/8 in) (DT); 22.8 m (74 ft 9 5/8 in) (Mp/Mi)
- Width: 3.2 m (10 ft 6 in)
- Height: 3.7 m (12 ft 1 5/8 in)
- Floor height: 1,100 mm (43 1/4 in)
- Doors: 1,450 mm (57 1/8 in), 8 per car, 4 per side
- Maximum speed: 100 km/h (62 mph) (design); 90 km/h (56 mph) (service)
- Traction system: Alstom OPTONIX IGBT–VVVF
- Traction motors: 16 × 150 kW (200 hp) 3-phase AC induction motor
- Power output: 2.4 MW (3,200 hp)
- Electric systems: 1,500 V DC overhead catenary
- Current collection: Pantograph
- UIC classification: 2′2′+Bo′Bo′+Bo′Bo′+Bo′Bo′+Bo′Bo′+2′2′
- Braking systems: Regenerative and pneumatic
- Safety systems: Alstom URBALIS 300 moving block CBTC ATC under ATO GoA 4 (UTO), with subsystems of ATP, Iconis ATS and Smartlock CBI
- Coupling system: Scharfenberg
- Track gauge: 1,435 mm (4 ft 8 1/2 in) standard gauge

The Alstom Metropolis C751C is the second generation of communication-based train control (CBTC) electric multiple unit rolling stock in operation on the North East Line of Singapore's Mass Rapid Transit (MRT) system. Eighteen 6-car train sets were manufactured by Shanghai Alstom Transport Co Ltd (joint venture of Alstom and Shanghai Electric), Deliveries began in July 2014, and all trainsets were delivered by 2015.

== Tender ==
The tender for trains under the contract 751C was opened together with another contract C830C for an additional 24 Circle Line trains which was closed on 18 July 2011 with 4 bids. The Land Transport Authority has shortlisted all of them and the tender results was published on 1 February 2012.

S/N	Name of Tenderer	Amount (S$)
1	Alstom Transport S.A. / Alstom Transport (S) Pte Ltd Consortium	234,900,000.00 (Base Tender 2 - Offered in mixed currencies, and hence the differences of amount shown in the tender document.)
2	Hyundai Rotem Company	284,954,400.00 (Base Tender 2)
3	Construcciones y Auxiliar de Ferrocarriles, S.A.	234,443,494.80 (Base Tender 2)
4	CRRC Zhuzhou Locomotive (formerly CSR Zhuzhou Electric Locomotive Co., Ltd.) / Siemens Pte Ltd, Singapore Consortium	245,076,923.08 (Base Tender 2)

== Driverless operation ==
The C751C is fully driverless under normal circumstances, using CBTC which do not require traditional "fixed-block track circuits" for determining train position. Instead, they rely on "continuous two-way digital communication" between each controlled train and a wayside control center, which may control an area of a railroad line, a complete line, or a group of lines. Recent studies consistently show that CBTC systems reduce life-cycle costs for the overall rail property and enhance operational flexibility and control.
