= Kawasaki Heavy Industries & CRRC Qingdao Sifang C151C =

Class of electric multiple units in Singapore

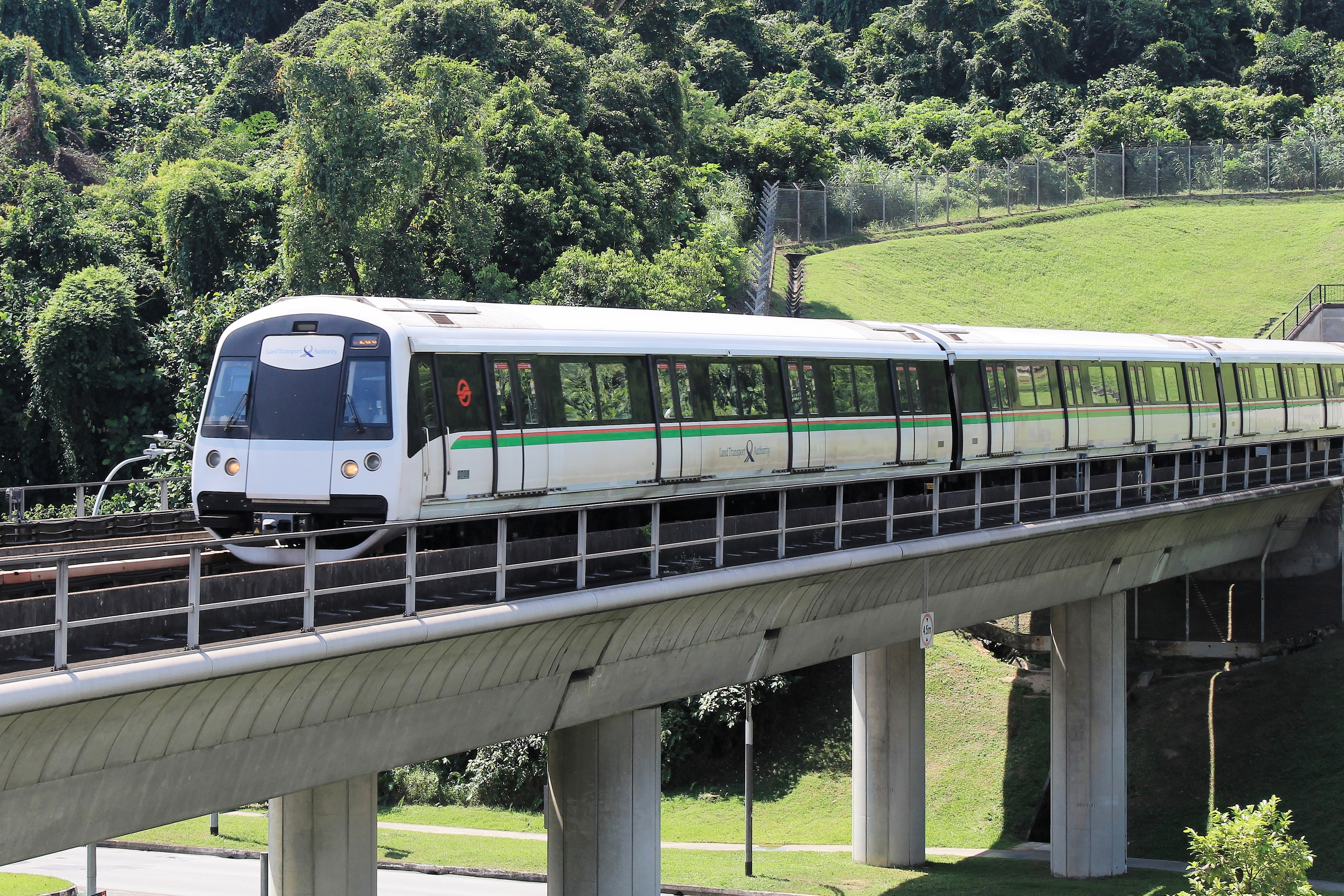
- C151C train approaching Bukit Batok station

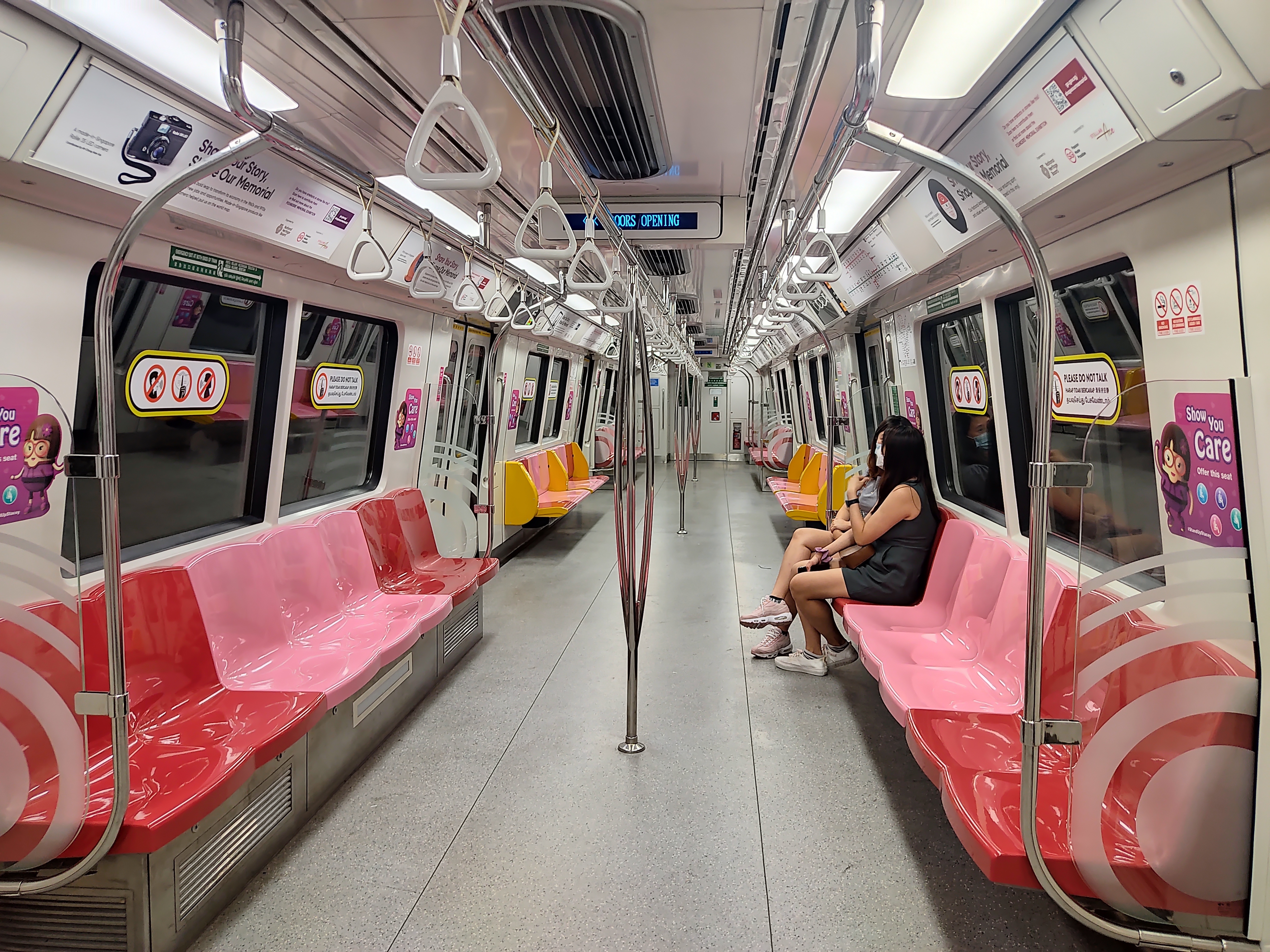
- Interior of a C151C train.
- Stock type: Electric multiple unit
- In service: 30 September 2018; 8 years ago – present
- Manufacturers: Kawasaki; CRRC Qingdao Sifang
- Built at: Qingdao, Shandong, China
- Constructed: 2017 – 2018
- Entered service: 30 September 2018; 8 years ago
- Refurbished: CRRC Qingdao Sifang; 2026 – mid-2030s
- Number built: 72 vehicles (12 sets)
- Number in service: 72 vehicles (12 sets)
- Formation: 6 per trainset DT–M1–M2+M2–M1–DT
- Fleet numbers: 701/702 – 723/724
- Capacity: 1920 passengers
- Operator: SMRT Trains
- Depots: Bishan; Ulu Pandan; Tuas; East Coast
- Lines served: North–South Line; East–West Line

Specifications
- Car body construction: Aluminium-alloy double-skinned construction
- Train length: 138.86 m (455 ft 6 7/8 in)
- Car length: 23.83 m (78 ft 2 in) (DT); 22.8 m (74 ft 10 in) (M)
- Width: 3.2 m (10 ft 6 in)
- Height: 3.7 m (12 ft 1 5/8 in)
- Doors: 1,450 mm (57 1/8 in), 8 per car, 4 per side
- Maximum speed: 90 km/h (56 mph) (design); 80 km/h (50 mph) (service)
- Traction system: Fuji Electric IGBT–VVVF (output 415 kVA)
- Traction motors: 16 × Fuji Electric MLR120 150 kW (201 hp) self-ventilated 3-phase AC induction motor 550V 204A 1765 r/min
- Power output: 2.24 MW (3,004 hp)
- Acceleration: 1 m/s^{2} (2.2 mph/s)
- Deceleration: 1.2 m/s^{2} (2.7 mph/s) (service); 1.3 m/s^{2} (2.9 mph/s) (emergency)
- Auxiliaries: Fuji Electric auxiliary inverter with battery charger 80 kVA + 16 kW
- Electric systems: 750 V DC third rail
- Current collection: Collector shoe
- UIC classification: 2′2′+Bo′Bo′+Bo′Bo′+Bo′Bo′+Bo′Bo′+2′2′
- Safety systems: Thales SelTrac® moving block CBTC ATC under ATO GoA 3 (DTO), with subsystems of ATP, NetTrac ATS and CBI
- Coupling system: Scharfenberg
- Track gauge: 1,435 mm (4 ft 8 1/2 in) standard gauge

The Kawasaki Heavy Industries & CRRC Qingdao Sifang C151C is a class of trains that are the sixth generation electric multiple unit rolling stock in operation on the existing North–South (NSL) and East–West (EWL) lines of Singapore's Mass Rapid Transit (MRT) system, manufactured by a consortium of Kawasaki Heavy Industries (KHI) and CRRC Qingdao Sifang under Contract 151C.

Twelve trains were purchased. They were delivered between 2017 and 2019, and were tested before the full service in 2019. The first was delivered on 27 October 2017. The interior design was unveiled on 28 February 2018 at Tuas Depot with two trains showcased. This brought the total number of trains operating on the NSEWL to 198 trainsets, up from the previous 186. The addition tripled the number of trains on the North–South and East–West Lines when they were first opened.

The first three C151C trainsets commenced revenue service on 30 September 2018 on the North–South Line.

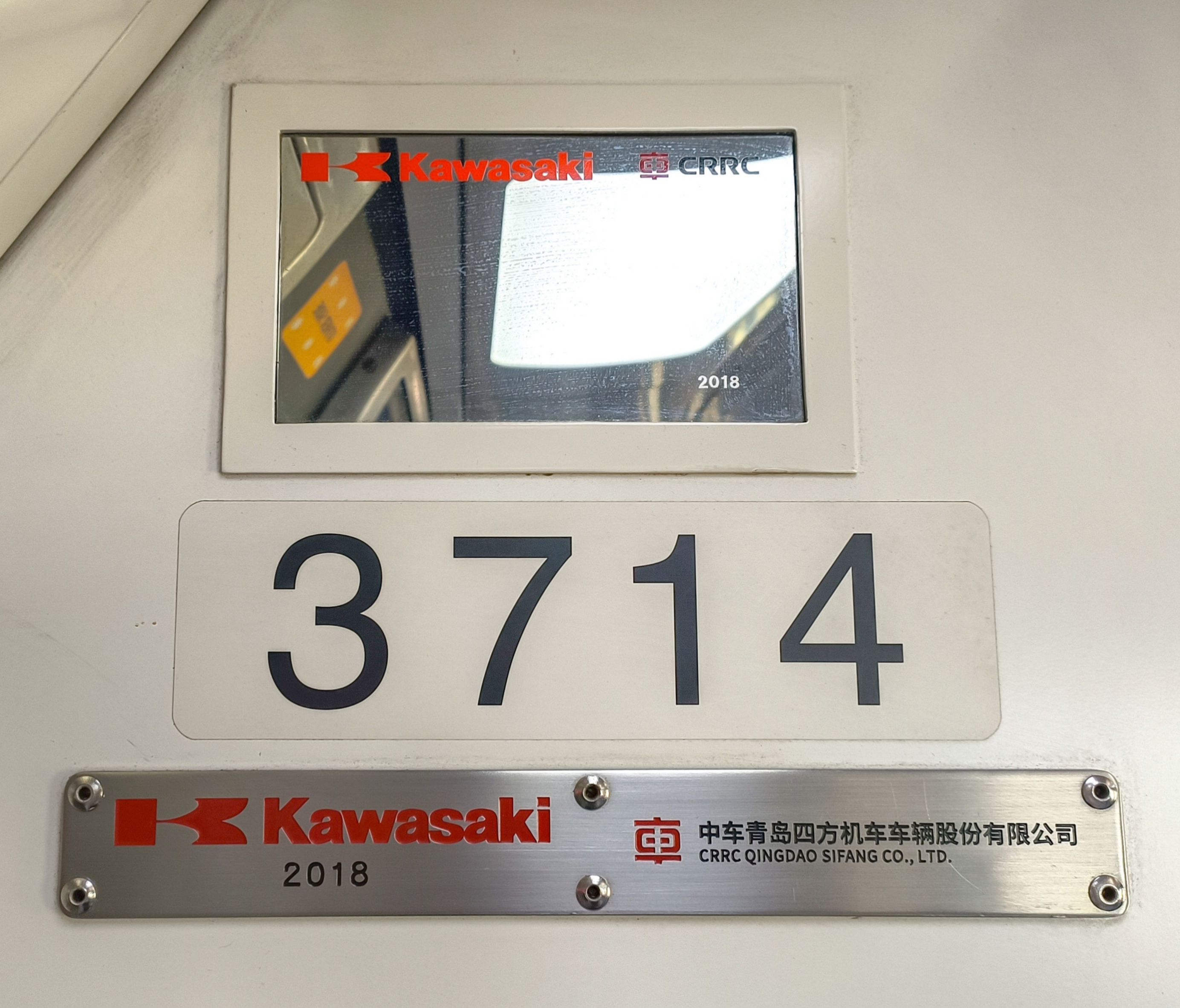
Builder's plate of a C151C train

== Refurbishment ==
All 92 trains from the KSF fleet, consisting of C151As, C151Bs and C151Cs will undergo refurbishment works from 2026 onwards, and is expected to be completed by the mid-2030s.

== Tender ==
The tender for these trains under the contract 151C was closed on 14 May 2015 with three bids. The LTA has shortlisted all of them and the tender results were published on 22 September that year. Kawasaki has won the contract, similar to C151A and C151B.

S/N	Name of Tenderer	Amount (S$)
1	CRRC Zhuzhou Locomotive Co., Ltd.	134,608,695.70
2	Kawasaki Heavy Industries, Ltd. / Kawasaki Heavy Industries (Singapore) Pte Ltd & CRRC Qingdao Sifang Consortium	136,800,000.00 (Alternative)
3	Hyundai Rotem	136,799,928.00

== Design ==
The C151C was the first and only MRT rolling stock to be fitted with tip-up seats until April 2021 when the second batch of the T251 trains entered service in tandem with the opening of the Thomson–East Coast Line Stage 2.

== Doubts about the consortium ==
The award of the C151C turnkey contract to the Kawasaki Heavy Industries & CSR Qingdao Sifang consortium was briefly politicised in Singapore, when the defects from the relatively new C151A trains constructed by the same consortium were made public on 5 July 2016. This was after Gerald Giam from the Workers Party, commenting through an official Facebook post, doubted the decision by the Land Transport Authority to award the subsequent contracts, specifically both the design and supply of C151C and T251 rail cars to the same consortium in 2015. This was despite the Land Transport Authority and operator SMRT Trains officially acknowledging the C151A crack defects as early as 2013.
