= Kawasaki Heavy Industries & CSR Qingdao Sifang C151A =

Class of electric multiple units in Singapore

Kawasaki Heavy Industries & CRRC Qingdao Sifang C151A
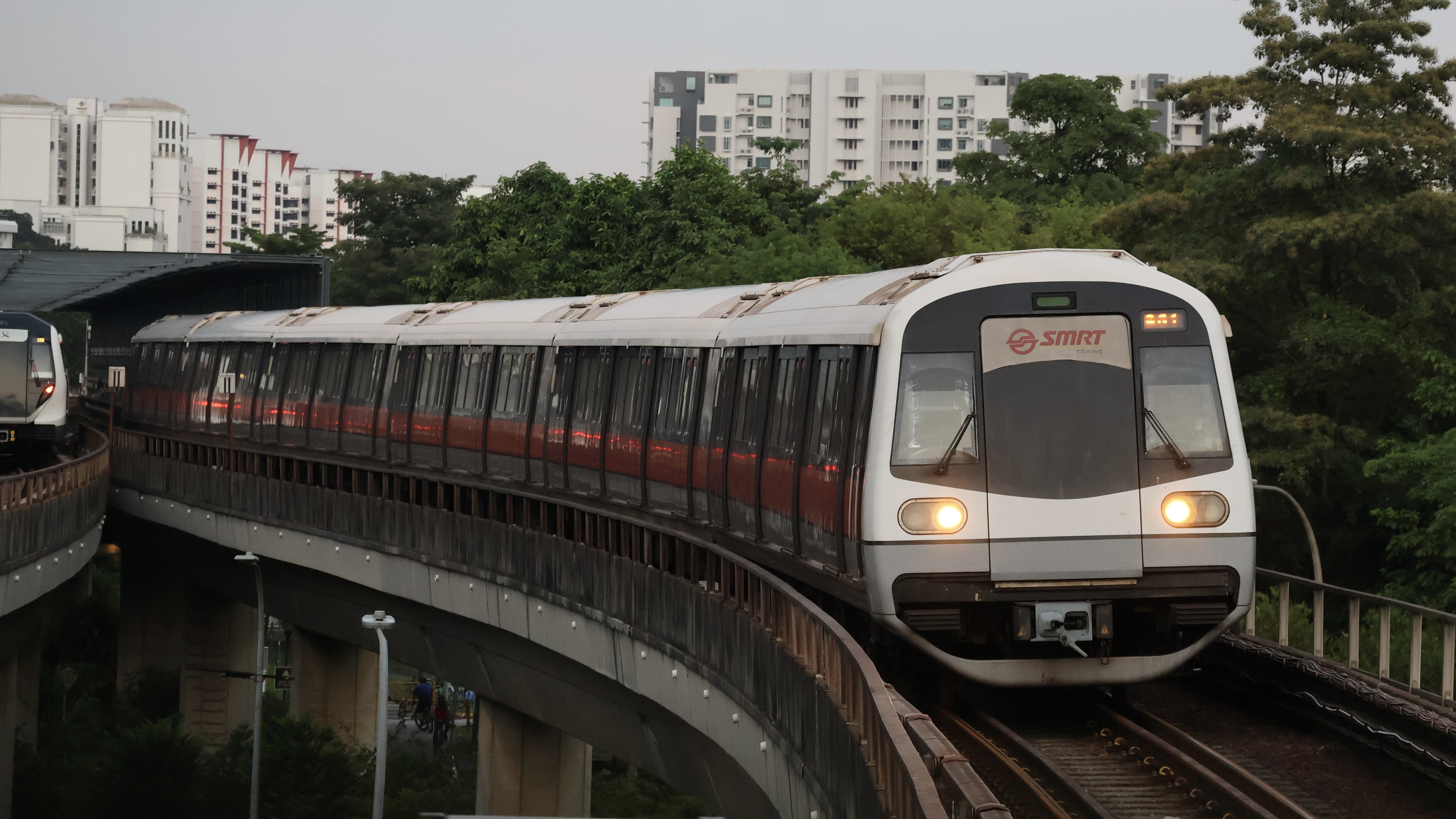
- A C151A train approaching Boon Lay station, 2024

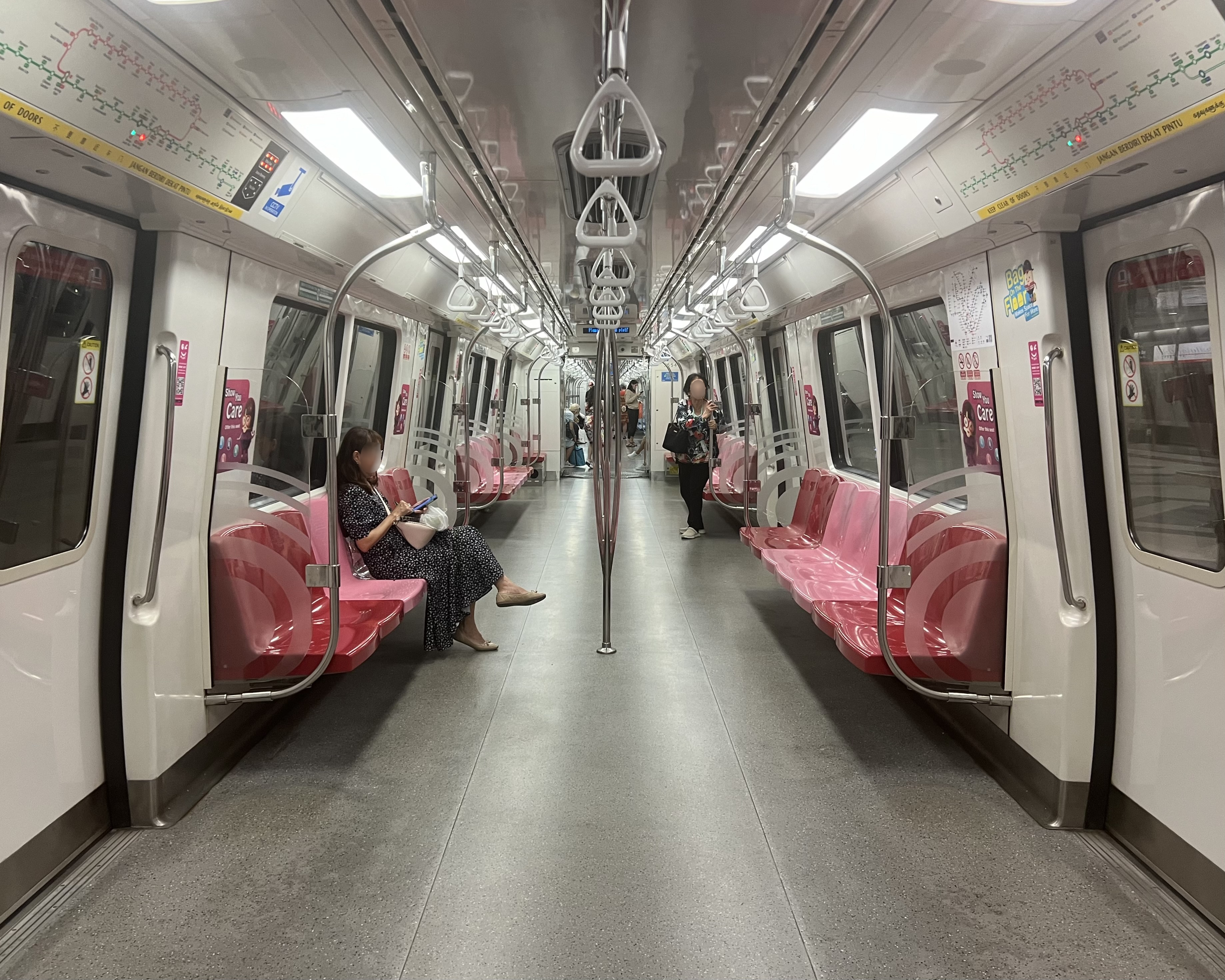
- Interior of a C151A train.
- Stock type: Electric multiple unit
- In service: 27 May 2011; 15 years ago – present
- Manufacturers: Kawasaki; CRRC Qingdao Sifang
- Built at: Qingdao, Shandong, China
- Constructed: 2011 (Batch 1); 2013 – 2014 (Batch 2)
- Entered service: 27 May 2011; 15 years ago
- Refurbished: CRRC Qingdao Sifang; 2026 – mid-2030s
- Number built: 210 Vehicles (35 Sets)
- Number in service: 210 Vehicles (35 Sets)
- Formation: 6 per trainset DT–M1–M2+M2–M1–DT
- Fleet numbers: 501/502 – 543/544 (Batch 1); 545/546 – 569/570 (Batch 2)
- Capacity: 296 seated; 1,624 standing; 2 PIW spaces
- Operator: SMRT Trains (SMRT Corporation)
- Depots: Bishan; Ulu Pandan; Tuas; East Coast
- Lines served: North–South Line; East–West Line

Specifications
- Car body construction: Aluminium-alloy double-skinned construction
- Train length: 138.86 m (455 ft 6 7/8 in)
- Car length: 23.83 m (78 ft 2 in) (DT); 22.8 m (74 ft 10 in) (M)
- Width: 3.2 m (10 ft 6 in)
- Height: 3.7 m (12 ft 2 in)
- Doors: 1,450 mm (57 1/8 in), 8 per car, 4 per side
- Maximum speed: 90 km/h (56 mph) (design); 80 km/h (50 mph) (service)
- Weight: 226.8 t (223.2 long tons; 250.0 short tons) (unladen); 335.9 t (330.6 long tons; 370.3 short tons) (laden)
- Traction system: Fuji Electric IGBT–VVVF (output 415 kVA)
- Traction motors: 16 × Fuji Electric MLR111 150 kW (201 hp) self-ventilated 3-phase AC induction motor 550V 204A 1765 r/min
- Power output: 2.4 MW (3,218 hp)
- Transmission: Westinghouse-Natal (WN) Drive
- Acceleration: 1 m/s^{2} (2.2 mph/s)
- Deceleration: 1.2 m/s^{2} (2.7 mph/s) (service); 1.3 m/s^{2} (2.9 mph/s) (emergency)
- Auxiliaries: Fuji Electric auxiliary inverter with battery charger 80 kVA + 16 kW
- Electric systems: 750 V DC third rail
- Current collection: Collector shoe
- UIC classification: 2′2′+Bo′Bo′+Bo′Bo′+Bo′Bo′+Bo′Bo′+2′2′
- Bogies: bolsterless air-spring monolink axlebox type
- Braking systems: Regenerative, rheostatic and electro-pneumatic
- Safety systems: Original: Westinghouse Brake and Signal Company FS2000 ATP fixed block ATC under ATO GoA 2 (STO), with subsystems of ATP and ATS; Current: Thales SelTrac® moving block CBTC ATC under ATO GoA 3 (DTO), with subsystems of ATP, NetTrac ATS and CBI
- Coupling system: Scharfenberg
- Track gauge: 1,435 mm (4 ft 8 1/2 in) standard gauge

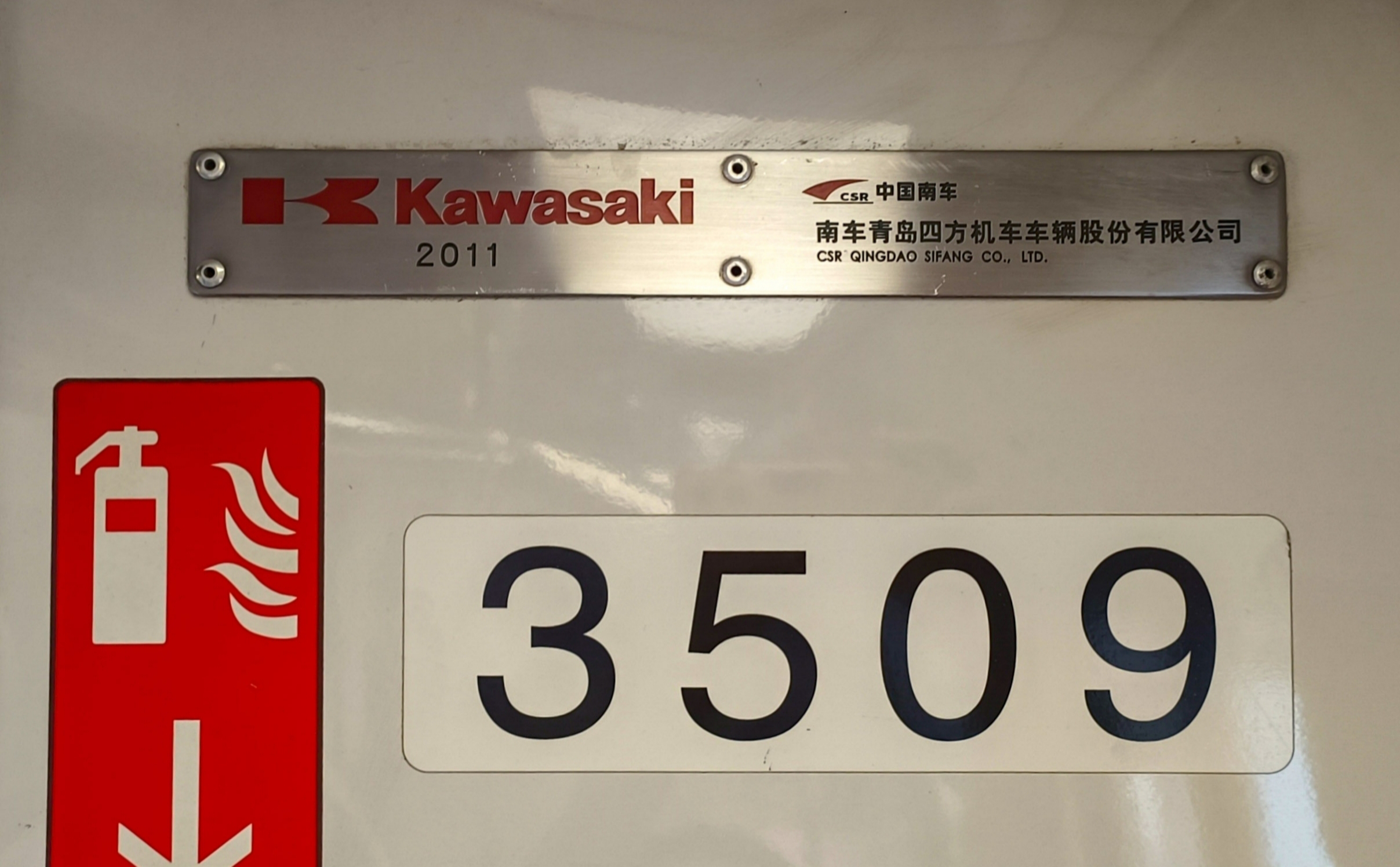
Builder's plate of a C151A train

The Kawasaki Heavy Industries & CSR Qingdao Sifang C151A is a class of trains that are the fourth generation electric multiple unit rolling stock in operation on the existing North–South (NSL) and East–West (EWL) lines of Singapore's Mass Rapid Transit (MRT) system, manufactured by Kawasaki Heavy Industries (KHI) and CRRC Qingdao Sifang under Contract 151A. Their introduction to the network has increased the capacity of both lines by 15%.

They are the last batch of rolling stock on the two lines to be painted in the "Blackbird" livery. Developed from the Kawasaki Heavy Industries & Nippon Sharyo C751B trainsets, further developments of the type include the C151B and C151C trains featuring design updates and changes. The C151A was the first rolling stock on the MRT network to be manufactured in China. The initial contract of 22 trainsets of 6 cars each was awarded to KHI and Sifang by the Land Transport Authority.

In 2013, a further order of 13 trainsets was placed, with all 35 trainsets in revenue service as of 2014. In 2016, an investigative news report from Hong Kong's FactWire alleged that C151A trainsets were discreetly being shipped back to Qingdao for rectification due to multiple defects, including an exploding battery and cracks on trains. The Singapore government subsequently acknowledged the trains were returned for rectification works, and have since published official statements to address FactWire's specific allegations.

== History ==
C151A for the supply of 22 trainsets for the North South and East West lines were initiated for expansion of the fleet in December 2007 as 106 trains were deemed insufficient for the extension to Joo Koon and the Jurong East Modification Project. On 6 May 2009, the Land Transport Authority announced that KHI and Sifang had won over Hyundai Rotem, Bombardier Transportation and Mitsubishi Heavy Industries to secure the contract at a cost of S$369 million, despite Hyundai Rotem offering the lowest bid at S$323 million for the order of 22 trainsets under Batch 1. Sifang handled the manufacturing and testing of the rolling stock, while KHI oversaw the project and design. The C151A contract was the first successful joint venture between these two companies in the international market. Also, in December 2011, 13 additional trains were purchased by LTA under Variation Order bringing the total number of trains to 35.

With the delivery of C151A trainsets, trains were actually operated on the East–West Line until October 2013. C151As were temporarily suspended from the North–South Line during the MRT disruption in 2011, starting from 7 May 2012 all the way until 23 October 2013. SMRT engineers detected arcing problems on one of the C151As, but no evidence was shown that it was the root cause of the service suspension in 2015.

During the suspension of the C151A running on the North–South Line, SMRT had investigated and found impurities in aluminium bodywork caused the cracks found in structural components, including the sub-floor, which is a compartment located under passenger floor. Its role is to hold equipment box and electrical wires and bolster function parts connecting the car body to the bogie. Affected trainsets were sent back to China progressively between July 2014 and January 2020, before the COVID-19 pandemic.

=== Refurbishment ===
All 92 trains from the KSF fleet, consisting of C151As, C151Bs and C151Cs will undergo refurbishment works from 2026 onwards, and is expected to be completed by the mid-2030s.

== Tender ==
The tender for trains under the contract turnkey 151A was closed in January 2009. The tender results were published in May 2009.

S/N	Name of Tenderer	Amount (S$)
1	Bombardier (Singapore) Pte Ltd and Bombardier Transportation GmbH Consortium	373,327,788.00
2	Kawasaki Heavy Industries / Kawasaki Heavy Industries (Singapore) / CSR Qingdao Sifang Locomotive and Rolling Stock	368,997,888.00
3	Mitsubishi Corporation	393,301,698.52
4	Hyundai Rotem	322,729,548.00

== Operational problems ==
On 5 July 2016, a Hong Kong-based non-profit news organization FactWire had broken the news of the C151A trains suffering from multiple defects relating to Chinese-made materials and posted the entire investigative works on YouTube.

=== Reactions ===
This incident was a source of public concern among Hong Kongers because subway operator MTR had ordered fleets of a new train from the same manufacturer CRRC Sifang. The news was quickly reported in other Hong Kong media. The incident also created a public uproar in Singapore, generating a public reaction. Some of these discussions included criticism of the Land Transport Authority (LTA) and SMRT for the cover-up about the defective trains, while others questioned the quality of the Chinese-made trains. The LTA released more technical details on 6 July 2016 claiming that 5 of the 26 defective trains had been rectified, including photos illustrating the 'hair-line crack'. The authority also named an independent third-party assessor, TUV Rheinland who shared the same opinion that the defects are "not safety-critical".

During the same period, a rumour posted on 4 February 2015 alleging misconduct of CRRC Sifang faking technical data involving almost 70 people from multiple departments since November 2010 for failing to meet the standards set by Kawasaki gained traction amongst the public. The consortium refuted the rumor on 7 July 2016 and threatened to take legal actions. The LTA also publicly dismissed the allegations in a press statement. The link to the original rumor was deleted soon after the response from the authorities. On 7 July 2016, the LTA also stated that "no brackets were added at any time to the underframe" in order to refute a subsequent FactWire report claim. LTA also stated that it "considered that the contractor was able to quickly identify the cause of the defects, take responsibility and carry out the necessary action promptly to rectify the fault" and gave the consortium the "highest quality score" as the basis for awarded them subsequent train contracts (C151C and T251) in 2015 despite the defects were discovered since.

On 9 July 2016, a Singapore-based alternative media republished a CaiXin Online article originally published in March 2016 by the China Railway Construction Corporation blaming the China Railway Corporation for the decline of quality standards. According to the former, 60% of all railway incidents in China and 90% of all railway disruptions during 2015 can be attributed to CRRC manufactured trains not meeting quality or maintenance standards, with 210 instances resulting in death or injuries. The equivalent of the English article is also provided by CaiXin Online as well.

== Incidents ==
On 15 November 2017 at approximately 8.18am, two C151A trains, 535/536 and 547/548, collided at Joo Koon MRT station. The collision resulted in 38 injuries, including two SMRT Trains staff members. It was the second train collision in Singapore MRT's history, after the Clementi rail accident.
