= Kawasaki Heavy Industries & CSR Qingdao Sifang C151B =

Class of electric multiple units in Singapore

Kawasaki Heavy Industries & CRRC Qingdao Sifang C151B
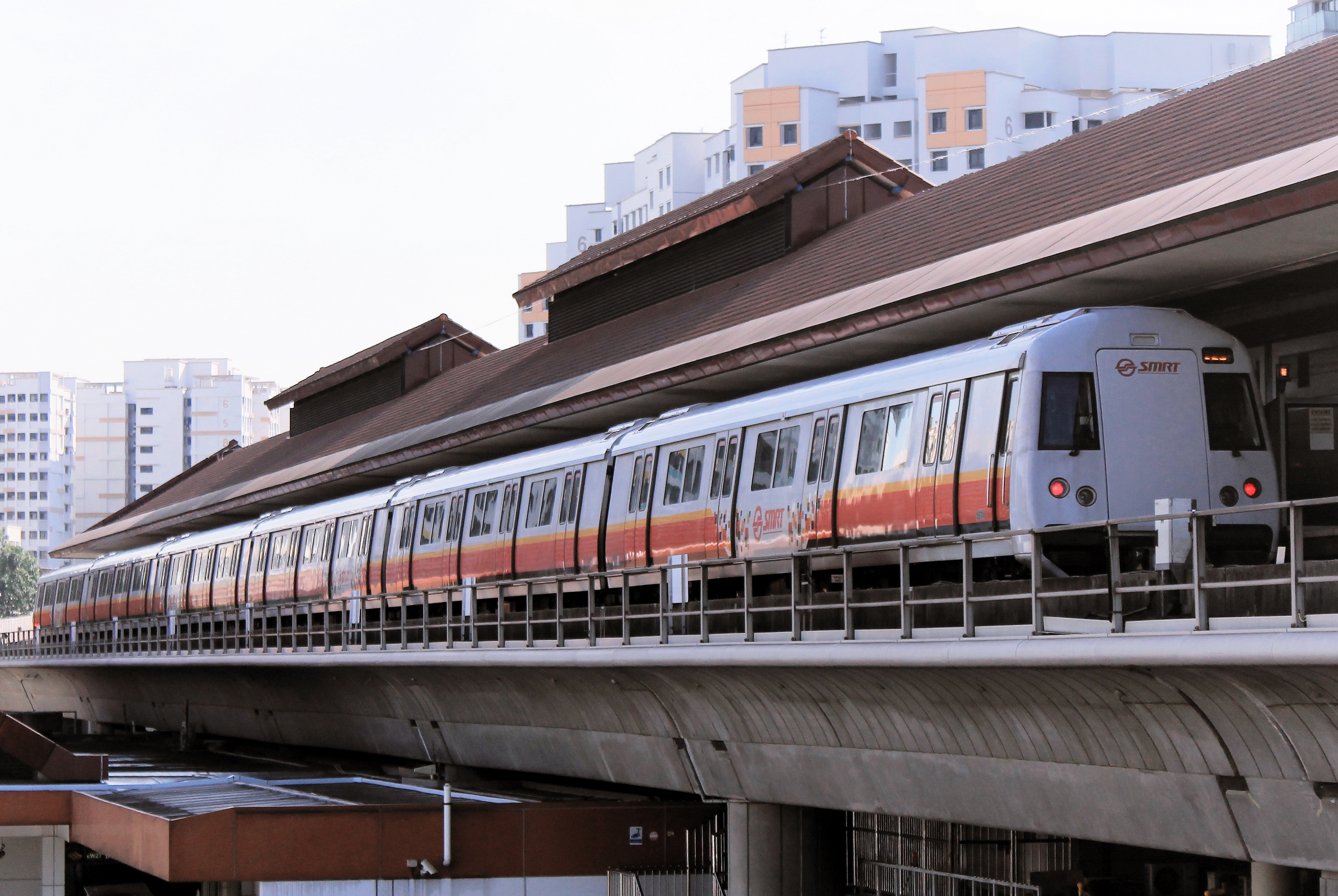
- A C151B train on the East–West Line

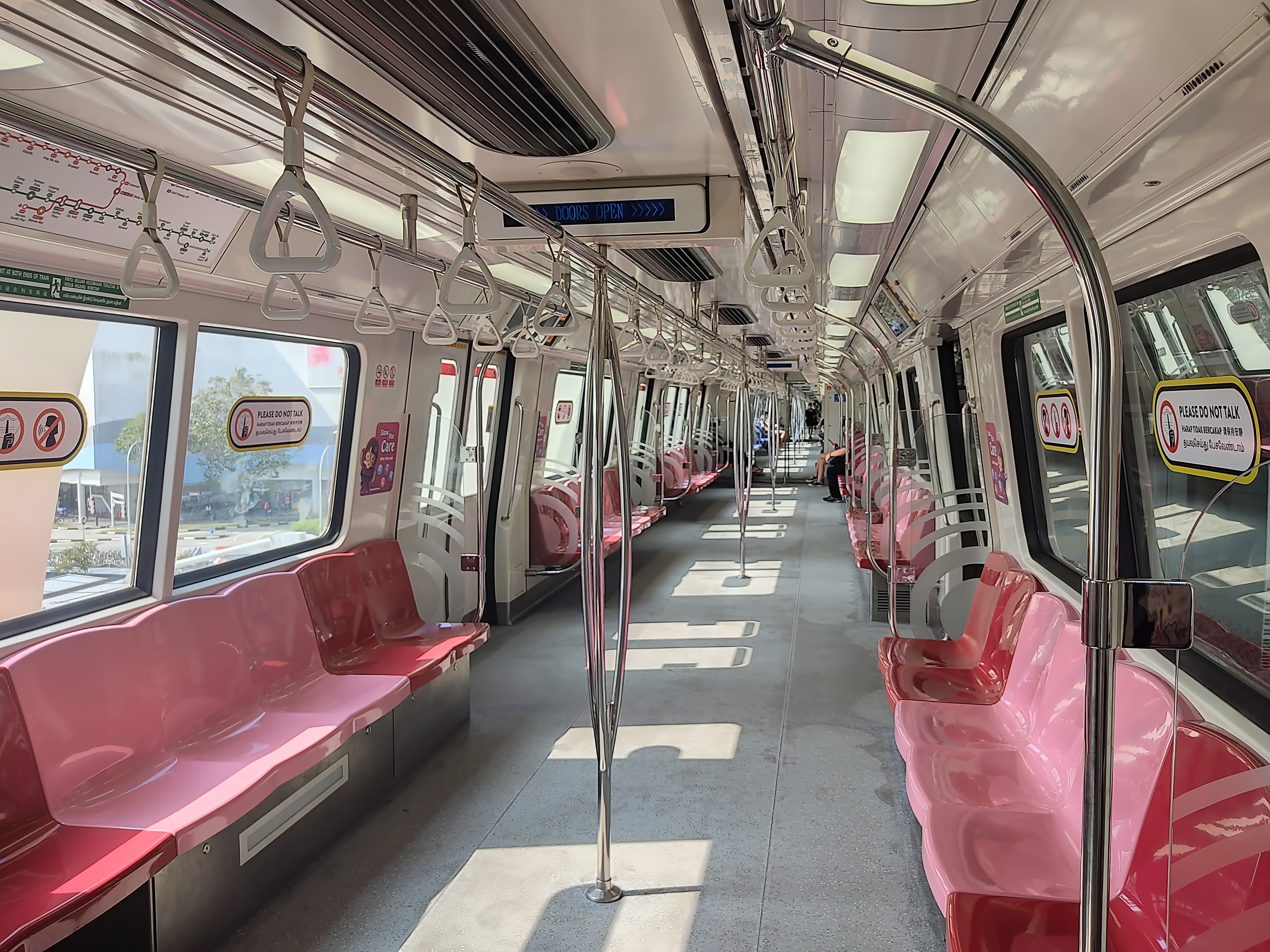
- Interior of a C151B train.
- Stock type: Electric multiple unit
- In service: 16 April 2017; 9 years ago – present
- Manufacturers: Kawasaki; CRRC Qingdao Sifang
- Built at: Qingdao, Shandong, China
- Constructed: 2015 – 2016 (Batch 1); 2016 – 2017 (Batch 2 & 3)
- Entered service: 16 April 2017; 9 years ago
- Refurbished: CRRC Qingdao Sifang; 2025 – mid-2030s
- Number built: 270 vehicles (45 sets)
- Number in service: 264 vehicles (44 sets)
- Formation: 6 per trainset DT–M1–M2+M2–M1–DT
- Fleet numbers: 601/602 – 643/644 (Batch 1); 645/646 – 669/670 (Batch 2); 671/672 – 689/690 (Batch 3)
- Capacity: 1920 passengers
- Operator: SMRT Trains Ltd (SMRT Corporation)
- Depots: Bishan; Ulu Pandan; Tuas; East Coast
- Lines served: North–South Line; East–West Line

Specifications
- Car body construction: Aluminium-alloy double-skinned construction
- Train length: 138.86 m (455 ft 6 7/8 in)
- Car length: 23.83 m (78 ft 2 in) (DT); 22.8 m (74 ft 10 in) (M)
- Width: 3.2 m (10 ft 6 in)
- Height: 3.7 m (12 ft 1 5/8 in)
- Doors: 1,450 mm (57 1/8 in), 8 per car, 4 per side
- Maximum speed: 90 km/h (56 mph) (design); 80 km/h (50 mph) (service)
- Traction system: Fuji Electric IGBT–VVVF (output 415 kVA)
- Traction motors: 16 × Fuji Electric MLR111 150 kW (201 hp) self-ventilated 3-phase AC induction motor 550V 204A 1765 r/min
- Power output: 2.4 MW (3,218 hp)
- Acceleration: 1 m/s^{2} (2.2 mph/s)
- Deceleration: 1.2 m/s^{2} (2.7 mph/s) (service); 1.3 m/s^{2} (2.9 mph/s) (emergency)
- Auxiliaries: Fuji Electric auxiliary inverter with battery charger 80 kVA + 16 kW
- Electric systems: 750 V DC third rail
- Current collection: Collector shoe
- UIC classification: 2′2′+Bo′Bo′+Bo′Bo′+Bo′Bo′+Bo′Bo′+2′2′
- Safety systems: Thales SelTrac® moving block CBTC ATC under ATO GoA 3 (DTO), with subsystems of ATP, NetTrac ATS and CBI
- Coupling system: Scharfenberg
- Track gauge: 1,435 mm (4 ft 8 1/2 in) standard gauge

The Kawasaki Heavy Industries & CSR Qingdao Sifang C151B is a class of trains that are the fifth generation electric multiple unit rolling stock in operation on the existing North–South (NSL) and East–West (EWL) lines of Singapore's Mass Rapid Transit (MRT) system, manufactured by Kawasaki Heavy Industries (KHI) and CRRC Qingdao Sifang under Contract 151B. 45 trains were purchased and all of them have been delivered to Singapore as of 12 April 2017. SMRT took delivery of the first 2 train cars on 21 May 2015. These trains increased frequency for the two MRT lines, North–South and East–West lines.

These trains retain the same IGBT-VVVF traction equipment found on the earlier C751B and C151A sets, also featuring SMRT's "Pixels" livery introduced on the Bukit Panjang LRT C801A, and was going to be on the refurbished C651 trains, until the project was cancelled in 2018. These trains are the first to be fitted with STARiS (SMRT Active Route Map Information System) 2.0, which is embedded in the door's overhead panels, as factory stock and also the first amongst the rolling stock used on the North–South and East–West lines to have electric door actuators rather than the traditional pneumatic door actuators on previous generations of rolling stock, allowing smoother and more reliable door operations, reducing delays. The first C151B train (EMU 601/602) made its debut on the North–South Line on 16 April 2017.

Although there were some C151Bs housed in Tuas Depot since the inception of the Tuas West Extension, the C151Bs did not begin revenue service on the full-stretch of the East–West line only until 6 May 2018, when the line switched to the new signalling system. Before that, the C151Bs running on the EWL only ran on the Tuas West Extension between Gul Circle and Tuas Link as it was the only section that had the new signalling system installed. On 27 May 2018, with the complete transition to the new signalling system, all 45 C151B trains have entered service on the North–South and East–West lines.

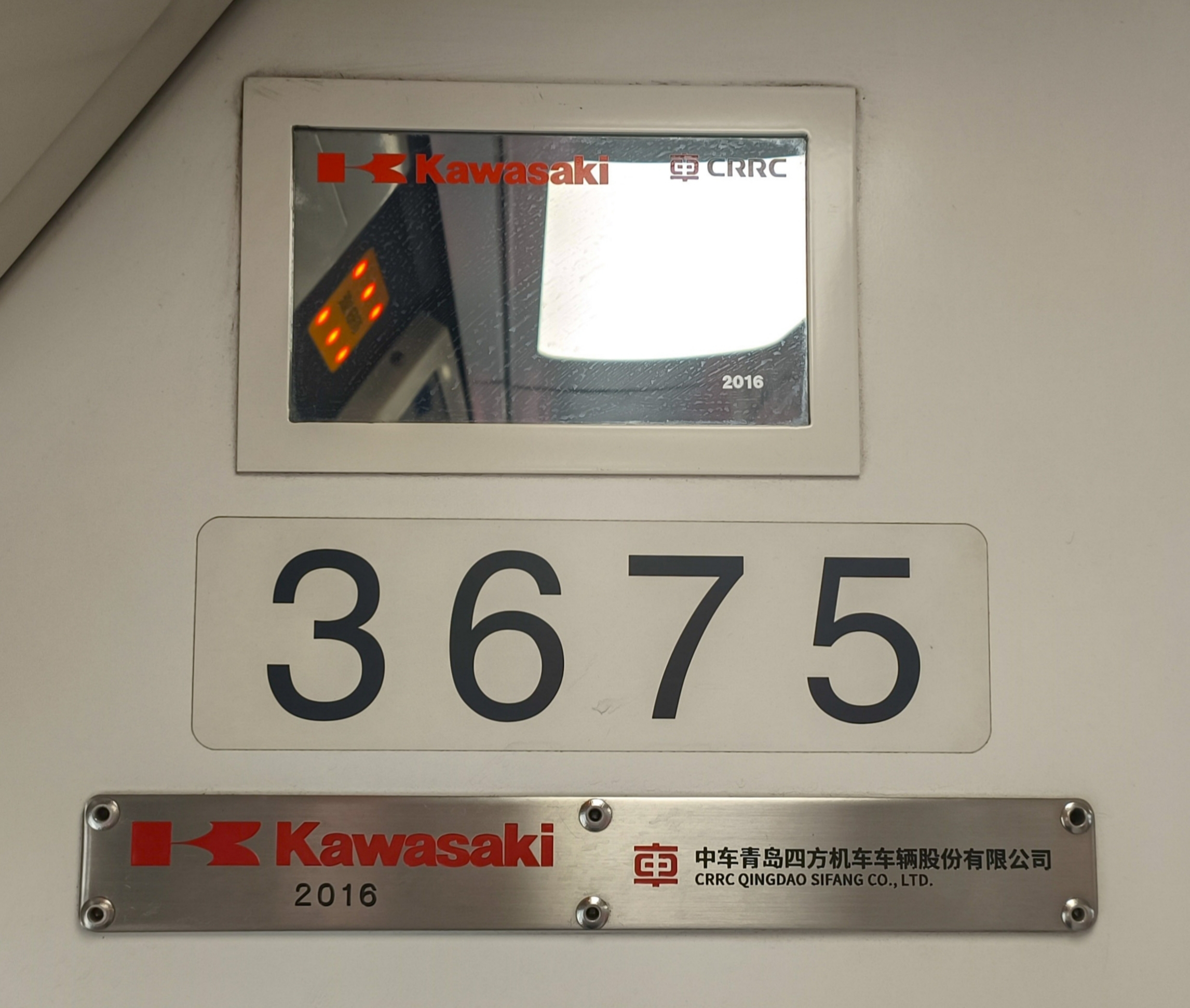
Builder's plate of a C151B train

== Refurbishment ==
On 6 November 2024, SMRT announced that, in collaboration with CRRC Qingdao Sifang, one C151B train will be upgraded as a proof-of-concept. Condition Monitoring (CM) and Structural Health Monitoring (SHM) systems will be retrofitted to allow for preventive maintenance, as well as refurbishment of the Train Information and Management System (TIMS) and air-conditioning system.

EMU 649/650, known as the Prognostic Health Monitoring (PHM) train, was the first of the C151B fleet to be sent back to CRRC in China for retrofitting and refurbishment works. Works were completed around September 2025 with the train returning to Singapore in October 2025, notably without the pixel livery. The PHM train re-entered service on 21 June 2026, bearing a new red-and-white exterior livery.

92 trains consisting of C151As, C151Bs and C151Cs will undergo refurbishment works from 2026 onwards, and is expected to be completed by the mid-2030s.

== Tender ==
In the turnkey Contract C151B, three tenderers were shortlisted – Kawasaki Heavy Industries Ltd/Kawasaki Heavy Industries (Singapore) Pte Ltd Consortium, CRRC Zhuzhou/Siemens, and Construcciones y Auxiliar de Ferrocarriles. On 23 August 2013, the Land Transport Authority (LTA) awarded the tender to Kawasaki Heavy Industries at a price of S$281,508,884.00. Subsequently, the tender results were released to the public on 27 August 2013.

S/N	Name of Tenderer	Amount (S$)
1	CSR Zhuzhou Electric Locomotive Co., Ltd. / Siemens Pte Ltd, Singapore Consortium	272,906.709.00
2	Kawasaki Heavy Industries Ltd/Kawasaki Heavy Industries (Singapore) Pte Ltd Consortium CRRC Qingdao Sifang	281,508,884.00
3	Construcciones y Auxiliar de Ferrocarriles	282,089,106.58

== Manufacturing process ==
Kawasaki will be responsible for the overall project management, design, manufacturing of bogies and procurement of major components. CRRC Sifang will be in charge of manufacturing, final fitting and assembly of complete MRT trains and factory testing. Kawasaki (Singapore) will be responsible for the delivery of complete MRT trains to the depot, on-site testing and commissioning. The MRT trains were delivered to Singapore from 2015 onwards.
