= East Coast Depot =

East Coast Depot may refer to:

- The East Coast Depot on Malaysian rail operator Keretapi Tanah Melayu's network.
- East Coast Integrated Depot, a bus and train depot in Singapore
