= East–West Line (Singapore) =

Mass Rapid Transit line in Singapore

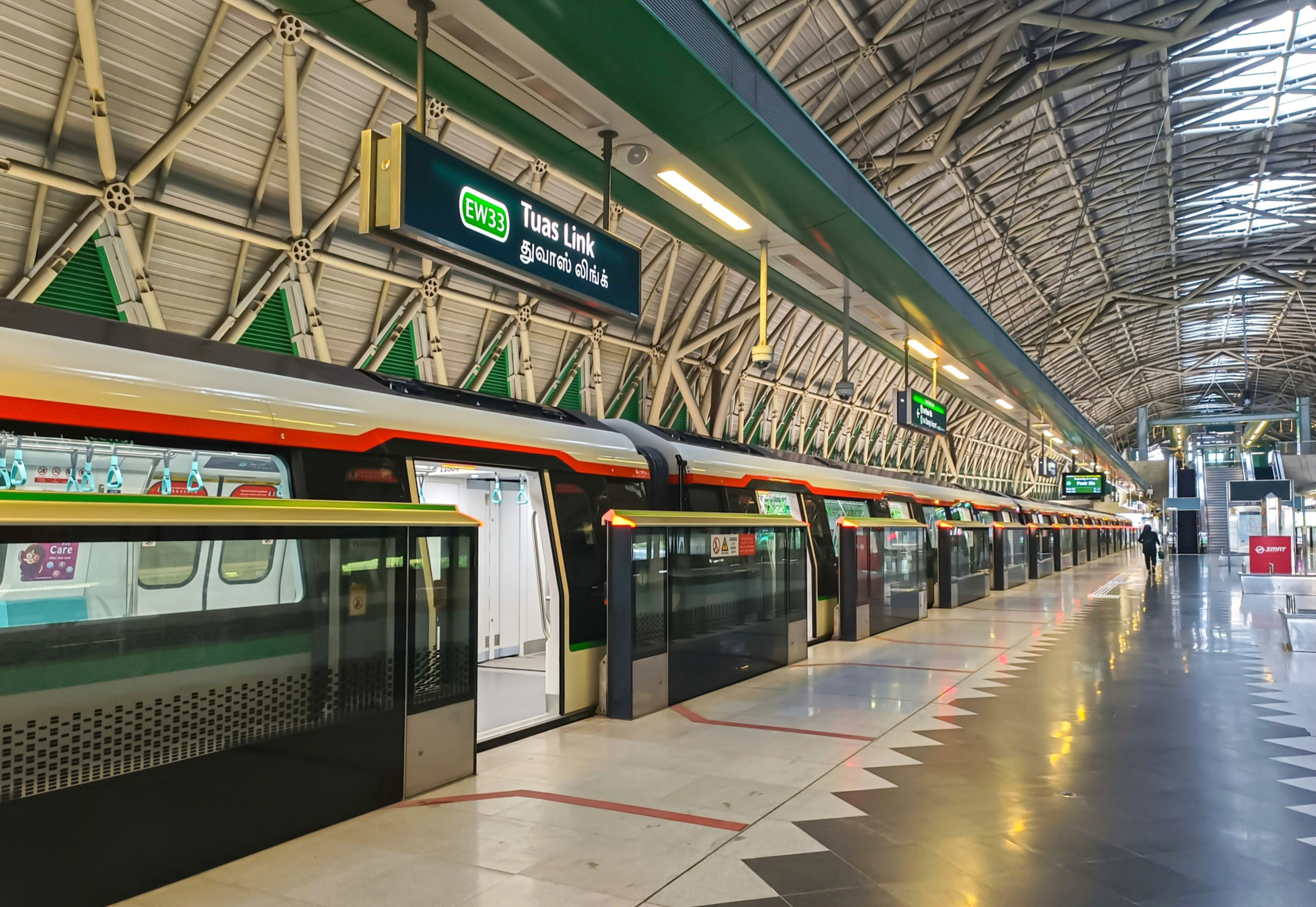
- An R151 Train at the platform of Tuas Link station, the western terminus of the line

Overview
- Native name: Malay: Laluan MRT Timur Barat; Chinese: 东西地铁线; Tamil: கிழக்கு-மேற்கு ரயில் பாதை
- Status: Operational
- Owner: Land Transport Authority
- Line number: EW
- Locale: Singapore
- Termini: Pasir Ris Tanah Merah; Tuas Link Changi Airport
- Stations: 35
- Colour on map: Green (#009645)

Service
- Type: Rapid transit
- System: Mass Rapid Transit (Singapore)
- Services: 3
- Operator: SMRT Trains (SMRT Corporation)
- Depot(s): Ulu Pandan; Tuas; East Coast
- Rolling stock: Kawasaki–Sifang C151A (KSF A); Kawasaki–Sifang C151B (KSF B); Kawasaki–Sifang C151C (KSF C); Alstom Movia R151 (ALS)
- Daily ridership: 508,957 (July 2020)

History
- Opened: 12 December 1987; 38 years ago
- Last extension: 2017

Technical
- Line length: 57.2 km (35.5 mi)
- Track length: 57.2 km (35.5 mi)
- Character: Elevated (Pasir Ris – Kallang, Redhill – Tuas Link, Expo); Underground (Lavender – Tiong Bahru, Changi Airport)
- Track gauge: 1,435 mm (4 ft 8 1/2 in) standard gauge
- Electrification: 750 V DC third rail
- Operating speed: limit of 80 km/h (50 mph)
Maps
Interactive Map

The East–West Line (EWL) is a high-capacity Mass Rapid Transit (MRT) line operated by SMRT in Singapore, running from Pasir Ris station in the east to Tuas Link station in the west, with an additional branch between Changi Airport and Tanah Merah stations. It is the second Mass Rapid Transit line to be built in Singapore. Coloured green on the rail map, the line serves 35 stations, eight of which (all stations from Lavender to Tiong Bahru, as well as Changi Airport) are underground. At 57.2 kilometres (35.5 mi), the line is the longest on the MRT network.

Constructed and opened as part of the North–South Line (NSL) in the early stages of development, the East–West Line was the second rail line formed in Singapore after NSL, with the opening of the eastern extension to Tanah Merah on the EWL in 1989. Nevertheless, both lines use identical signalling equipment and rolling stock. The East–West Line signalling systems have been upgraded along with the North–South Line, with both MRT lines having its signalling fully upgraded, converting it from semi-automatic to fully automatic.

== History ==
=== Initial developments ===
The first segment of what would become the East–West Line, between City Hall and Outram Park stations, was opened on 12 December 1987 as part of the North–South Line and Phase 1 of the initial system. Subsequently, it was extended westwards to Clementi station on 12 March 1988 and to Lakeside on 5 November 1988.

The 15-kilometre (9.3 mi) eastern extension to Tanah Merah station opened on 4 November 1989, which also marked the start of independent operations as the East–West Line. The opening ceremony was attended by then First Deputy Prime Minister Goh Chok Tong.

The 6-kilometre (3.7 mi) line extension to Pasir Ris station was opened ahead of schedule on 16 December 1989 with a sneak preview beforehand. Boon Lay station opened on 6 July 1990, marking the completion of the initial MRT system.

=== Subsequent developments ===
==== Dover station ====
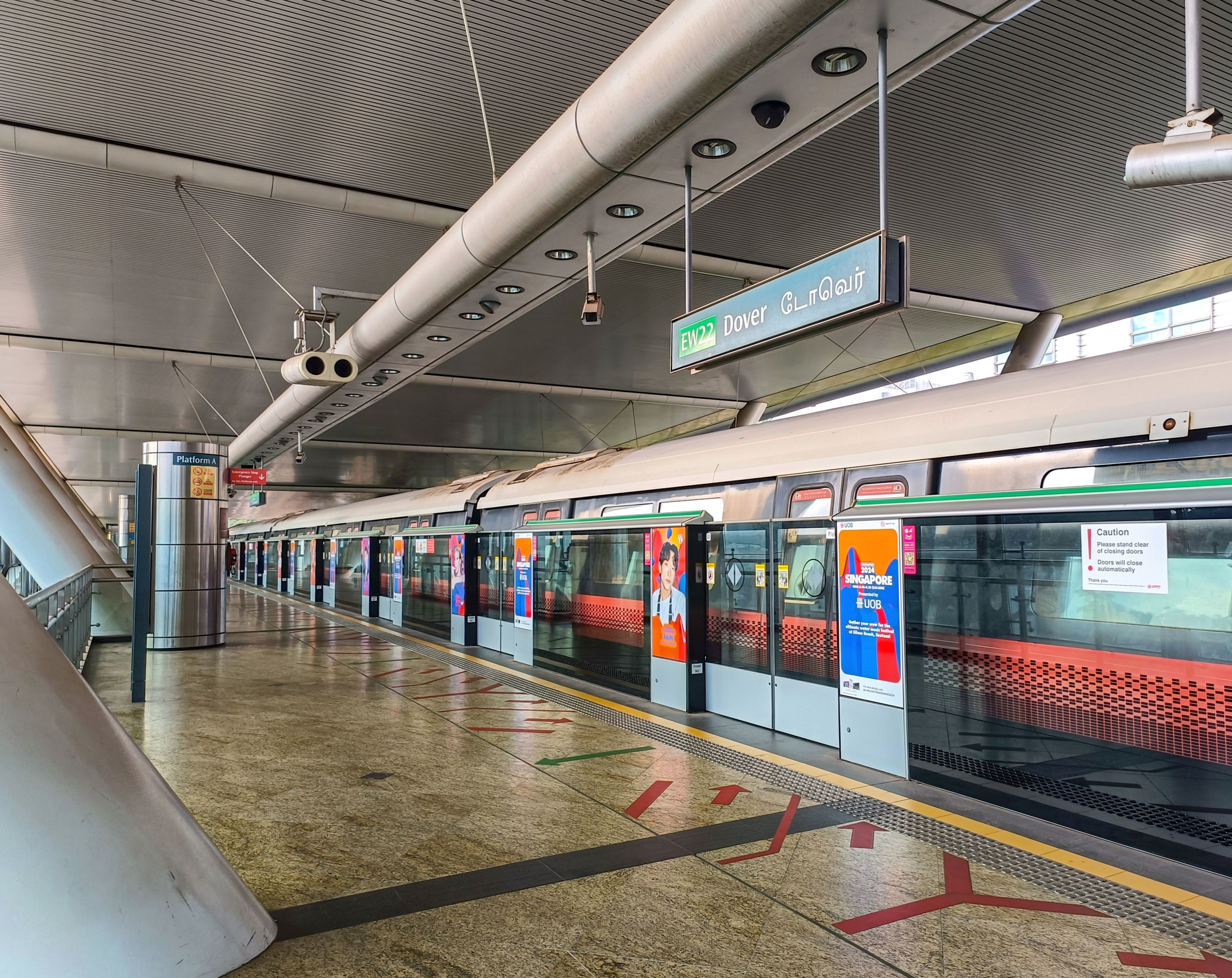
Dover station

Construction on a new infill station located between Buona Vista station and Clementi station, namely Dover station, began in June 1998. It is the first station in the MRT network to be built as an infill station. The building of the station was met with reservations by some members of the public over the small area it serviced and there were criticisms over the spending of "taxpayers' money" chiefly for use only by students of one educational institution. Despite some opposition, the Land Transport Authority proceeded with the construction to serve commuters along Singapore Polytechnic with Dover housing estate. The station opened on 18 October 2001. Prior to opening, test runs were conducted from 13 to 17 October 2001, where the trains stopped at the station but did not open their doors.

==== Tanah Merah to Airport extension line ====
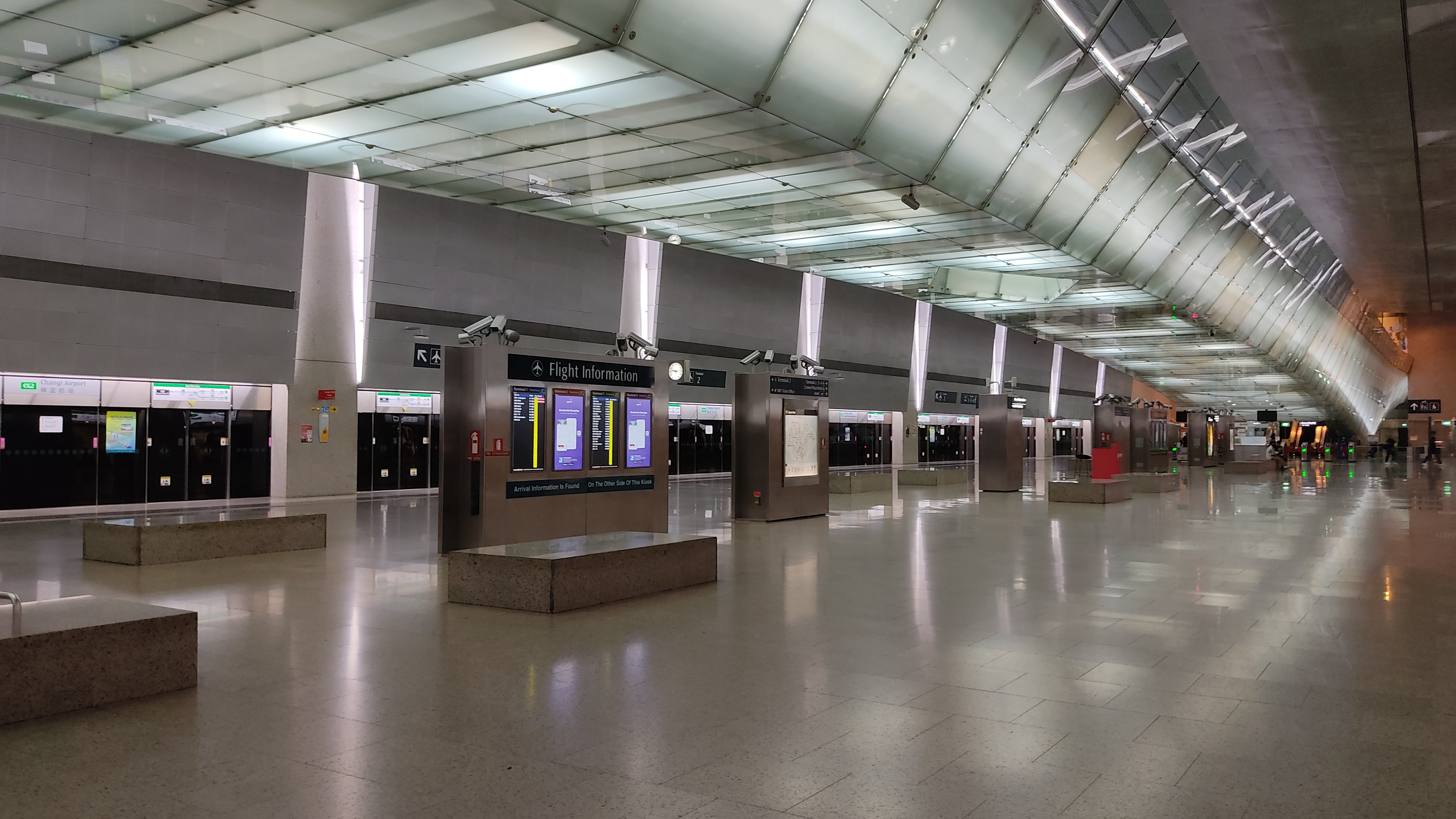
Changi Airport station

The idea of extending the Mass Rapid Transit system to Changi Airport was reconsidered when Terminal 3 of the airport was being built. Earlier plans had long been made for a new line branching off from the existing East–West Line at Tanah Merah, with some conceptual plans showing a tentative route alignment up to the airport along Airport Boulevard, continuing beyond the airport to Changi Point, before turning southwest back towards the city along the eastern coasts. The plans were finally announced by then Deputy Prime Minister Lee Hsien Loong on 15 November 1996. However, the new route alignment showed a deviation from previous plans, where the final plan involved in building only the first two stations of Expo, and Changi Airport, the latter being the underground station built between Terminal 2 and Terminal 3. The alignment of the station at the airport also switched perpendicularly to an east–west direction, such that the station leads to two of the terminals directly from either end of the station. The station's designs were unveiled on 10 February 1998 with construction starting on 29 January 1999. Expo and Changi Airport were opened on 10 January 2001 and 8 February 2002 respectively and operates under a shuttle service. Prior to 22 July 2003, train services from Boon Lay commences after the opening, but were later reverted to shuttle services due to low patronage. On 25 May 2019, it was announced that the Changi Airport Extension would be converted to become part of Thomson–East Coast Line Extension (TELe) by 2040.

==== Boon Lay and Tuas extension ====
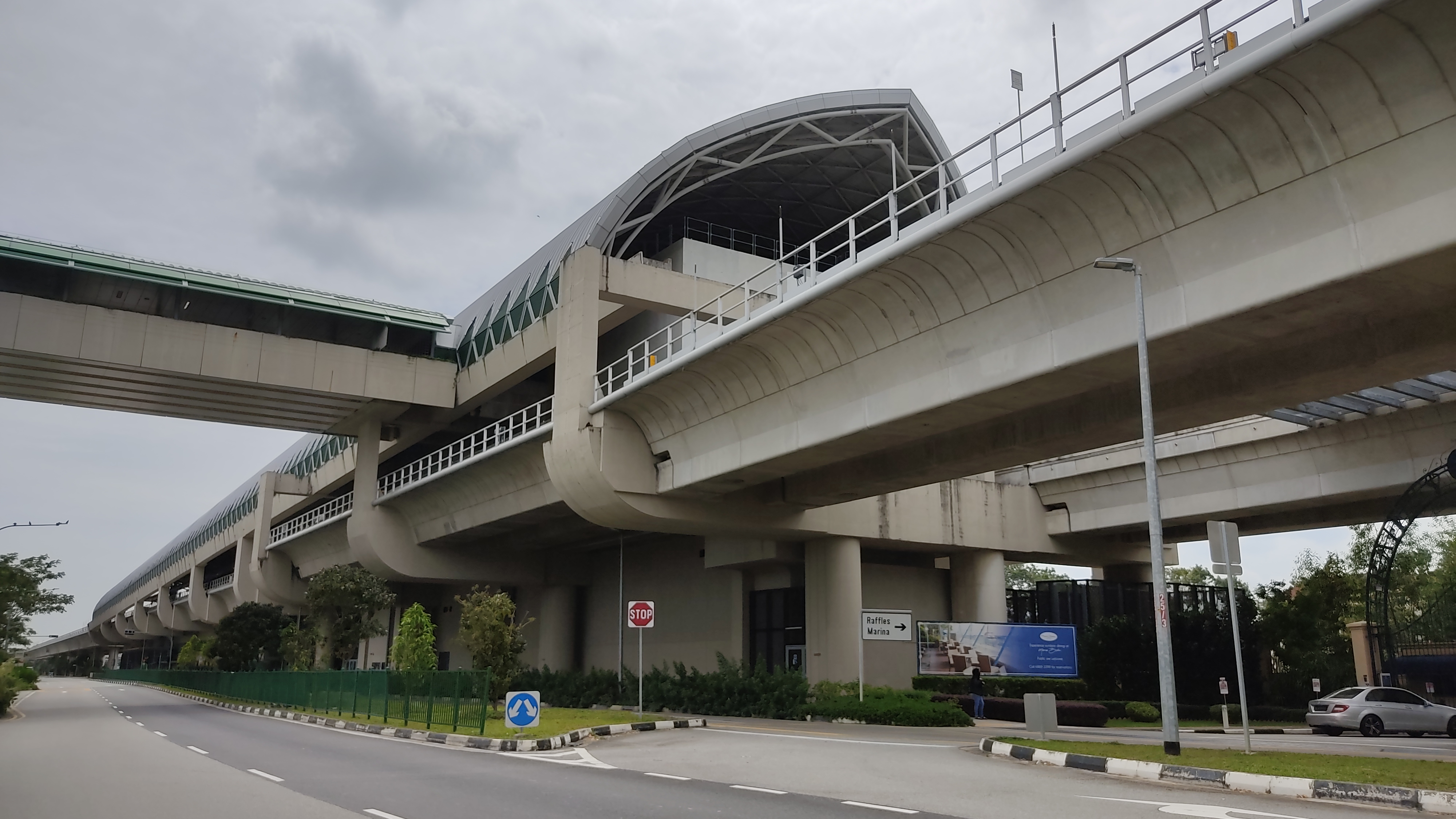
Tuas Link station

The 3.8-kilometre (2.4 mi) Boon Lay extension was first announced by the LTA on 29 December 2004, set to serve residents from the Jurong West Town area and those working in the Jurong Industrial Estate. The two stations, Pioneer and Joo Koon stations, officially opened on 28 February 2009.

On 11 January 2011, the Tuas West extension, an extension of the East–West Line from Joo Koon to Tuas Link was announced. The extension has a span of 7.5 kilometres (4.7 mi), which spans a twin-tracked MRT viaduct, four above-ground stations and a 26-hectare (64-acre) depot to provide stabling and maintenance facilities for the additional trains that will be bought for the extension and to cater for future expansion of the line. The viaduct is integrated with part of a 4.8-kilometre-long (3.0 mi) road viaduct along Pioneer Road, which will increase the road capacity to cope with anticipated increase in traffic. The stations are Gul Circle, Tuas Crescent, Tuas West Road, and Tuas Link. On 4 May 2012, the Land Transport Authority marked the start of construction of the Tuas West extension with a groundbreaking ceremony at the site of the future Tuas Link station.

The extension began service on 18 June 2017. During initial stages after opening, the westbound trains will alternate their terminus between Joo Koon and Tuas Link, where for every two trains, one train will terminate at the former, while the other train will terminate at the latter.

In 2025, the LTA announced that 40 stations on the North–South and East–West lines will gain public artworks, as part of expansion of the Art in Transit programme.

=== Additional platform at Tanah Merah station ===
On 25 August 2014, the Land Transport Authority announced that a new island platform will be constructed at Tanah Merah, enabling faster travel and shorter waiting times for commuters heading towards Expo and Changi Airport on the Changi Airport branch line of the East–West Line.

On 26 October 2016, the Land Transport Authority awarded the civil contract to Lum Chang Building Contractors Pte. Ltd. to build a new platform at Tanah Merah and viaducts for a contract sum of S$325 million. In addition to the new platform, the existing East–West Line tracks will be extended to connect the line to the new four-in-one East Coast Integrated Depot at Changi. When completed in 2025, it will be the second station to have three island platforms side-by-side after Jurong East.

=== Half-height platform screen door installations ===
There were calls for platform screen doors (PSDs) to be installed at above-ground stations after several incidents in which passengers were killed or seriously injured by oncoming trains when they fell onto the railway tracks at above-ground stations. Underground stations already featured the doors since 1987. The authorities initially rejected the proposal by casting doubts over functionality and concerns about the high installation costs, but made an about-turn later with the government announcing plans to install half-height platform screen doors on the elevated stations by 2012 on 25 January 2008, citing lower costs due to it becoming a more common feature worldwide. Contract C1320 for the design and installation of half-height platform screen doors was awarded to Singapore Technologies Electronics Limited in September 2008 for S$112.3 million (US$79.37 million). They were first installed at Jurong East, Pasir Ris, and Yishun stations in 2009 as trial runs. On 31 August 2011, the LTA announced completion of the installation of PSDs along the East–West Line, with Expo being the last station on the line to receive the PSDs. Installation of PSDs across both the North–South and East–West lines (NSEWL) were completed on 14 March 2012, 3 months ahead of schedule.

== Improvement works ==
=== Timber to concrete sleeper replacement works ===
The timber sleepers on the East–West Line were required to be replaced as they were near the end of their 25-year lifespan. The replacement sleepers, made of concrete, have a significantly longer lifespan. To speed up works, train services on the East–West Line was adjusted to end earlier. The work was divided into three phases: Phase 1 (Bugis – Tanah Merah), Phase 2 (Joo Koon – Jurong East, Tanah Merah – Pasir Ris) and Phase 3 (Jurong East – Outram Park). The sleepers were fully replaced on 18 February 2017.

=== Re-signalling works ===
A new moving-block signalling system, supplied by Thales, replaced the former ageing fixed-block signalling system on the East–West Line. The new signalling system, costing $195 million, reduces waiting times for trains during peak periods from 120 to 100 seconds. The new system became operational between Pioneer and Tuas Link stations on 18 June 2017. Newer rolling stocks, such as the C151B and C151C, are equipped for use solely on the new signalling system. Since 27 May 2018, the new signalling system has been operating full-day on the entire East–West Line.

=== Third-rail replacement ===
Replacement works on the third rail, which provides electricity to the trains, were carried out between September 2015 and August 2017. The new third rail replaced its 30-year-old predecessor and is expected to increase reliability of the East–West Line's electrical system.

=== Pasir Ris turnback extension ===
A new railway turnback located at Pasir Ris station, the eastern terminus of the line, was announced by the Land Transport Authority on 29 Jun 2018. It would extend the railway viaduct past the station by 148 metres (486 ft). The turnback will allow for an increase in service frequency during peak times from 30 to 36 trains per hour as trains will be able to change directions faster to head westwards on the line, to meet future increases in ridership demand. Construction started in 2019 and was completed in May 2024.

== Future developments ==
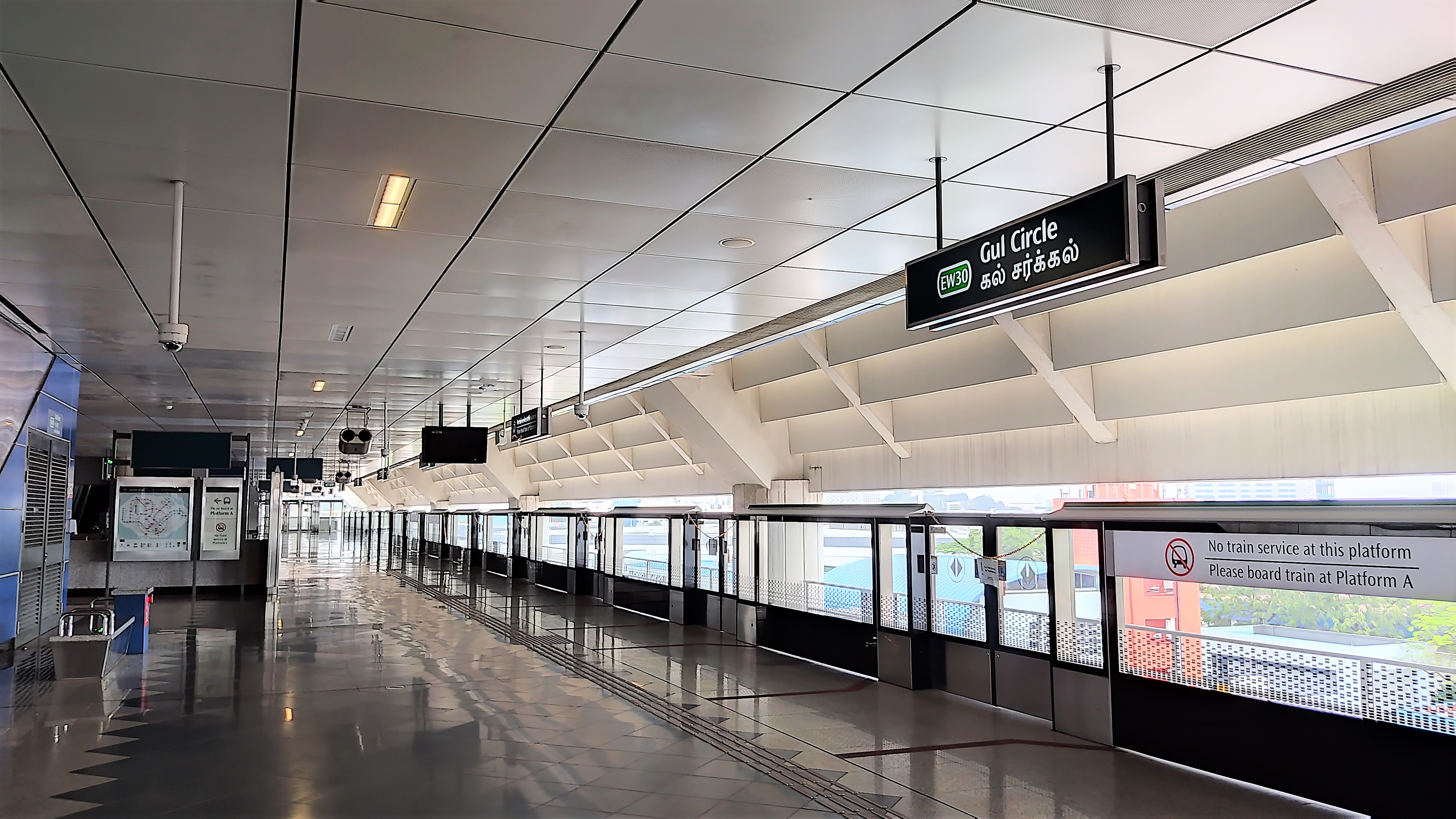
An unused platform at Gul Circle station

=== Changi Airport branch merger with the Thomson–East Coast Line ===
Announced in 2019, the existing branch of the East–West Line between Tanah Merah and Changi Airport will be merged with the Thomson–East Coast Line (TEL) in the mid-2030s, coinciding with the opening of Changi Airport Terminal 5. The line will continue towards a future station at Terminal 5, before meeting the rest of the line at Sungei Bedok. Works to modify the stations on the branch to be compatible with the TEL began in 2025.

=== Tuas South extension ===
Gul Circle station, opened in 2017, features two additional unused platforms to serve a planned extension of the line to Tuas South. Plans for the extension were put on hold by March 2019. By July 2026, the railway extension was deemed unfeasible in the short term, and was succeeded by a planned bus rapid transit network at Tuas South.

== Incidents ==
=== 1993 Clementi train collision ===
On 5 August 1993, before opening, a maintenance vehicle spilt oil on the tracks between Clementi and Jurong East. The first ten eastbound trains reported braking problems, then the eleventh train from Jurong stopped at the Clementi station for two minutes longer than scheduled due to it using its emergency brakes to stop at the station at 7.50 am, before being hit by another eastbound train when it failed to stop in time. 156 passengers were injured by the collision.

=== 7 July 2015 power trip ===
During the evening peak hours on 7 July 2015, train services on the East–West and North–South Lines were temporarily disrupted due to massive power trips detected along both lines. The cause of the disruption was due to damaged insulators which had resulted in the failure of the power supply. For this disruption that brought inconvenience to 413,000 commuters, LTA imposed a 'record' fine of S$5.4 million on SMRT.

=== 22 March 2016 staff fatalities ===
At about 11:08 a.m. on 22 March 2016, two SMRT track-maintenance trainee staff were run over and killed by a C151 train approaching Pasir Ris station, resulting in a temporarily service delay between Tanah Merah and Pasir Ris for over two hours that affected at least 10,000 commuters.

The two trainee staff had joined SMRT in January 2016 and worked as technicians under a technical team of 15 staff led by a supervisor and were tasked to go down to the tracks to investigate an alarm triggered by a possible signalling equipment fault close by the station. An operator cited that they were granted access to the tracks, but did not coordinate with a Signal Unit in the station to ensure trains could not travel in the area where the team was.

Patrick Nathan, SMRT vice-president, promised that "SMRT will review all safety protocols particularly those involving track access". SMRT chief executive Desmond Kuek apologised for the incident and said SMRT will investigate how "the [two men] got hit by the train". SMRT fired both an engineer responsible for leading with the team and the train driver who was involved at the scene of the incident.

The engineer who led the inspection team was charged with negligence causing death under the Penal Code and was subsequently sentenced to 4 weeks in jail. SMRT Trains and one member of SMRT management were charged for violating the Workplace Safety and Health Act for lapses which led to the accident, and were fined $400,000 respectively. and $55,000. On 20 July 2018, the Land Transport Authority fined the operator S$1.9 million (US$1.41 million) for this incident and the Bishan tunnel flooding.

=== 15 November 2017 train collision and disruptions ===
A train collision occurred on 15 November 2017 at approximately 8.18am, where two C151A trains collided at Joo Koon MRT station. A train fault caused the first train heading in the direction of Tuas Link to stall at the station. A minute later, a second train stopped behind the first and then "moved forward unexpectedly," hitting the other train. Thirty-eight people, including two SMRT staff, were hospitalized.

Train services between Tuas Link and Joo Koon stations were temporally suspended in both directions for two hours on the day itself and the entire day on 16 November 2017, and westbound trains temporarily terminated at Joo Koon.

An update by the Land Transport Authority (LTA) and SMRT on 16 November 2017 stated that LTA and SMRT had decided to isolate for up to one month the operations of the Tuas West extension, which runs on the new signalling system, from the rest of the East–West Line, which runs on the old signalling system, enabling LTA engineers to carry out further assurance checks together with Thales. The train was switching systems when the collision took place. Train service on the line resumed on 20 November, with the Tuas West extension between Gul Circle and Tuas Link using the new signalling system and the section between Pasir Ris and Joo Koon, together with the Changi Airport Branch continuing to run on the old signalling system. Train services between Joo Koon and Gul Circle were temporarily suspended until its resumption on 28 May 2018; between the suspension a free bridging bus service is available between the two stations. Continuous service between Pasir Ris and Gul Circle resumed on 28 May 2018, with the permanent activation of the new CBTC system; since the incident, selected portions of either the North–South Line or East–West Line were closed to conduct track renewal works with early weekend closures and later station openings.

=== 25–30 September 2024 train derailment and disruptions ===
Train services between Boon Lay and Queenstown were suspended at 9am on 25 September 2024 after trains lost power on a stretch near Clementi MRT station. A defective train axle box on one of the first generation C151 trains, which had been deadheading to Ulu Pandan Depot after it was withdrawn at Clementi station, dropped onto the tracks near Dover station and caused the wheels of a bogie to come off the running rail and hit track equipment, including stretches of the third rail, three point machines, power cables and rail clips. In an update at about 9:30pm on 25 September 2024, LTA and SMRT announced that train services between Buona Vista and Jurong East would remain suspended on 26 September 2024, the first day of the PSLE exams, while service between Boon Lay and Jurong East, and Queenstown and Buona Vista, would each run their own separate shuttle services every 10 minutes. On Thursday night, SMRT announced that no trains will run between Jurong East and Buona Vista for a third straight day, with full service expected to resume the following Monday. However, in an update at about 4:30pm on 29 September 2024, the target date for restoration of full service was delayed to Tuesday. On September 30, SMRT and LTA announced that full service would fully resume on October 1, with westbound train speeds being reduced from the usual 60-80 kilometres per hour (37.5-50mph) to 40 kilometres per hour (25mph) until October 3, as part of a standard process after rail replacements.

== Network and operations ==
Train services on the East–West Line operates from approximately 5:30 am to around midnight daily. In general, during peak hours, train frequency is 2 to 3 minutes while during non-peak hours the frequency is reduced to 5 minutes throughout the entire route.

The first train departure times are as follows:

From	Heading to	Departing at
Tanah Merah	Pasir Ris	4:59 am - Weekdays; 5:01 am - Saturdays; 5:27 am - Sundays & public holidays (Note: 5:12 am (weekdays), 5:14 am (Saturdays) and 5:40 am (Sundays & public holidays) as a downroute from Pasir Ris to reach Jurong East at 6:07 am (weekdays), 6:09 am (Saturdays) and 6:33 am (Sundays & public holidays))
Tanah Merah	Changi Airport	5:07 am - Weekdays; 5:07 am - Saturdays; 5:31 am - Sundays & public holidays (Note: Reaches one full loop at 5:29 am (weekdays and Saturdays) and 5:52 am (Sundays and public holidays).)
Clementi	Tanah Merah	5:25 am - Weekdays; 5:26 am - Saturdays; 5:56 am - Sundays & public holidays
Tuas Link	Clementi	5:03 am - Weekdays; 5:04 am - Saturdays; 5:35 am - Sundays & public holidays

=== Route ===
Geographically accurate map of the East–West Line

As its name implies, the East–West Line connects central Singapore to both eastern and western parts of the island, with an additional branch between Changi Airport and Tanah Merah, which operates as a separate shuttle service. It is 57.2 kilometres (35.5 miles) long and it is predominantly double-tracked, but certain short sections at Tanah Merah, Outram Park and Joo Koon widens to three tracks, four tracks nearby Jurong East station and a section between Jurong East and Clementi station and five tracks nearby Changi Depot and Tanah Merah station.

Some stations are commonly placed at the middle of the roads such as Tanah Merah, Bedok, Queenstown, Commonwealth, Dover, Clementi, Pioneer, Joo Koon, Gul Circle, Tuas Crescent and Tuas West Road. The line runs mostly on overhead viaducts but goes underground in the city area between Kallang and Redhill, Bedok and Kembangan, and between Expo and Changi Airport. Travelling from one end of the line to the other takes about 85 minutes.

The line begins above ground at Pasir Ris station from where it continues to head south towards Simei station. The line curves between Simei to Tanah Merah stations and continues westwards, joining the Changi Airport branch, paralleling New Upper Changi Road. Three branch lines to the East Coast Integrated Depot and to Changi Airport station exists between Simei and Tanah Merah stations. At Tanah Merah station, the line extends to four tracks due to its interchange with the Changi branch before turning back into two tracks in a western direction.

From Bedok station to Kembangan station, the line goes underground but then goes above-ground, and follows the route of Sims Avenue and Sims Avenue East in an opposite direction. After Kallang station, the line goes underground through the Central Area and runs heads south-west towards City Hall station. It then runs parallel to the North–South Line between City Hall and Raffles Place stations, which are cross-platform interchanges to the North–South Line. After Tanjong Pagar, the line curves northwestwards towards Outram Park. After Tiong Bahru, the line continues above ground starting with Redhill station and follows the direction of Commonwealth Avenue, Commonwealth Avenue West and Boon Lay Way. Between Clementi and Jurong East station, three branches (one going east and two going west) to Ulu Pandan Depot are deployed. At Jurong East station, the line extends again to four tracks due to its interchange with the North–South Line but then, separates into two before heading west to Chinese Garden station. After Pioneer station, the line heads south-west before curving westwards towards Joo Koon station. The line terminates at Tuas Link with a branch heading towards Tuas Depot.

The Changi Airport extension starts at Tanah Merah station as a single track before turning eastwards to Expo station. After Expo station, it goes underground and curves south before terminating at Changi Airport station.

The East–West Line was constructed together with the North–South Line. As such, both lines used identical signalling equipment and rolling stock.

=== Stations ===
The line serves 35 stations across 57.2 kilometres (35.5 mi) of track, and stations for the line are coded green on the system map. 8 stations, including Changi Airport, and 7 other stations on the stretch from Lavender to Tiong Bahru are underground, with the rest being elevated. With the exception of Dover, all stations have island platforms.

East–West Line Stations timeline
Date	Project	Description
7 November 1987	Phase 1	Yio Chu Kang – Toa Payoh (now part of the North–South Line)
12 December 1987	Phase 1	Toa Payoh – Outram Park (direct train service to Outram Park via Raffles Place)
12 March 1988	Phase 1A	Outram Park – Clementi
5 November 1988	Phase 2B	Clementi – Lakeside
20 December 1988	Phase 2B	Yio Chu Kang – Yishun (now part of the North–South Line)
4 November 1989	Phase 2A	City Hall – Tanah Merah (separation of the North–South Line & East–West Line)
16 December 1989	Phase 2A	Tanah Merah – Pasir Ris
10 March 1990	Phase 2B	Jurong East – Choa Chu Kang (operates as a branch line from Jurong East, now part of the North–South Line)
6 July 1990	Phase 2B	Lakeside – Boon Lay
10 January 2001	Changi Airport Extension	Tanah Merah – Expo
18 October 2001	Dover station	Dover station between Buona Vista and Clementi
8 February 2002	Changi Airport Extension	Expo – Changi Airport
28 February 2009	Boon Lay Extension (BLE)	Boon Lay – Joo Koon
18 June 2017	Tuas West Extension (TWE)	Joo Koon – Tuas Link
16 November 2017	Tuas West Extension (TWE)	Temporary closure of Joo Koon – Tuas Link (due to a train collision at Joo Koon)
20 November 2017	Tuas West Extension (TWE)	Reopening of Gul Circle – Tuas Link (reopens as a separate line, transfer between Joo Koon & Gul Circle)
28 May 2018	Tuas West Extension (TWE)	Reopening of Joo Koon – Gul Circle (merges into one line)

Legend

Elevated	Line terminus	Transfer outside paid area
Ground-level	Wheelchair accessible	Bus interchange
Underground	Civil Defence Shelter	Other transportation modes

List

Station code	Station name	Image	Interchange; Adjacent transportation	Opening	Cost
EW1 CR5 CP1	Pasir Ris		Cross Island Line (2030); Cross Island Line (Punggol Extension) (2032) ― Pasir Ris	16 December 1989; 36 years ago	S$5 billion
EW2 – DT32	Tampines		Downtown Line ― Tampines; Tampines Concourse	16 December 1989; 36 years ago	S$5 billion
EW3	Simei		—	16 December 1989; 36 years ago	S$5 billion
EW4 CG	Tanah Merah		East–West Line (Changi Airport Branch Line) (until mid-2030s); Thomson–East Coast Line (after mid-2030s)	4 November 1989; 37 years ago	S$5 billion
EW5	Bedok		Bedok	4 November 1989; 37 years ago	S$5 billion
EW6	Kembangan		—	4 November 1989; 37 years ago	S$5 billion
EW7	Eunos		Eunos	4 November 1989; 37 years ago	S$5 billion
EW8 CC9	Paya Lebar		Circle Line	4 November 1989; 37 years ago	S$5 billion
EW9	Aljunied		—	4 November 1989; 37 years ago	S$5 billion
EW10	Kallang		Lorong 1 Geylang (until late 2020s); Kallang (from late 2020s)	4 November 1989; 37 years ago	S$5 billion
EW11	Lavender		—	4 November 1989; 37 years ago	S$5 billion
EW12 DT14	Bugis		Downtown Line	4 November 1989; 37 years ago	S$5 billion
EW13 NS25	City Hall		North–South Line	12 December 1987; 38 years ago	S$5 billion
EW14 NS26	Raffles Place		North–South Line	12 December 1987; 38 years ago	S$5 billion
EW15	Tanjong Pagar		—	12 December 1987; 38 years ago	S$5 billion
EW16 NE3 TE17	Outram Park		North East Line; Thomson–East Coast Line	12 December 1987; 38 years ago	S$5 billion
EW17	Tiong Bahru		—	12 March 1988; 38 years ago	S$5 billion
EW18	Redhill		—	12 March 1988; 38 years ago	S$5 billion
EW19	Queenstown		—	12 March 1988; 38 years ago	S$5 billion
EW20	Commonwealth		—	12 March 1988; 38 years ago	S$5 billion
EW21 CC22	Buona Vista		Circle Line ― Buona Vista; Ghim Moh	12 March 1988; 38 years ago	S$5 billion
EW22	Dover		—	18 October 2001; 25 years ago	S$45 million
EW23 CR17	Clementi		Cross Island Line (2032) ― Clementi	12 March 1988; 38 years ago	S$5 billion
EW24 NS1 JE5	Jurong East		North–South Line; Jurong Region Line (East) (2028) ― Jurong East	5 November 1988; 38 years ago	S$5 billion
EW25	Chinese Garden		—	5 November 1988; 38 years ago	S$5 billion
EW26	Lakeside		—	5 November 1988; 38 years ago	S$5 billion
EW27 JS8	Boon Lay		Jurong Region Line (mid-2028) ― Boon Lay	6 July 1990; 36 years ago	S$5 billion
EW28	Pioneer		—	28 February 2009; 17 years ago	S$436 million
EW29	Joo Koon		Joo Koon	28 February 2009; 17 years ago	S$436 million
EW30	Gul Circle		Cross Island Line (late-2030s)	18 June 2017; 9 years ago	S$3.5 billion
EW31	Tuas Crescent		—	18 June 2017; 9 years ago	S$3.5 billion
EW32	Tuas West Road		—	18 June 2017; 9 years ago	S$3.5 billion
EW33	Tuas Link		Tuas ― Tuas Checkpoint	18 June 2017; 9 years ago	S$3.5 billion
Changi Airport extension (Note: The branch sector of Tanah Merah to Changi Airport was operated as a through service from Boon Lay from 18 November 2001 until 22 July 2003, and has since been replaced as a shuttle service to and from Tanah Merah and Changi Airport. By the mid-2030s, the Changi Airport extension will be converted and will be served by the Thomson–East Coast Line.)
CG1 DT35	Expo		Downtown Line	10 January 2001; 25 years ago	S$850 million
CG2	Changi Airport		Changi Airport ― Changi Airport Terminals 1–3	8 February 2002; 24 years ago	S$850 million

=== Depots ===
Depot name; lines	Location	Image	Line-specific stabling capacity	Cost	Opening	Closed
Ulu Pandan; NSL	Jurong East		45 trains	S$130 million	12 March 1988; 38 years ago	—
Tuas	Tuas		60 trains	S$237.1 million	18 June 2017; 9 years ago	—
East Coast; DTL; TEL (Note: Shares the same depot with Downtown Line and Thomson–East Coast Line on 3 different levels.)	Changi		72 trains	S$1.99 billion	8 December 2025; 11 months ago	—
Changi	Changi		35 trains	S$250 million	4 November 1989; 37 years ago	14 March 2026; 8 months ago

== Infrastructure ==
=== Rolling stock ===
A variety of rolling stock on the East–West Line

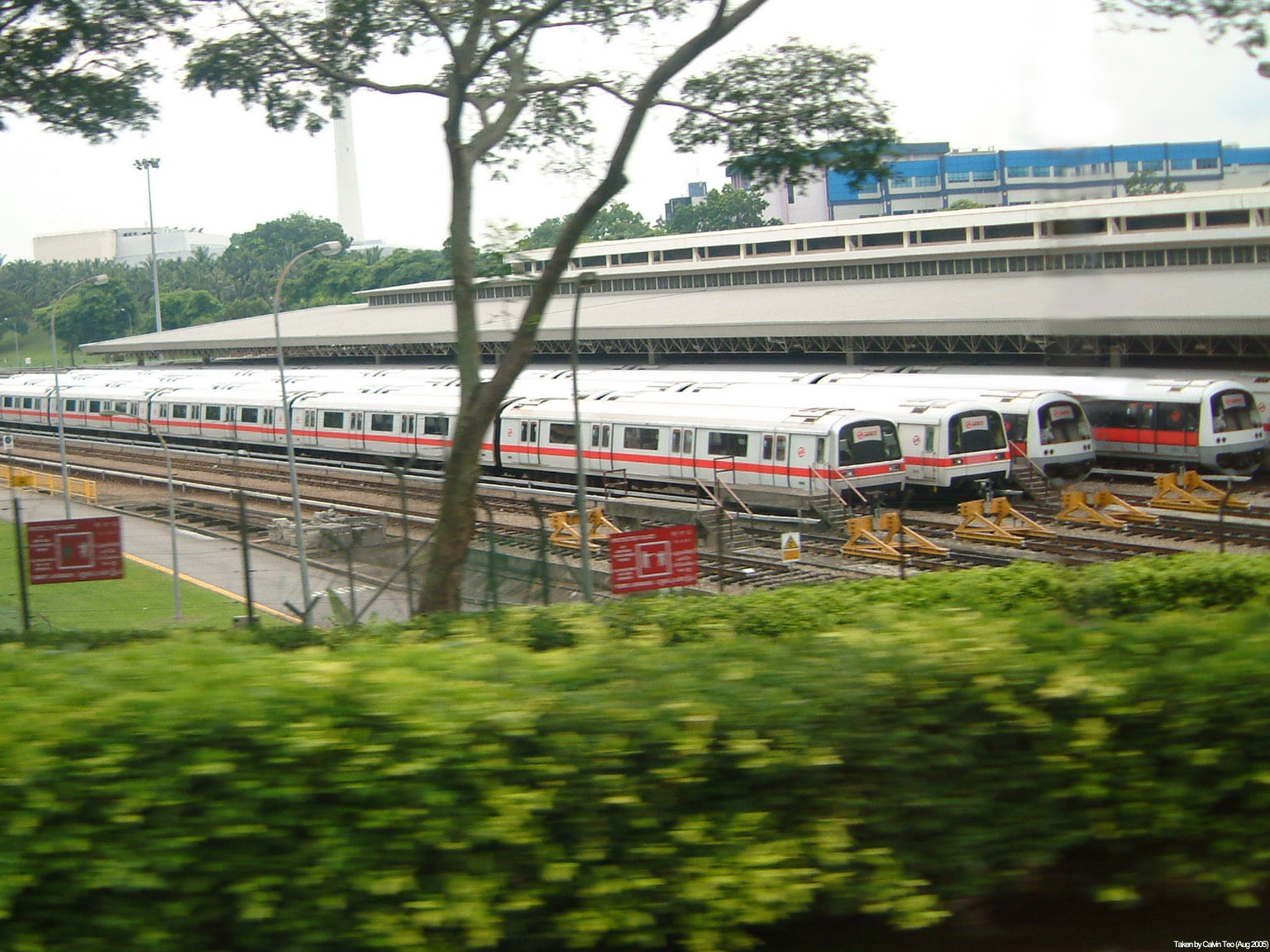
Various older generation rolling stock of the East–West Line parked at Ulu Pandan Depot in 2005

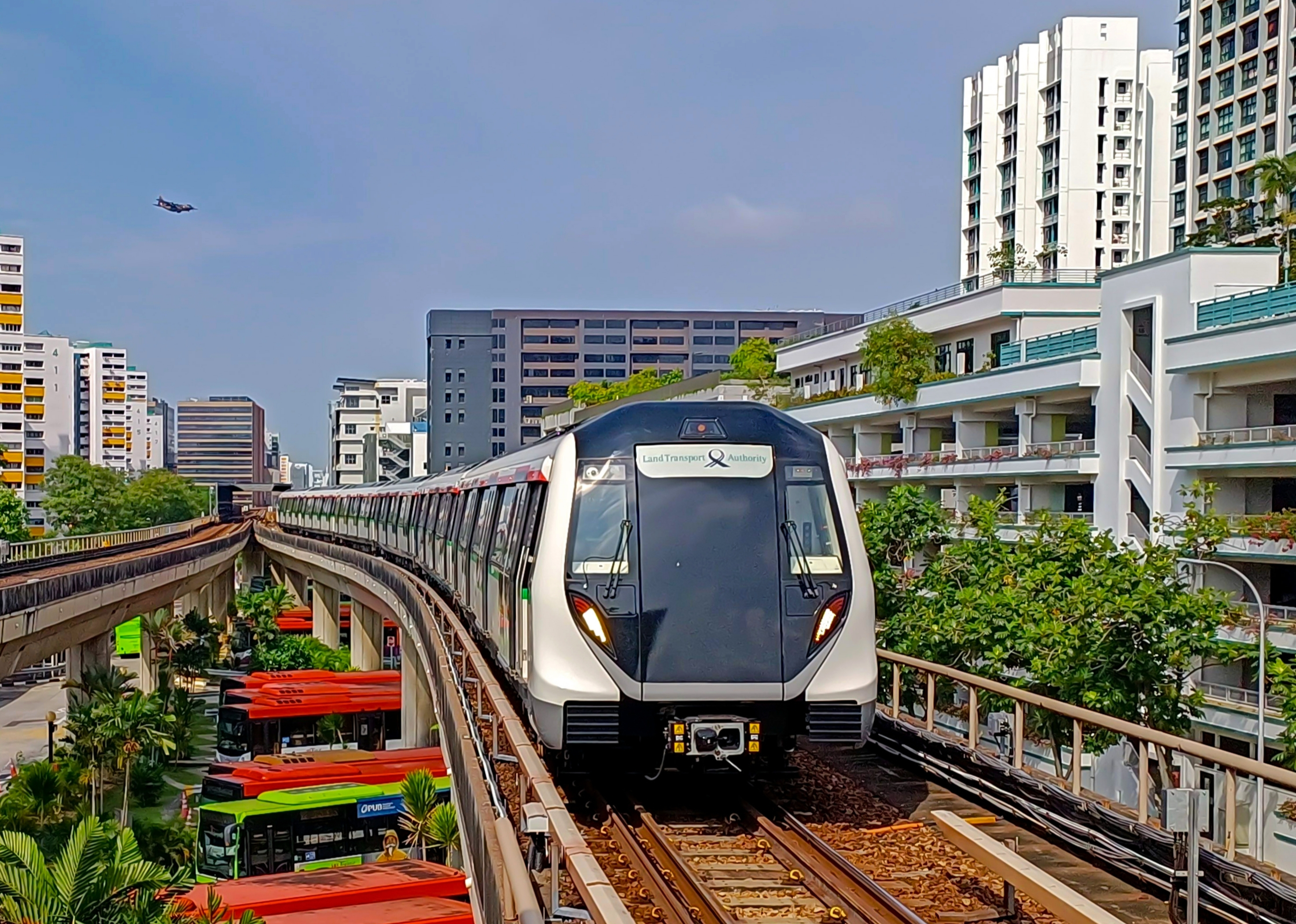
A newer seventh-generation R151 train arriving at Eunos MRT station heading eastbound

Three batches of rolling stock operate on the East–West Line, namely the C151A, C151B and R151 from oldest to newest, shared with the North–South Line. Trains are maintained at Changi Depot, Ulu Pandan Depot and Tuas Depot, which provide train maintenance, inspection and overhaul facilities. These models of rolling stock were introduced to boost the capacity on both the North–South and the East–West lines in order to cope with increasing ridership.

Both the North–South and the East–West lines utilized identical rolling stock up until the 2010s, when the C151A trains were temporary suspended from operating on the North–South Line from January 2012 until November 2013 following the 2011 train disruptions. The C151B trains, which were introduced in April 2017, did not begin revenue service on the full stretch of the East–West Line until the line's trial of the CBTC signalling system in May 2018. The C151C trains, despite their introduction on 30 September 2018 on the North–South Line, almost never run on the East–West Line.

Another generation of rolling stock, the R151 trains, will be delivered from 2022 to 2026, to replace all 66 first-generation C151 trains which were retired in 2025, as well as all 19 second-generation C651 and 21 third-generation C751B trains which were retired in 2024. The R151 trains are the first rolling stock on the East–West Line to be manufactured by Bombardier (Bought by Alstom in 2021), which has also supplied trains for the Downtown Line. The first train entered service on the East–West Line on 4 June 2023.

=== Signalling ===
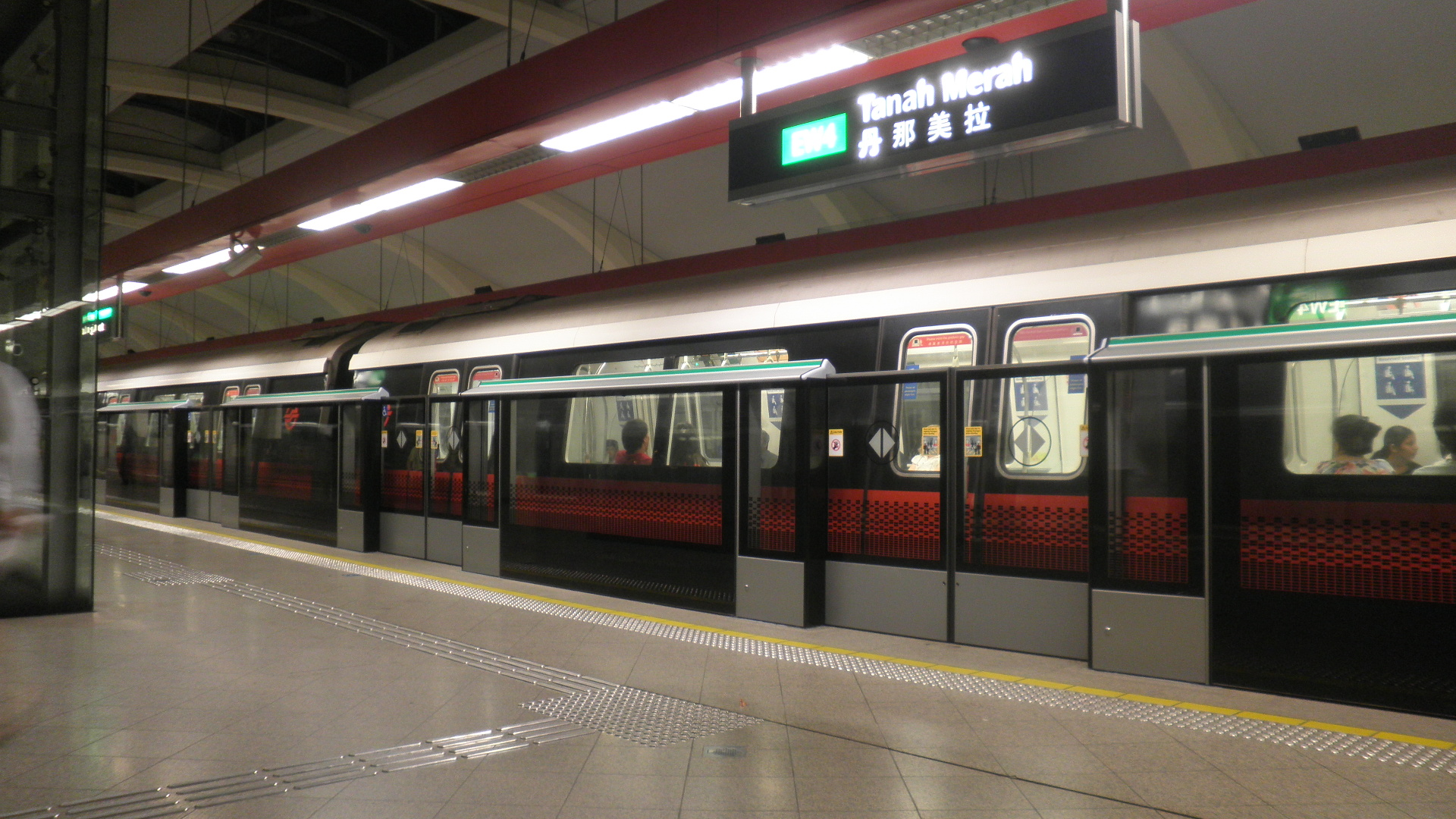
Half-platform screen doors installed in Tanah Merah station

The East–West Line is equipped with Thales SelTrac communications-based train control (CBTC) moving block signalling system with automatic train control (ATC) under automatic train operation (ATO) Grades of Automation (GoA) 3. The subsystems consist of automatic train protection (ATP) to govern train speed, NetTrac MT Automatic Train Supervision (ATS) to track and schedule trains and a computer-based interlocking (CBI) system that prevents incorrect signal and track points to be set.

The old signalling system has undergone decommissioning work from August 2018 and was completed on 23 November 2018. It consists of Westinghouse fixed block signalling system with Automatic train control (ATC) under Automatic train operation (ATO) GoA 2. The subsystems consist of Automatic train protection (ATP) to govern train speed, Automatic Train Supervision (ATS) to track and schedule trains and a Relay interlocking system that prevents incorrect signal and track points to be set.

The stretch of track between Pioneer and Tuas Link stations was equipped with the new signalling system which came into use in June 2017. As the section of track between Pioneer and Joo Koon support 'mixed-mode' of both signalling systems, trains terminating at either Joo Koon or Tuas Link would have to change signalling modes at Pioneer MRT station as trains terminating at Joo Koon would proceed to a turn back siding which was built as part of the TWE which only supports the new signalling system. Eastbound trains towards Pasir Ris would have to change back to the old signalling system at Pioneer MRT station. This procedure was removed after the train collision at Joo Koon as trains terminated at Joo Koon. The new signalling system became fully operational on 28 May 2018.

=== Platform screen doors ===
When the line was first opened, full-height platform screen doors supplied by Westinghouse were installed at underground stations. These doors serve to prevent suicides, enable climate control within the station, better security control by restricting access to the tunnels and tracks and for overall passenger safety considerations. The authorities initially rejected calls for platform screen doors to be installed at elevated stations by casting doubts over functionality and concerns about the high installation costs. Nevertheless, the LTA reversed its decision and made plans to install half-height platform screen doors on elevated stations on 25 January 2008. The first platform screen doors by ST Electronics were installed at Pasir Ris, Jurong East and Yishun stations in 2009 as trial runs. Subsequently, installation began in May 2011 at Ang Mo Kio station on the North–South Line. On 14 March 2012, platform screen doors became operational at all elevated stations on the East–West Line. Stations along the TWE had half-height platform screen doors manufactured by Fangda installed during the station's construction.

== In popular culture ==
The Changi branch line is featured in the tvN series Little Women.
