= FactWire =

Hong Kong investigative news agency

Factwire
- Type: Non-profit
- Industry: News agency
- Founded: 18 August 2015
- Defunct: 10 June 2022
- Headquarters: Kwun Tong, Kowloon; Hong Kong
- Website: www.factwire.org

FactWire (Chinese: 傳真社) was an investigative news agency headquartered in Kowloon, Hong Kong. Funded by crowdfunding in 2015, FactWire was founded with the initial financial support of 3,300 Hong Kong residents. As a non-profit public service news agency, it was established on 18 August 2015, and became operational on 1 March 2016. FactWire mainly focused on watchdog investigative reporting wired to a large number of Hong Kong's mainstream news outlets. Factwire shut down in 2022.

== History ==
The crowdfunding to establish Factwire surpassed the HK$3 million goal to reach HK$4.75 million via the crowdfunding platform FringeBacker.

=== Train quality exposé ===
In July 2016, the agency published an exposé on the secret recall of Mass Rapid Transit (MRT) C151A trains to their manufacturer, CRRC Qingdao Sifang Co., Ltd. The trains reportedly suffered from a multitude of quality issues including underframe cracking, which can threaten the structural integrity of an entire train car. The agency quoted a former Kowloon-Canton Railway Corporation executive who stated that cracks forming in new components was "very unusual" and a sign of quality issues. Factwire reporters filmed the trains, covered under tarps, being shipped out of Singapore under cover of darkness, and later located the trains at the CSR Sifang plant in Qingdao. The same day, the agency published a piece revealing that the Hong Kong government's Transport and Housing Bureau had been aware of the quality issues for more than a year. A whistleblower emailed the bureau in January 2015, but absent any government intervention the MTR Corporation awarded a HK$6 billion contract for 93 new trains to CSR Sifang in July 2015.

Singaporean transport minister Khaw Boon Wan responded that the underframe cracks were a routine issue that had been blown out of proportion. He blamed the controversy on "factions in Hong Kong who wanted to cause some difficulties for mainland China." Khaw further stated that a layman would not understand the difference between a serious crack and a minor one, and that publicly disclosing the cracks could have caused undue panic. The Land Transport Authority blamed the cracks on impurities in the car body, and stated that the trains remained safe for service. Factwire released an open letter in response to Khaw's comments, stating that it "deeply regretted" the remarks and criticised the minister for blaming the news agency "instead of taking responsibility for an incident which has damaged the Singaporean public's trust in the authorities". The agency denied that its reporting was politically motivated and explained that "every investigative report published by FactWire must be founded on impregnable evidence and cover serious public interests at stake. We will never allow commercial or political considerations to override our professional journalistic judgement."

After publishing the reports Factwire received anonymous threats and reported an "unidentified individual" acting suspiciously outside their offices, despite the fact that the address of their newsroom had been kept secret. The anonymous message stated "the subway train story has caused a big reaction, someone sent/ sending some trouble your way". Factwire responded that "[our] investigation reports are not meant to target any particular party. We have a duty to the truth." Hong Kong has seen violence against journalists in recent years, including the knife attack on Kevin Lau and various firebombings against Next Digital.

=== Taishan Nuclear Power Plant Defects Exposé ===
In December 2017, Factwire reported that they had uncovered cracks in important components of reactors in the Taishan Nuclear Power Plant, including a defective reactor vessel head that was set to remain in use for seven years. The boiler had cracked during testing, and that welding on the component was termed "problematic". Factwire questioned why the nuclear power plant should be allowed to go online despite these defects and plausible danger to nearby neighborhoods. On June 29, 2018, Taishan 1 proceeded to be connected to the grid and became the first EPR to enter commercial operation on December 13, 2018. CGN Power, the plant's major shareholder, did not respond to FactWire's enquiries.

== Closure ==
On 10 June 2022, Factwire abruptly ceased operations. It said on its website, "It is time for us to bid you farewell" and "Termination of Operations. Thank you for your support."

The statement briefly referred to the changing media landscape, but did not specify the reasons for the site's closure. Relevant reports pointed out that the news website was hacked a month before the shutdown, resulting in the data of 3,700 subscribers' being exposed.

== Awards and recognition ==
=== SOPA Awards 2020 ===
Award Type	Category	Title of Entry
Excellence in Investigative Reporting 卓越調查報道獎	Honorable Mentions	Did anyone really die in Prince Edward MTR on Aug 31st? 太子站 831 到底有無死人？
SOPA Award for Public Service Journalism 亞洲出版業協會公共服務新聞大獎	Finalist	Track the fake news in Anti-Extradition Bill Movement 追擊反修例風波的假資訊

=== 2020 Human Rights Press Awards ===
Award Type	Title of Entry
Investigative Feature Writing Chinese Merit 調查專題 中文 優異奬	太子831 傷者數目1小時改4次 僅1人見過首名救護員 至少10人曾表不適未獲送院

== See also ==
- Hong Kong Free Press – a crowdfunded English news website
