= Ulu Pandan Depot =

MRT depot in Singapore

Ulu Pandan Train Depot 乌鲁班丹车厂 烏魯班丹車廠
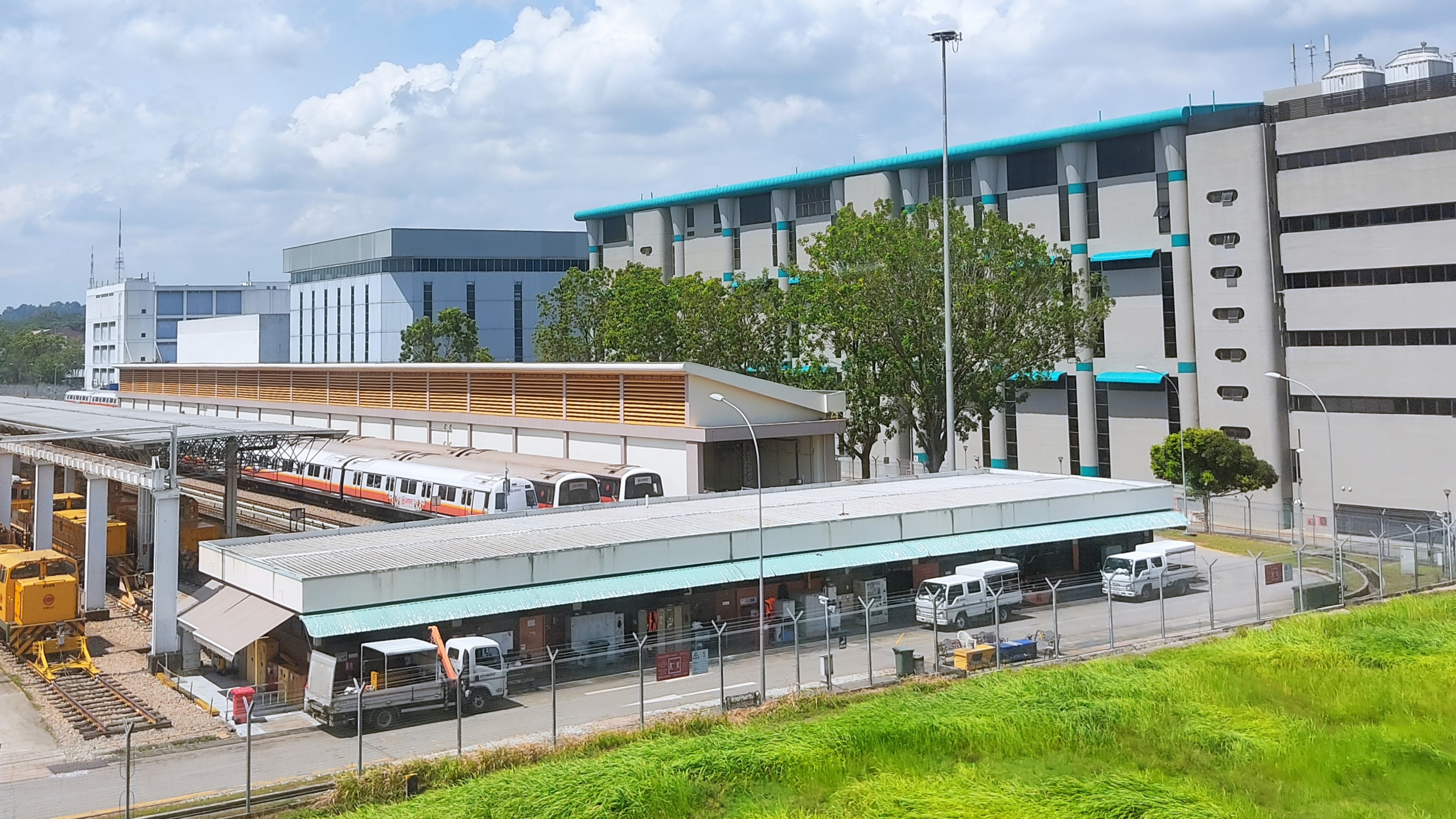
- Ulu Pandan Depot as viewed from the mainline tracks, September 2020
- Interactive map of Ulu Pandan Train Depot 乌鲁班丹车厂 烏魯班丹車廠

Location
- Location: 20 Toh Tuck Avenue, Singapore 597006
- Coordinates: 1°20′0.33″N 103°45′36.51″E

Characteristics
- Owner: Land Transport Authority
- Operator: SMRT Trains Ltd (SMRT Corporation)
- Depot code: UPD
- Type: Electric
- Roads: Toh Tuck Avenue
- Rolling stock: Kawasaki–Sifang C151A; Kawasaki–Sifang C151B; Kawasaki–Sifang C151C; Alstom Movia R151
- Routes served: NSL North–South Line; EWL East–West Line

History
- Opened: 12 March 1988; 38 years ago

Ulu Pandan Depot (simplified Chinese: 乌鲁班丹车厂; traditional Chinese: 烏魯班丹車廠) is a train depot near Jurong East, Singapore. It serves the trains on the North–South and East–West Line.

It has a capacity of 45 trains and has an area of 130,000 square metres. Train inspections are carried out at this depot.

Commuters can have a glimpse of it while on a train between Clementi and Jurong East stations. It is located off Toh Tuck Avenue and sits along Toh Tuck Avenue. The depot is located between Clementi station and Jurong East station on the East–West Line and has three reception tracks: two tracks westbound towards Jurong East station and one track eastbound towards Clementi station.

== History ==
Ulu Pandan Depot was first mentioned in Contract 204, which detailed the construction of Clementi station as well as elevated links to the depot. It was awarded to a joint venture between Lim Kah Ngam construction and the Aoki corporation. In August 1985, it was announced that Hiap Shing Construction had won the contract for Ulu Pandan Depot's earthworks at S$2.67 million (1985) (US$1.21 million), (Note: The Straits Times said that the value was $2.68m) beating eleven other contractors. Since the project did not require foreign expertise, it was therefore limited to local and foreign contracts registered under the Construction Development Industry Board as well as undertaken projects worth at least S$5 million (1985) (US$2.27 million). The contract expected Hiap Shing to build a drainage system and to clear the site for construction within 9 months. In October of the same year, it was announced that the JDC Corporation and Jurong Engineering won the S$79.58 million (1985) (US$36.17 million) contract to build Ulu Pandan Depot and Jurong East station along with 3.2 kilometres (2.0 mi) of viaducts from Ulu Pandan Depot to Jurong East station. The contract for Ulu Pandan Depot's fire protection and electrical services was awarded to a joint venture between the Resources Development Corporation and Sato Kogyo Co Ltd for S$92 million (1986) (US$42.25 million) in March 1986.

Plans have also been made for the expansion of Ulu Pandan Depot, with LTA commissioning an engineering study in 2015.
