= East Coast Integrated Depot =

MRT and bus depot in Singapore

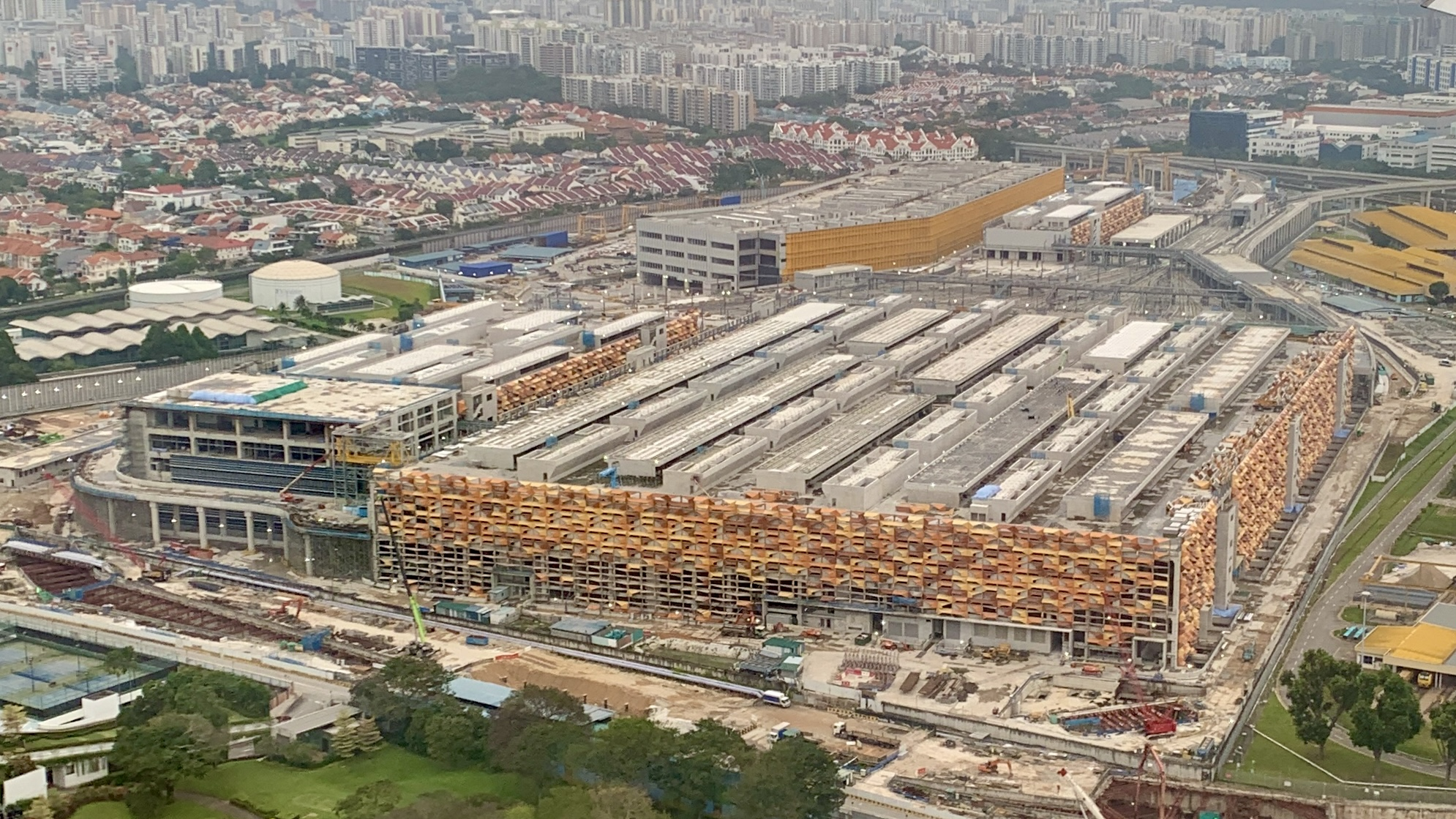
- Construction site of the East Coast Integrated Depot in January 2024
- Interactive map of East Coast Integrated Depot

Location
- Location: 10 Laguna Golf Green, Singapore 488956
- Coordinates: 1.32736°N 103.95734°E

Characteristics
- Operator: SMRT Trains Ltd (SMRT Corporation) (EWL & TEL); SBS Transit DTL Pte Ltd (ComfortDelGro Corporation) (DTL); Go-Ahead Singapore Pte Ltd (Go-Ahead Group plc) (Bus Depot)
- Depot code: ECID
- Type: Elevated (EWL); At-grade (TEL & bus depot); Underground (DTL)
- Roads: Upper Changi Road East
- Rolling stock: Kawasaki–Sifang C151A; Kawasaki–Sifang C151B; Kawasaki–Sifang C151C; Bombardier Movia C951; Alstom Movia R151; Kawasaki–Sifang T251
- Routes served: East–West Line; Downtown Line; Thomson–East Coast Line

History
- Opened: 8 December 2025; 10 months ago (EWL); 5 July 2026; 4 months ago (Bus depot); 26 December 2026; 50 days' time (TEL & DTL)

The East Coast Integrated Depot (ECID) is an integrated bus and train depot located in the Xilin subzone of Tampines, Singapore. It currently serves the East–West Line (EWL) of the Mass Rapid Transit (MRT) system and will also serve the Downtown Line (DTL) and Thomson–East Coast Line (TEL) by the second half of 2026.

The ECID is located beside the site of the former Changi Depot, which was decommissioned in tandem with the opening of the ECID. It will be the first MRT depot to serve three MRT lines and the third to be integrated with a bus depot, after Tuas Depot on the EWL and Gali Batu Depot on the DTL. With its design, an estimated 44 ha (110 acres) of land was saved, equivalent to approximately 60 football fields, as compared to building the depots separately. The depot is able to house approximately 200 trains of varying sizes and lengths, and 550 buses.

== History ==
The ECID was first announced in August 2014. Contract T301 for the construction of the depot, reception tunnels and its associated facilities was awarded to GS Engineering & Construction Corporation at a sum of S$1.99 billion on 21 March 2016. Construction began in 2016 and was initially planned for completion in 2024. Structural works reached 75% completion in September 2022, and 98% in November 2024. It was also announced previously that the opening of the depot had been pushed back to 2026.

In 2025, service on the EWL between Bedok and Tampines stations, and between Tanah Merah and Expo stations, was suspended from 29 November to 7 December. The service suspension allowed for work to connect the ECID to the EWL. Following the service suspension, the ECID began serving EWL trains. By 26 December 2026, the ECID will also serve the DTL and TEL.

== Description ==
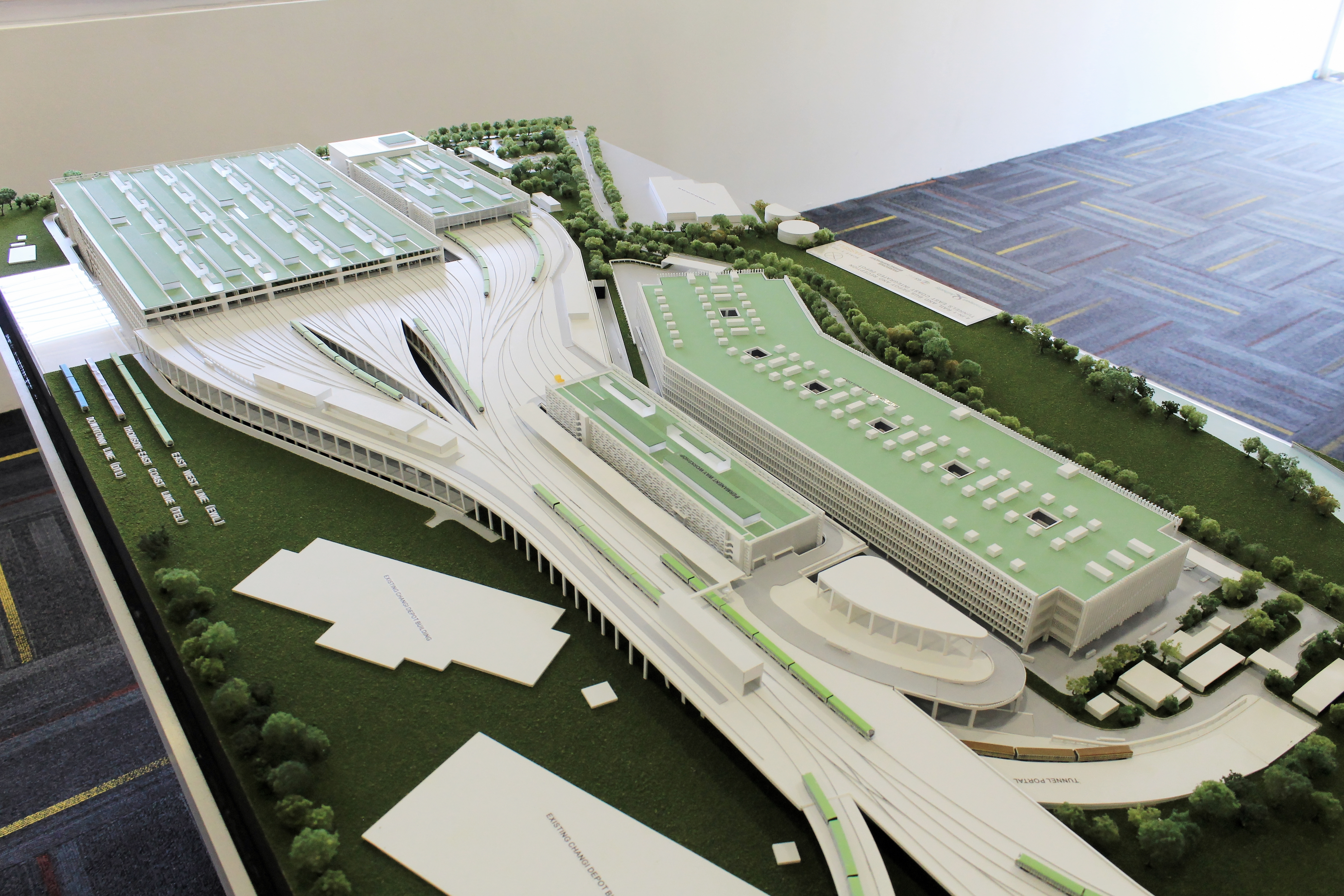
Model of the East Coast Integrated Depot

The East Coast Integrated Depot consists of a multi-level train depot and a multi-level bus depot.

=== Train depot ===
The train depot will consist of three levels, each serving a different MRT line. The underground portion will house a 66-track depot for the Downtown Line, which will be commissioned following the opening of Stage 3e of the line. The at-grade portion will house a 62-track depot for the Thomson–East Coast Line, to be commissioned following the completion of Stage 5 of the line. The elevated portion will house a 72-track depot for the East–West Line, replacing the Changi Depot, which was closed on 14 March 2026. Each of the three depots will operate independently, a first for Singapore, and will be designed to accommodate trains of varying lengths: three-car, four-car, and six-car configurations, depending on the line they serve.

The facility will be located between Simei station and Tanah Merah station on the East–West Line, between Xilin station and Sungei Bedok station on the Downtown Line, and off Sungei Bedok station on the Thomson–East Coast Line. It will also connect to Tanah Merah station on the Thomson–East Coast Line after the Changi Airport Branch is absorbed into the line.

The depot has ten reception tracks:

- 2 tracks eastbound towards Simei station for the EWL
- 1 track westbound towards Tanah Merah station for the EWL
- 1 track eastbound towards Xilin station for the DTL
- 4 tracks westbound towards Sungei Bedok station for the DTL and TEL
- 1 track westbound towards Tanah Merah station for the TEL
- 1 track eastbound towards Changi Airport Terminal 5 for the TEL

=== Bus depot ===
East Coast Bus Depot is a multi-storey bus depot facility, located adjacent to the train depot within the Sungei Bedok area. It forms part of the East Coast Integrated Depot, an integrated rail and bus facility that also serves the East–West Line, Downtown Line, and Thomson–East Coast Line. The co-location of rail and bus depots allows for more efficient land use and construction.

The depot was planned to support the growing bus fleet under the Bus Service Enhancement Programme (BSEP) and Bus Contracting Model (BCM). It is designed to accommodate over 500 buses and will include a Bus Operations Control Centre, administrative offices, maintenance workshops, refuelling and washing facilities, and multi-level parking. Similar to Soon Lee Bus Depot and Woodlands Bus Depot, the ground level will host maintenance and service facilities, while bus parking decks will be located on the second and third levels. It will have 550 parking lots.

With the Tampines bus package awarded to Go-Ahead Singapore in September 2025, the operator took over as the anchor operator of the depot on 5 July 2026.
