= Tuas Depot =

MRT depot in Singapore

Tuas Depot 大士车厂
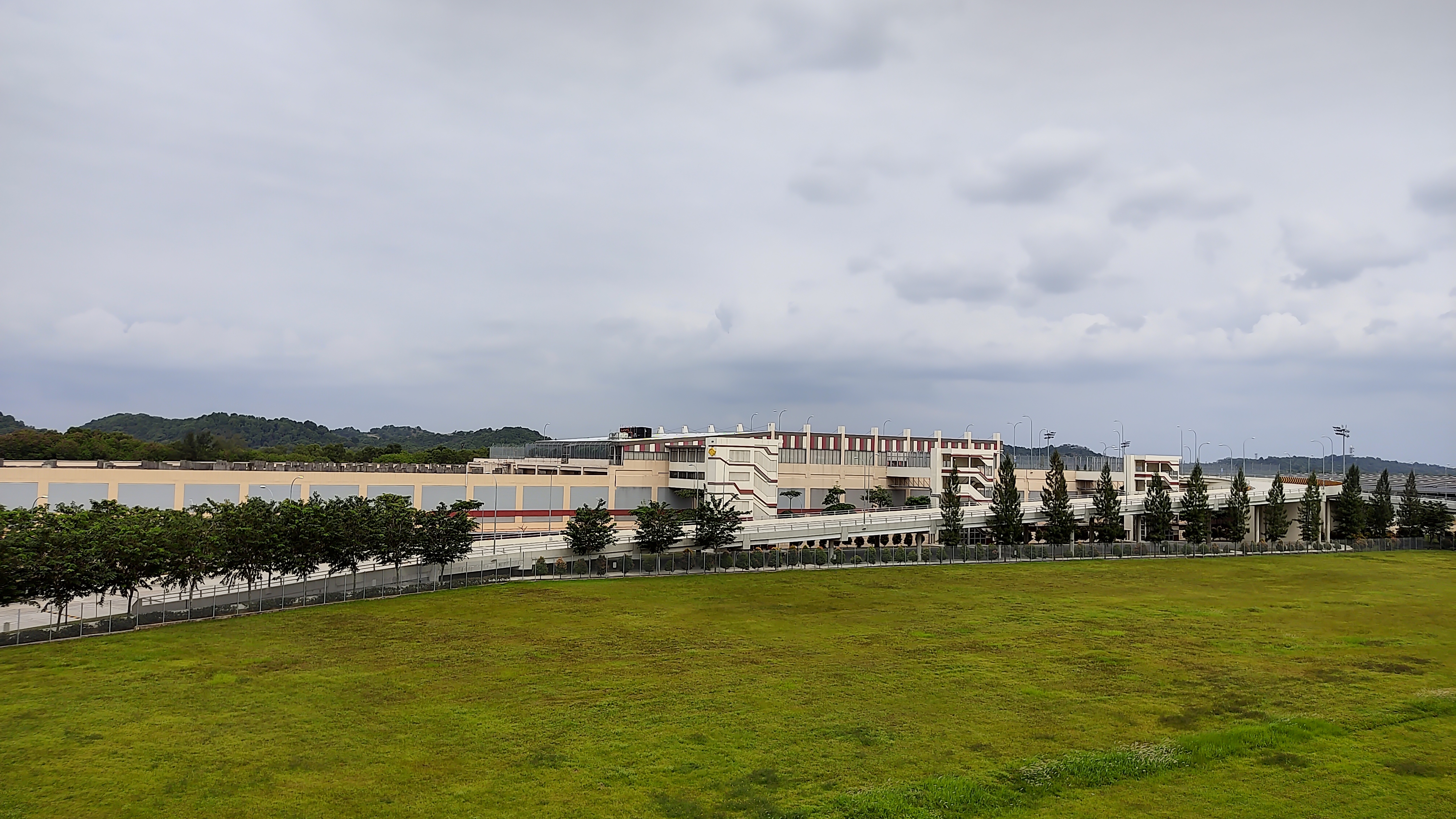
- Tuas Depot in 2021
- Interactive map of Tuas Depot 大士车厂

Location
- Location: 3 Tuas West Road, Singapore 638391
- Coordinates: 1°20′17.0″N 103°38′37.2″E

Characteristics
- Owner: Land Transport Authority
- Operator: SMRT Trains Ltd (SMRT Corporation)
- Depot code: TWD
- Type: At-grade
- Roads: Tuas West Road, Tuas West Drive
- Rolling stock: Kawasaki–Sifang C151A; Kawasaki–Sifang C151B; Kawasaki–Sifang C151C; Alstom Movia R151
- Routes served: EWL East–West Line

History
- Opened: 18 June 2017; 9 years ago

Tuas Depot is an MRT depot serving the East–West Line, located between Tuas West Road and Tuas West Drive in Singapore. It was constructed by Jurong Primewide Pte Ltd at a contract sum of S$237.1 million. Construction of the depot together with the four stations of the Tuas West Extension started in late 2011; they were fully operational on 18 June 2017. The depot is located after Tuas Link MRT station. It can house up to 60 trains. This is the second largest depot as the maintenance for the East–West Line trains will be carried out here. With the opening of this depot, the maintenance load of Bishan Depot has been lightened, as each lines has its own maintenance centre.

The depot is located off Tuas Link station on the East–West Line and has two reception tracks: two tracks eastbound towards Tuas Link station.

== History ==
The contract for the construction of Tuas Depot was awarded to Jurong Primewide Pte Ltd for S$237.1 million (US$188.51 million).

== Integration of bus terminal ==
Tuas Bus Terminal was moved to a site on the roof of Tuas MRT Depot, adjacent to Tuas Link station, and opened on 7 October 2017.

The area designated for the proposed bus terminal is approximately 10,000 sq metres which is accessible via a ramp connecting directly to Tuas West Drive or another ramp structure connecting to Tuas Link 4.

The bus terminal has a naturally ventilated concourse area with facilities such as two passenger service offices, and two separate offices for main and secondary operators. The terminal is also staff friendly, with an administrative office, a staff lounge, designated staff toilets, a canteen and other rooms. Passenger elevators connect the ground level to the bus terminal. It is accessible, having priority queues for the elderly and disabled, and barrier free toilets.
