= Fuji Electric =

Japanese electrical equipment company

Fuji Electric Co., Ltd.

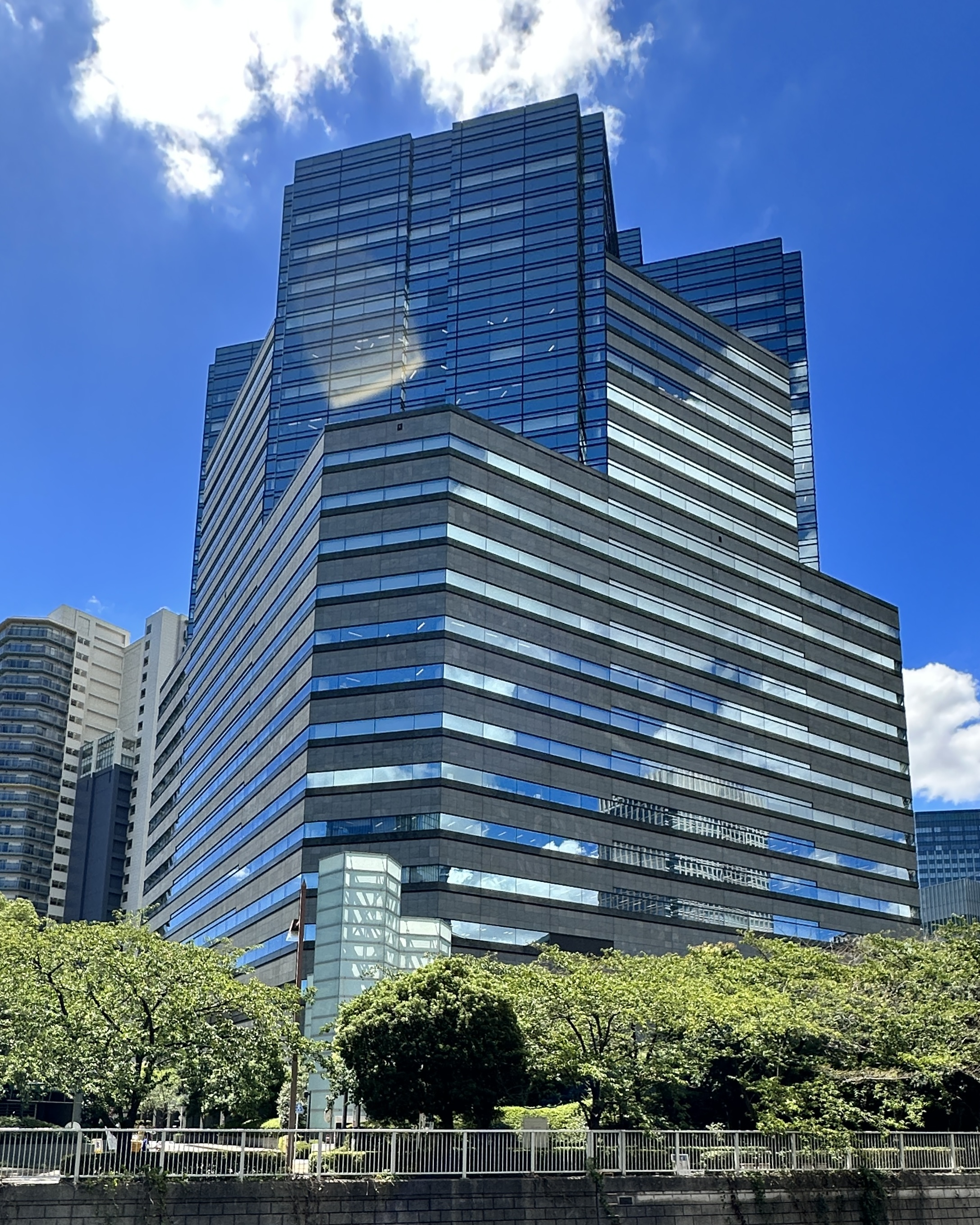
- Headquarters at Gate City Ōsaki in Ōsaki, Tokyo
- Native name: 富士電機株式会社
- Romanized name: Fuji Denki kabushiki gaisha
- Type: Public KK
- Traded as: TYO: 6504; Nikkei 225 component
- Industry: Electrical equipment
- Founded: (August 29, 1923; 103 years ago)
- Headquarters: Gate City Ohsaki, East Tower, Ōsaki, Shinagawa-ku, Tokyo 141-0032, Japan
- Key people: Michihiro Kitazawa (President and Chairman of the Board)
- Products: see Divisions & Products
- Revenue: ▲JPY 276.8 billion (FY 2016) (US$ 1.54 billion) (FY 2016)
- Net income: ▼JPY 19.6 billion (FY 2013) (US$ 190.2 million million) (FY 2013)
- Number of employees: 26,503 (consolidated, as of March 31, 2017)
- Website: Official website

Fuji Electric Co., Ltd. (富士電機株式会社, Fuji Denki Kabushiki-gaisha), operating under the brand name FE, is a Japanese electrical equipment company, manufacturing pressure transmitters, flowmeters, gas analyzers, controllers, inverters, pumps, generators, ICs, motors, and power equipment.

== History ==
Fuji Electric was established in 1923 as a capital and technology tie-up between Furukawa Electric, a spinoff from Furukawa zaibatsu company, and Siemens AG. The name "Fuji" is derived from Furukawa's "Fu" and Siemens' "Ji", since German pronunciation of Siemens is written jiimensu in Japanese romanization. The characters used to write Mount Fuji were used as ateji.

In 1935, Fuji Electric spun off the telephone department as Fuji Tsushinki (lit. Fuji Communications Equipment, now Fujitsu).

== Divisions and products ==
- Power and social infrastructure
  - Nuclear power-related equipment
  - Solar power generation systems
  - Fuel cells
  - Energy management systems
  - Smart meters
- Industrial infrastructure
  - Transmission and distribution equipment — joint venture with Schneider Electric
  - Industrial power supply equipment
  - Industrial drive systems
  - Heating and induction furnace equipment
  - Plant control and measurement systems
  - Radiation monitoring systems
- Power electronics
  - Inverters/servo systems
  - Transportation power electronics
  - Uninterruptible power supply systems
  - Power conditioners
  - Power distribution and control equipment
- Electronic devices
  - Power semiconductors
  - Photoconductive drums
  - Magnetic disks
- Food and beverage distribution
  - Vending machines
  - Retail distribution systems
  - Currency handling equipment
  - Freezing and refrigerated showcases
