= Thales Rail Signalling Solutions =

Rail automation products company

- Company type: Division
- Industry: Rapid Transit Signalling
- Founded: December 31, 1998; 27 years ago
- Defunct: May 31, 2024
- Successor: Hitachi Rail
- Headquarters: Toronto, Ontario, Canada
- Products: SelTrac
- Number of employees: 2000
- Parent: Thales Group

Thales Rail Signalling Solutions was a division of Thales Group that supplies transportation-based automation solutions for railways. Its operations are controlled from several locations:

- its head office in Paris, France
- its railway business divisional centers in Ditzingen and Berlin, Germany; Vienna, Austria; and Hengelo, the Netherlands
- its mass transit business divisional centre in Toronto, Ontario, Canada

== History ==
The original moving block signaling system for rapid transit was introduced by Urban Transportation Development Corporation (an Ontario Crown corporation) for its Intermediate Capacity Transit System (ICTS). In 1985, the ICTS technology was successfully implemented on three new railway lines in North America, all of which continue to use the system today:

- SkyTrain (Vancouver, British Columbia) - original installation now part of the Expo Line and later used on new lines and extensions
- Scarborough RT (Toronto, Ontario), part of the Toronto subway network
- Detroit People Mover (Detroit, Michigan), opened in 1987

UTDC's rolling stock manufacturing operations were later absorbed by Bombardier Transportation, who divested the signalling technology to Alcatel-Lucent. In April 2006, Thales Group announced it would be acquiring Alcatel Rail Signalling Solutions in a deal which also raised Alcatel's ownership of Thales to 21.66 percent.

In August 2021, Thales announced that the ground transportation business was to be sold to Hitachi Rail for €1,660 million. The process has been completed on May 31, 2024.

== Products ==
Various railway signalling systems:

- SelTrac (communications-based train control for mass transit)
- AlTrac
- ComTrac
- NetTrac
- FieldTrac
- RBC (Radio Block Controller)
- OBU (OnBoard Unit)
- ETCS
- LZB

Besides its signalling solutions, Thales additionally develops electronic interlocking systems, axle counters that can replace track circuits, various types of point machines, and railway worker protection systems.
