= Tuas station =

Tuas station was the provisional name for Gul Circle MRT station – a Singapore Mass Rapid Transit (MRT) station.

Other stations that contain the name "Tuas" are:

- Tuas Crescent MRT station, an MRT station on the East West line (EWL)
- Tuas West Road MRT station, another MRT station on the EWL.
- Tuas Link MRT station, the terminus of the EWL.

== See also ==
- Tuas Depot
- Tuas
