= Tuas Crescent MRT station =

Mass Rapid Transit station in Singapore

Tuas Crescent EW31 大士弯 துவாஸ் கிரசண்ட்
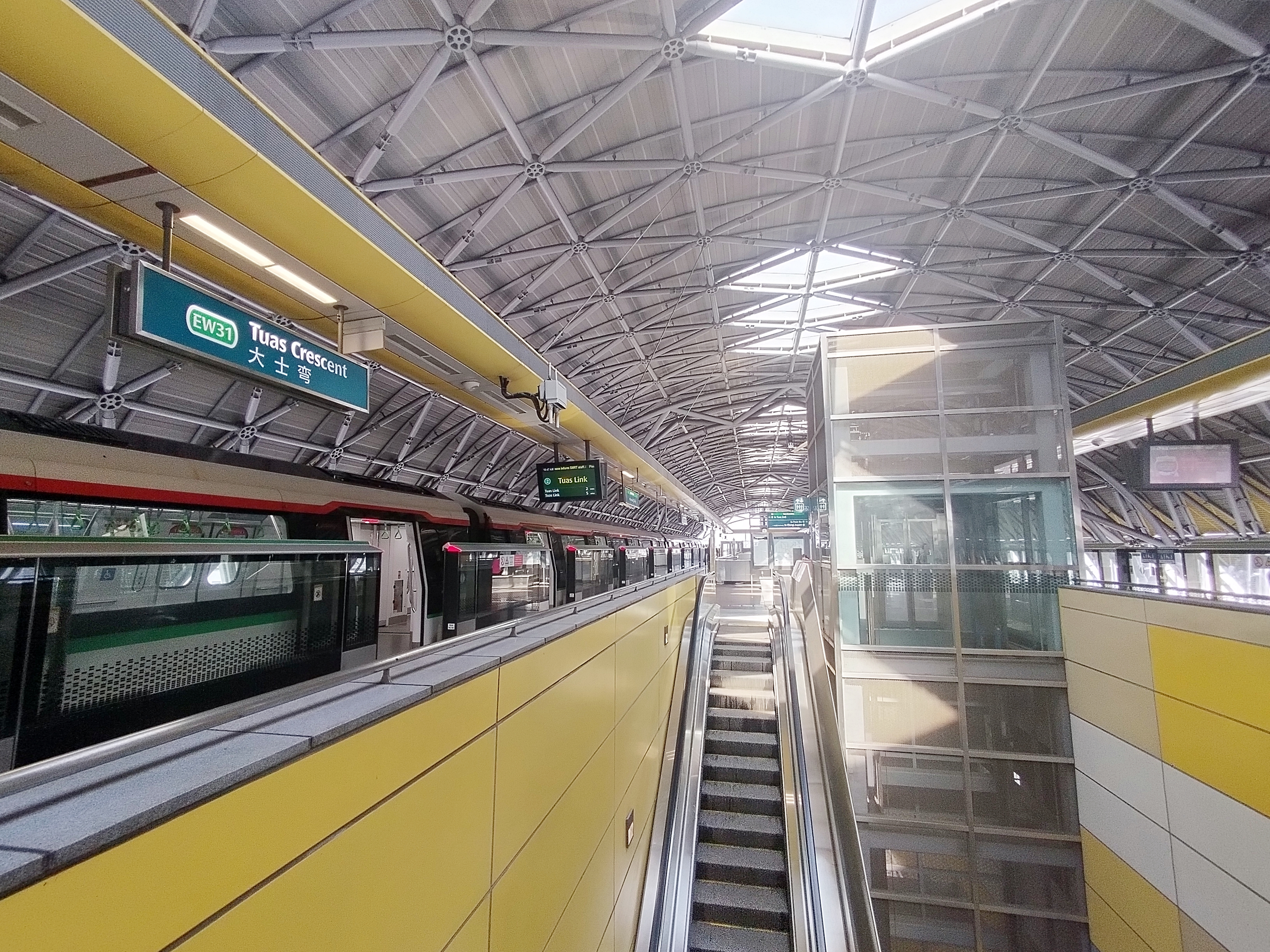
- View of the platform level of Tuas Crescent station.

General information
- Location: 90 Pioneer Road; Singapore 639608
- Coordinates: 1°19′16.1″N 103°38′56.4″E
- System: Mass Rapid Transit (MRT) station
- Operator: SMRT Trains Ltd (SMRT Corporation)
- Line: East–West Line
- Platforms: 2 (1 island platform)
- Tracks: 2
- Connections: Bus, Taxi

Construction
- Structure type: Elevated
- Platform levels: 1
- Parking: No
- Cycle facilities: Yes
- Accessible: Yes

History
- Opened: 18 June 2017; 9 years ago

Passengers
- June 2024: 4,672 per day

Services
| Preceding station | Mass Rapid Transit | Following station |
|---|---|---|
| Gul Circle towards Pasir Ris | East–West Line | Tuas West Road towards Tuas Link |
Track layout
Location
- Location within Singapore Rail

Tuas Crescent MRT station is an above-ground Mass Rapid Transit (MRT) station along the East–West Line in Tuas, Singapore. This station is named after a road in the vicinity.

== History ==
It was first announced on 11 January 2011 by then-Transport Minister Raymond Lim in a speech while visiting Bedok when new platform screen doors opened there. It was expected to be completed by 2016 and would benefit an estimated 100,000 commuters daily.

According to Lianhe Zaobao, this station and the tracks linking it are built in the middle of a vehicular viaduct, a historical first for Singapore train services.

It has the longest staircase in all stations with 105 steps, and the longest escalator of 17.5m in Singapore's rail network.

The opening of the station was delayed from 2016 to the second quarter of 2017 to make way for the installation of the new signalling system. It entered operations on 18 June 2017.

Stations between Gul Circle to Tuas Link were temporary closed between 16 and 19 November 2017 following collision incident happened between Joo Koon and Gul Circle. On 20 November 2017, train service from Gul Circle to Tuas Link was resumed; however, train services between Joo Koon and Gul Circle remained suspended until mid-2018 to facilitate maintenance work on signalling devices.

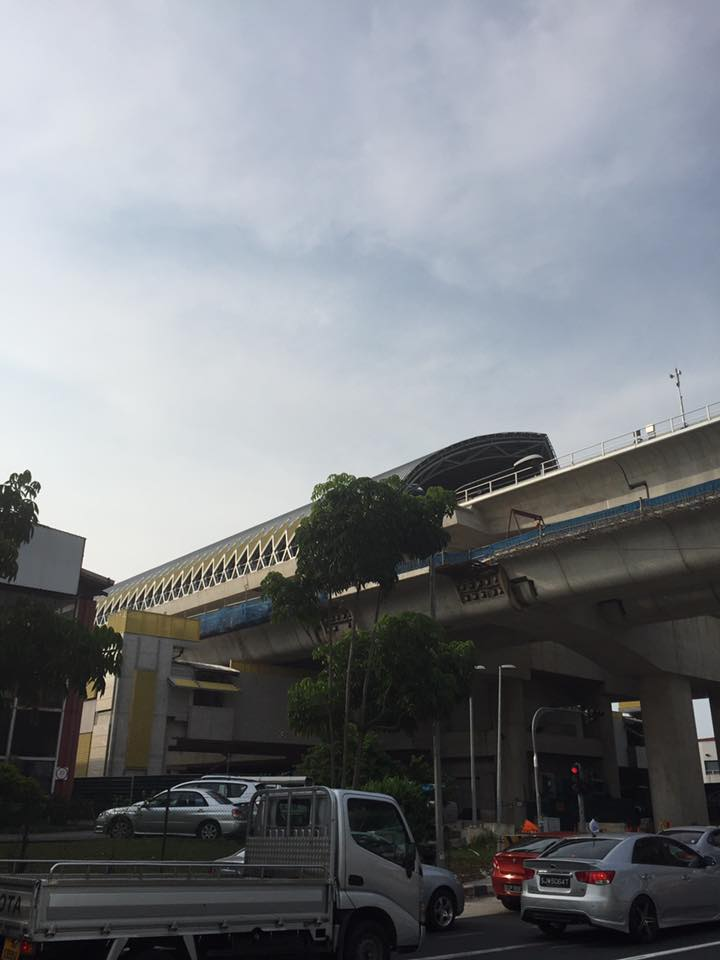
Tuas Crescent MRT station nearing completion
