= Tuas West Road MRT station =

Mass Rapid Transit station in Singapore

Tuas West Road EW32 大士西路 துவாஸ் வெஸ்ட் ரோடு
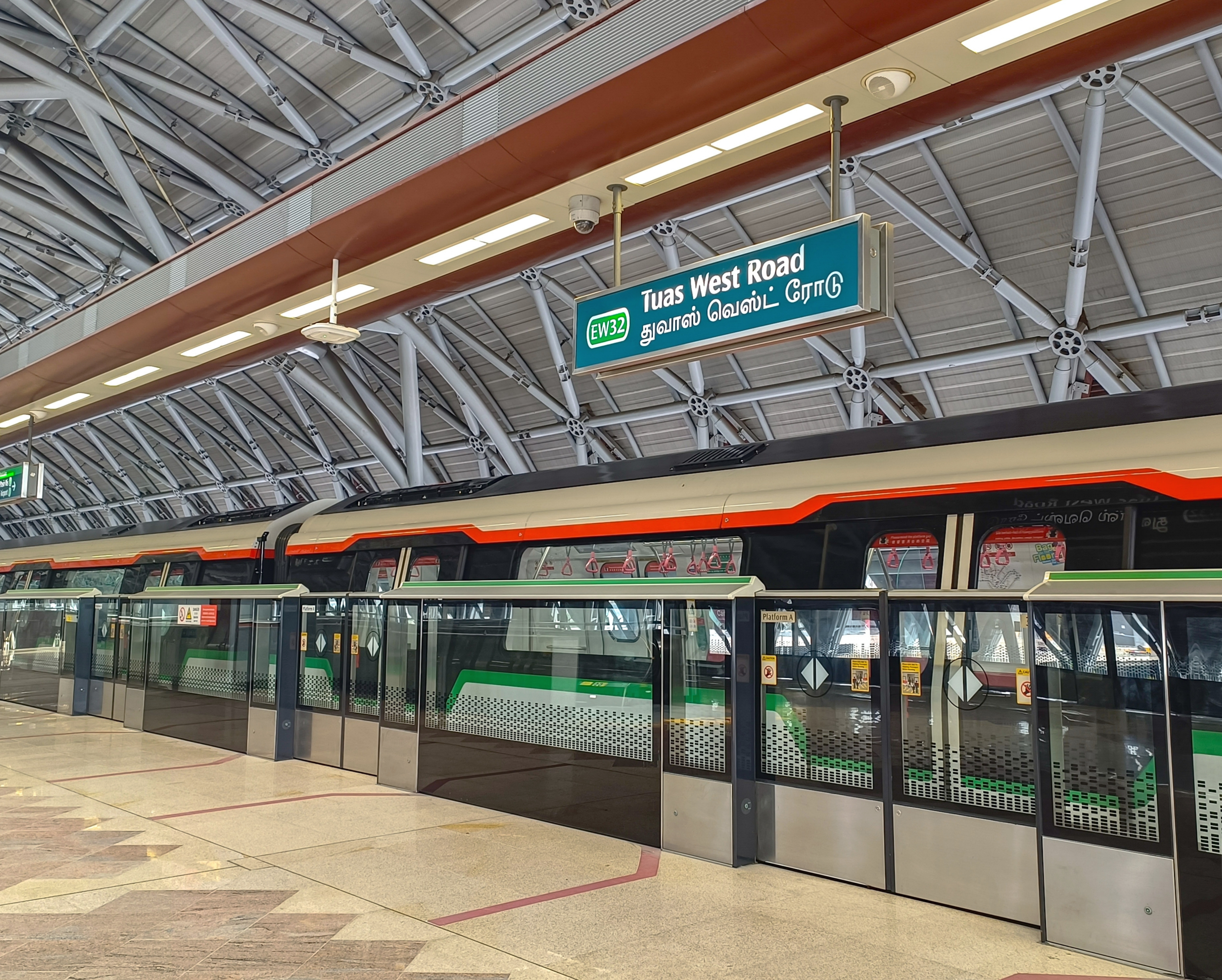
- Platform B of Tuas West Road station.

General information
- Location: 131 Pioneer Road; Singapore 639609
- Coordinates: 1°19′48.2″N 103°38′22.6″E
- System: Mass Rapid Transit (MRT) station
- Operator: SMRT Trains Ltd (SMRT Corporation)
- Tracks: 2
- Connections: Bus, Taxi

Construction
- Structure type: Elevated
- Platform levels: 1
- Cycle facilities: Yes

History
- Opened: 18 June 2017; 9 years ago
- Former names: Tuas West

Passengers
- June 2024: 4,968 per day

Services
Preceding station	Mass Rapid Transit	Following station
Tuas Crescent towards Pasir Ris	East–West Line	Tuas Link Terminus
Track layout
Location
- Location within Singapore Rail

Tuas West Road MRT station is an above-ground Mass Rapid Transit (MRT) station along the East–West Line (EWL) in Tuas, Singapore. Located along Pioneer Road, it serves nearby buildings such as Tuas Incineration Plant and Tuas Amenity Centre.

The station was announced to be part of the Tuas West Extension (TWE) of the EWL from Joo Koon station as Tuas West. Construction for the TWE began on 4 May 2012, with the station renamed to Tuas West Road following a public naming exercise. Initially expected to be completed by 2016, the TWE was pushed to the second quarter of 2017 to allow more time for the testing of a new signalling system. Tuas West Road commenced operations on 18 June 2017 along with other TWE stations.

== History ==
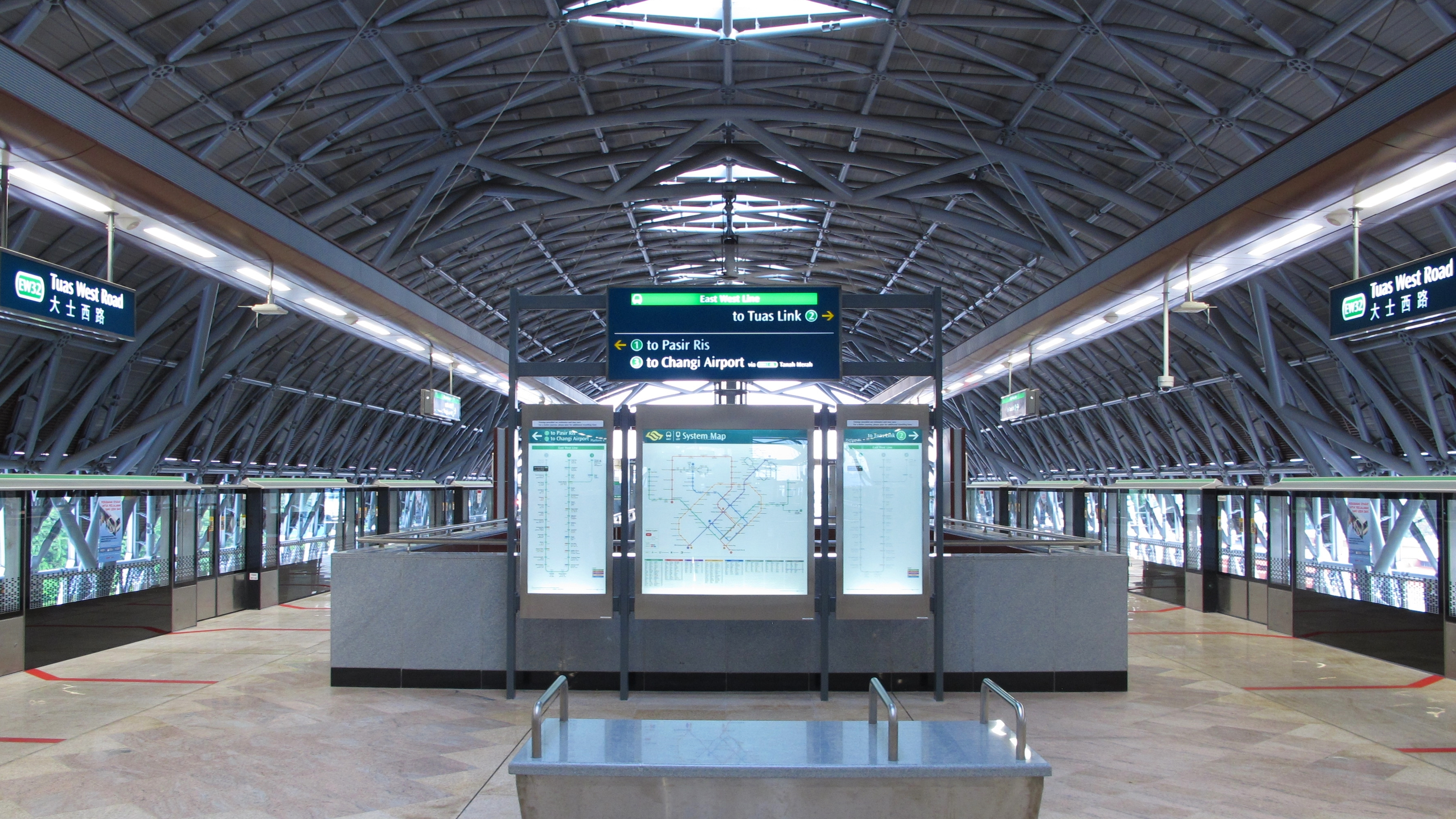
Platform level of Tuas West Road station

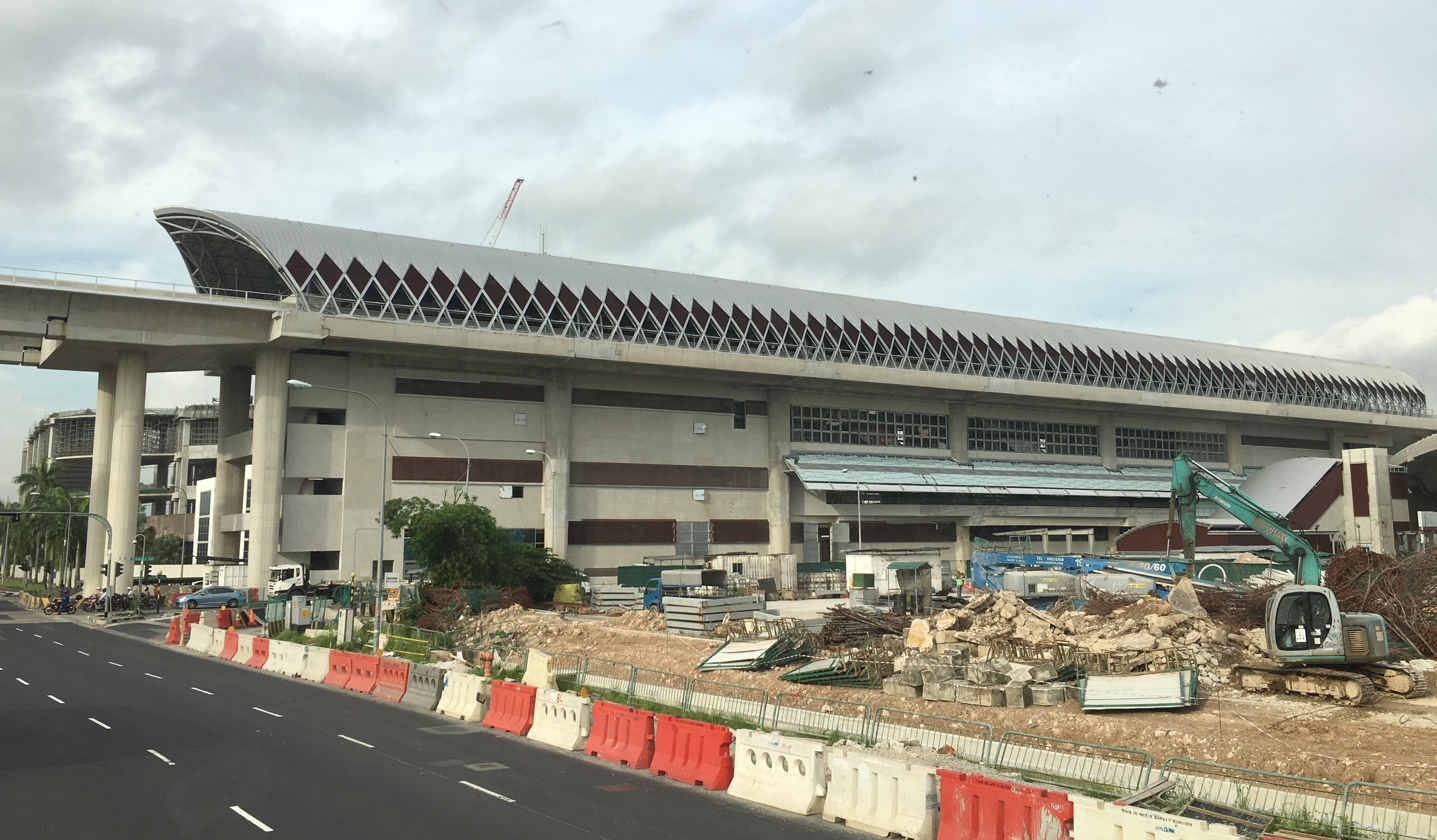
Tuas West Road MRT station nearing completion

An extension to Tuas from Joo Koon station was first announced in January 2008 by transport minister Raymond Lim to improve public transport access to Tuas and the Jurong Industrial Estate. In January 2011, the 7.5-kilometre (4.7 mi) Tuas West extension (TWE) of the East–West Line (EWL), from Gul Circle to Tuas Link stations, was announced. Tuas West was part of this extension, with expected completion by 2016. Construction of the TWE began on 4 May 2012. A public naming exercise was conducted in December, changing the name of the station to be Tuas West Road.

The TWE completion date was pushed to the second quarter of 2017 to allow more time for the testing of the new signalling system implemented for the extension. As announced by the Land Transport Authority (LTA) on 27 April 2017, the station began operations on 18 June that year. Prior to the station's opening, passengers were offered a preview of the station at an open house on 16 June.

Stations between Gul Circle to Tuas Link were temporary closed between 16 and 19 November 2017 following a collision incident that happened in Joo Koon station, later reopening on 20 November 2017. Train service between Joo Koon and Gul Circle were suspended till mid-2018 to facilitate maintenance work on signalling devices, with bridging buses deployed between the two stations. Train services resumed on 28 May 2018.

== Details ==
Tuas West Road station serves the EWL and is between Tuas Crescent and Tuas Link stations, with an official station code of EW32. As part of the EWL, the station is operated by SMRT Trains. The station operates between 5:21 am and 12:45 am on Mondays to Saturdays, though it start operations from 5:31 am for Saturdays and 5:51 am for Sundays and public holidays. Train frequencies vary from 4–10 minutes during peak hours to 8–10 for off peak hours. Running along Pioneer Road, Tuas West Road has two exits serving buildings such as Tuas Incineration Plant, Michelman Asia Pacific, and Tuas Amenity Centre. It also has two drop-off points and is wheelchair accessible.
