= Joo Koon train collision =

2017 train collision in Singapore

- The two trains following the collision

Details
- Date: 15 November 2017; 9 years ago approximately 8:20 a.m. (SST)
- Location: Joo Koon MRT station
- Coordinates: 1°19′40″N 103°40′43″E
- Country: Singapore
- Line: East–West Line
- Operator: SMRT Trains Ltd (SMRT Corporation)
- Incident type: Train collision
- Cause: Disabling of a protective bubble due to faulty track circuit

Statistics
- Trains: 2
- Passengers: 517
- Deaths: 0
- Injured: 38 (including 2 SMRT staff members)

On 15 November 2017, a moving Singapore Mass Rapid Transit (MRT) train collided with a stationary train at Joo Koon station on the East–West Line (EWL), resulting in 38 injuries. The collision was caused by a signalling fault that disabled the stationary train's protective systems, allowing the second train to approach without detecting it properly when the stationary train was being detrained.

At the time, the EWL was transitioning from fixed block signalling to communications-based train control (CBTC), requiring both systems to operate concurrently. The collision was the second involving two MRT trains after the Clementi rail accident in 1993. Investigations on the incident were concluded on 18 December. Following the incident, the Tuas West Extension (from Gul Circle station to Tuas Link station) was separated from the EWL to reduce operational complexity, while resignalling works were accelerated before the EWL fully transitioned to CBTC in May 2018.

== Background ==
Joo Koon station was constructed as part of the East–West Line (EWL) Boon Lay Extension, which opened on 28 February 2009. The EWL is operated by SMRT Trains. The signalling systems on the EWL and the North–South Line (NSL) were being upgraded from fixed block signalling to communications based train control (CBTC) to allow shorter train intervals while maintaining operational safety. The project was awarded to Thales Solutions Asia Pte Ltd for S$195 million. The new signalling system was first tested and installed on the NSL in May 2017, which resulted in signalling faults and rush-hour delays in June. A software update was expected to address the glitches.

The Tuas West Extension (TWE), which comprises the EWL segment from Gul Circle to Tuas Link, opened on 18 June 2017 and operates on the new signalling system. The installation of the new signalling system on the entire EWL was expected to be completed by 2018. Trains would transition between the legacy system and the new CBTC system on the TWE at Pioneer station. At the time of the incident, the new CBTC system between Pasir Ris and Pioneer was operating in a passive data-collection mode. Singapore's Transport Minister Khaw Boon Wan had intended for a "seamless link" between Pasir Ris and Tuas Link.

== Incident ==
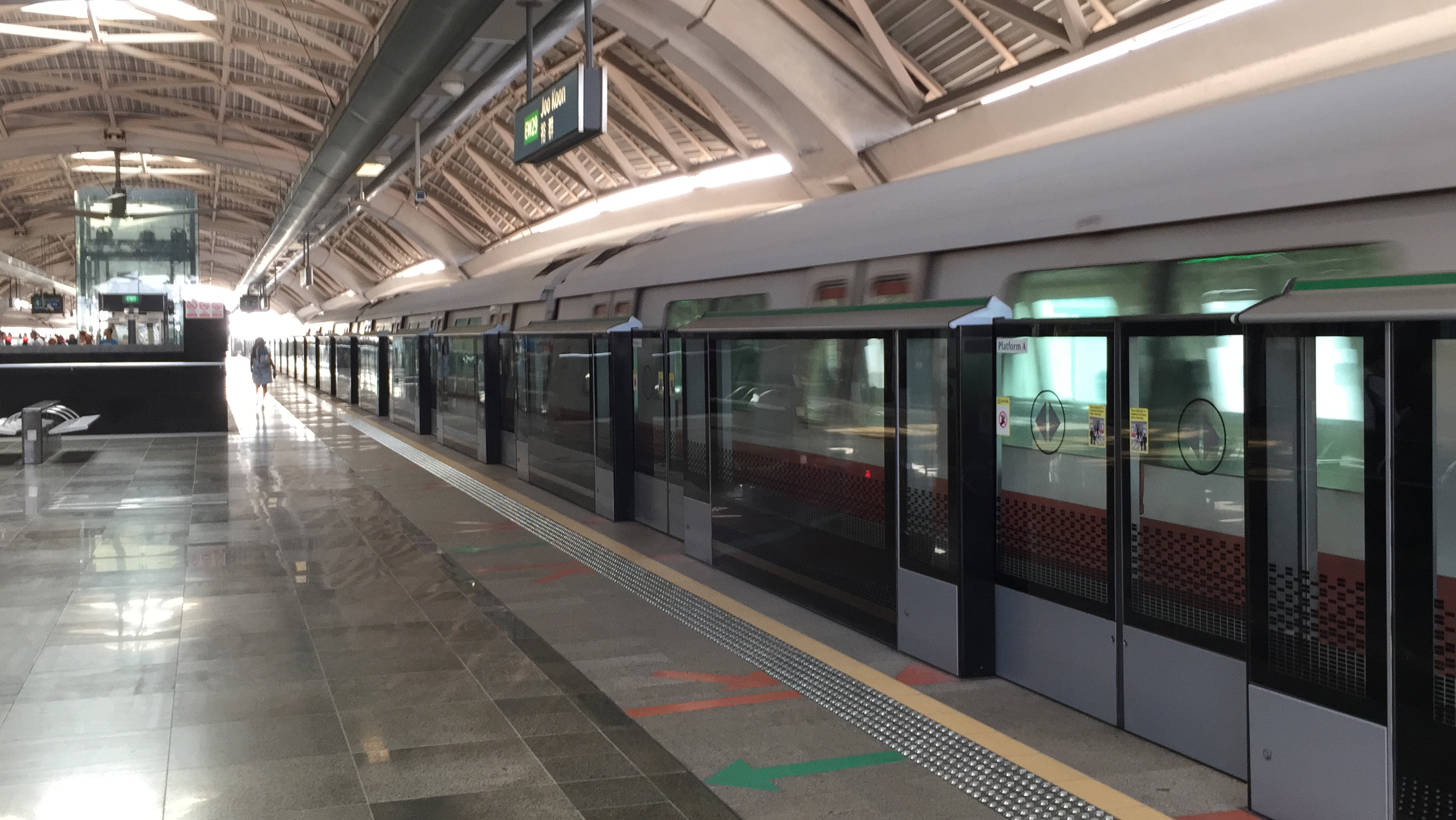
The westbound platform of Joo Koon station, where the incident took place

At about 8:18 a.m. Singapore Time on 15 November 2017, an MRT train bound for Tuas Link stalled at Joo Koon station. Due to an anomaly in the train signalling system, the passengers of the stalled train had to disembark. After the train unloaded its passengers, a second train, which stopped 36 m (118 ft) behind it, subsequently moved forward and collided with the stalled train. (Note: SMRT and Land Transport Authority (LTA) initially said the second train "came into contact" with the first train.) The second train had 517 passengers. A witness on the affected train said that about 70 per cent of passengers, including himself, were thrown to the floor by the sudden stop. Other witnesses reported screaming, vomiting and crying following the collision. While there was initial panic, the passengers subsequently began comforting and assisting one another. A commuter who had alighted from the stationary train described hearing a loud bang that sounded like a car accident.

The train remained stationary for 20 minutes, during which passengers asked SMRT staff to open the doors of the first carriage to allow them onto the platform. However, this was not possible as all the doors would have to be opened. Passengers were subsequently evacuated through the driver's cabin. Twenty-nine people, including the train captain, were injured in the collision. One passenger fainted due to low blood sugar, while another sustained a facial injury and a broken tooth. The injured were taken to Ng Teng Fong Hospital and National University Hospital. On 19 November, the number of reported injuries from the incident rose to 38. (Note: This included two SMRT staff members.)

SMRT Trains initially reported a 20-minute delay on the EWL between Jurong East and Joo Koon at 8:25 a.m., citing a train fault at Joo Koon. The Singapore Civil Defence Force was alerted at 8:33 a.m. SMRT extended the estimated delay to 30 minutes at 8:37 a.m. and later announced at 9:26 a.m. that the disruption affected services between Queenstown and Tuas Link stations. SMRT and the Land Transport Authority (LTA) confirmed the incident in a joint statement at 11:12 a.m. At 2 p.m., SMRT announced the suspension of train services between Joo Koon and Tuas Link to allow the removal of the affected trains. Free regular bus and bridging bus services were offered between the two stations. One train was towed towards Tuas Link station, while the other was moved off at 4:06 p.m. At 5:15 p.m., SMRT said services between Boon Lay and Tuas Link had resumed at reduced speed. By 5:45 p.m., commuters were advised to seek alternative transport or allow an additional 25 minutes when travelling on the NSL, with free bridging buses operating between Bishan and Yishun. About 12,930 commuters were affected by the disruption. This was the second train collision on the Singapore MRT system, with the first being the Clementi rail accident in 1993.

== Reactions ==
The Ministry of Transport, LTA and SMRT pledged to assist the injured passengers, including those seeking medical help later. Transport Minister Khaw described the incident as an "awful day", apologising for the disruption and injuries sustained by commuters. When asked whether the collision, which followed the Bishan tunnel flooding in October, had undermined public confidence in the MRT system, Khaw said that commuters would be upset and that he was "equally upset". Minister for Home Affairs K. Shanmugam said that the train incidents had "sorely tested the public mood" but expressed confidence that Khaw was able to "sort things out". Singapore Prime Minister Lee Hsien Loong also acknowledged on 19 November that the tunnel flooding and the train collision have "hurt public confidence a lot". He reaffirmed the government's commitment to improving Singapore's public transport and called for the incidents to be investigated thoroughly, with lessons drawn and their underlying causes addressed. On 21 November, Thales apologised for the incident and said it would take full responsibility for its part in the collision, while assuring the safety and security of its CBTC system.

The Workers' Party called for a thorough investigation into the incident, saying that it reflected "a failure of the systems that ought to prevent such an event". The Singapore Democratic Party called for Khaw's resignation as Transport Minister, claiming that the collision exposed "a systemic failure" in management led by Khaw. The Straits Times reporter Christopher Tan and several readers of Channel NewsAsia criticised the authorities' earlier description of the collision as the trains having "come into contact" and argued that the phrase downplayed the severity of the incident. LTA later described the incident as a "collision". Various memes on the incident that criticised SMRT and its senior management also emerged.

== Investigations ==
Transport experts described the collision as a serious incident and called for the root cause to be identified. Assistant Professor Andrew Ng from the Singapore Institute of Technology suggested that a signalling software bug could have caused the second train to receive an incorrect command or fail to detect the first train, while noting that trains require some distance to stop. Lawrence Loh of the National University of Singapore expressed concern for the injuries and called for a "bold relook" to resolve the MRT disruptions.

At a joint press conference on 15 November, LTA, SMRT and Thales said the first train's software protection feature had been "inadvertently removed" when it passed a faulty signalling circuit. The train subsequently transmitted a three-car train profile to the new signalling system instead of its actual six-car profile. The software bug had previously been identified during tests when communications between onboard computers on a train were interrupted. Khaw advised SMRT and LTA to suspend train services on the TWE to allow thorough inspections by Thales, noting that this was the first major incident involving the new signalling system. He added he was disturbed by the initial findings that a defective trackside device could disable "critical safety software".

On 16 November, LTA and SMRT decided the TWE would operate separately from the rest of the EWL for a month to allow further checks. Thales also confirmed that both the old and new signalling systems were safe for operations. TWE services were to remain suspended until 19 November. Free bus bridging services were deployed during the suspension, while the two-minute train frequencies on the NSL and EWL were lengthened to three minutes.

A subsequent finding released on 21 November found that the first train encountered an anomaly with its onboard CBTC equipment while travelling eastward from Ulu Pandan Depot, disabling one of the protective "bubbles" used to maintain a safe distance between trains. A second protective bubble, which should have replaced it, was removed when the train passed a trackside device at Clementi station. (Note: The second bubble is known as a “Non-Communicating Obstruction (NCO)". The trackside device, labelled W210B, is a track point located west of Clementi station.) The anomaly was detected at Pioneer station, and the train captain reported it to the Operations Control Centre. The train was driven manually to Joo Koon station, where the platform screen doors were opened manually to unload passengers and prevent other trains from entering. However, closing the doors removed the "closed track" protection. This allowed the second train, which was operating automatically, to move forward because it did not detect a protective bubble around the first train, resulting in the collision. SMRT highlighted that the 10-second window prior to impact was insufficient for the driver of the second train to react manually.

The LTA completed its investigations on 18 December, which were consistent with the findings presented on 21 November. When the train crossed the faulty trackside device, the CBTC system registered it as continuously "moving" and failed to propagate the protective bubble. Further tests by Thales found that the CBTC system would have correctly handled the condition and propagated the bubble if it had been operating in active mode at the affected track point. The track point was fixed on 16 November. Christopher Tan nevertheless questioned SMRT's handling of the incident, particularly its decision to keep the first train in automatic mode when it developed signalling problems. He also questioned Thales' confidence in operating both signalling systems concurrently and argued that the resignalling project should have been completed earlier.

== Aftermath ==
On 20 November 2017, the TWE's signalling system was isolated from the rest of the EWL to reduce the complexity of operating two signalling systems. The following day, SMRT and LTA announced that services between Joo Koon and Gul Circle would remain suspended until June 2018, with free bridging buses provided between the two stations. From 8 to 31 December, sections between Tiong Bahru and Tuas Link, as well as Bukit Batok and Bukit Gombak on the NSL, were also scheduled for earlier closures on Friday and Saturday evenings and later openings on Saturdays and Sundays to accelerate EWL resignalling works. These sections were also scheduled to close for the full day on 10 and 17 December. (Note: Bukit Batok and Bukit Gombak were affected as the engineering works would include Jurong East station, a major interchange on the NSL and EWL.) Commuters interviewed by The Straits Times were dismayed by the closures due to the added inconvenience, although one hoped that "the trains will be better after this".

Further closures were scheduled in January 2018, affecting services between Paya Lebar, Pasir Ris and Changi Airport. Operating hours across the EWL continued to be shortened on every weekend in March, as well as on 12 and 14 March, to facilitate the implementation of the CBTC system in addition to rail renewal works. By March, resignalling works were 90% complete. Live testing of the new signalling system was conducted on Sundays in April and May, with train services running between Gul Circle and Joo Koon. On 24 April, a signalling simulation centre opened at Bishan Depot to help identify and diagnose software issues during testing of the new CBTC system. With the full transition of the EWL to the new CBTC signalling system, services between Gul Circle and Joo Koon resumed on 28 May 2018.

== Notes and references ==
=== Sources ===
- Executive Summary of Investigation Report into Train Collision at Joo Koon Station Westbound Platform on 15 November 2017 ("Incident") (PDF) (Report). Singapore: Land Transport Authority. 18 December 2017. Archived from the original (PDF) on 27 January 2021.

== See also ==
- Pasir Ris rail accident, a fatal accident where a train struck track maintenance workers
- Tsuen Wan line accident, a non-fatal accident involving CBTC testing by MTR Corporation
