= Tuas Bus Terminal =

Bus terminal located in Tuas, Singapore

Tuas Bus Terminal 大士巴士终站 Terminal Bas Tuas
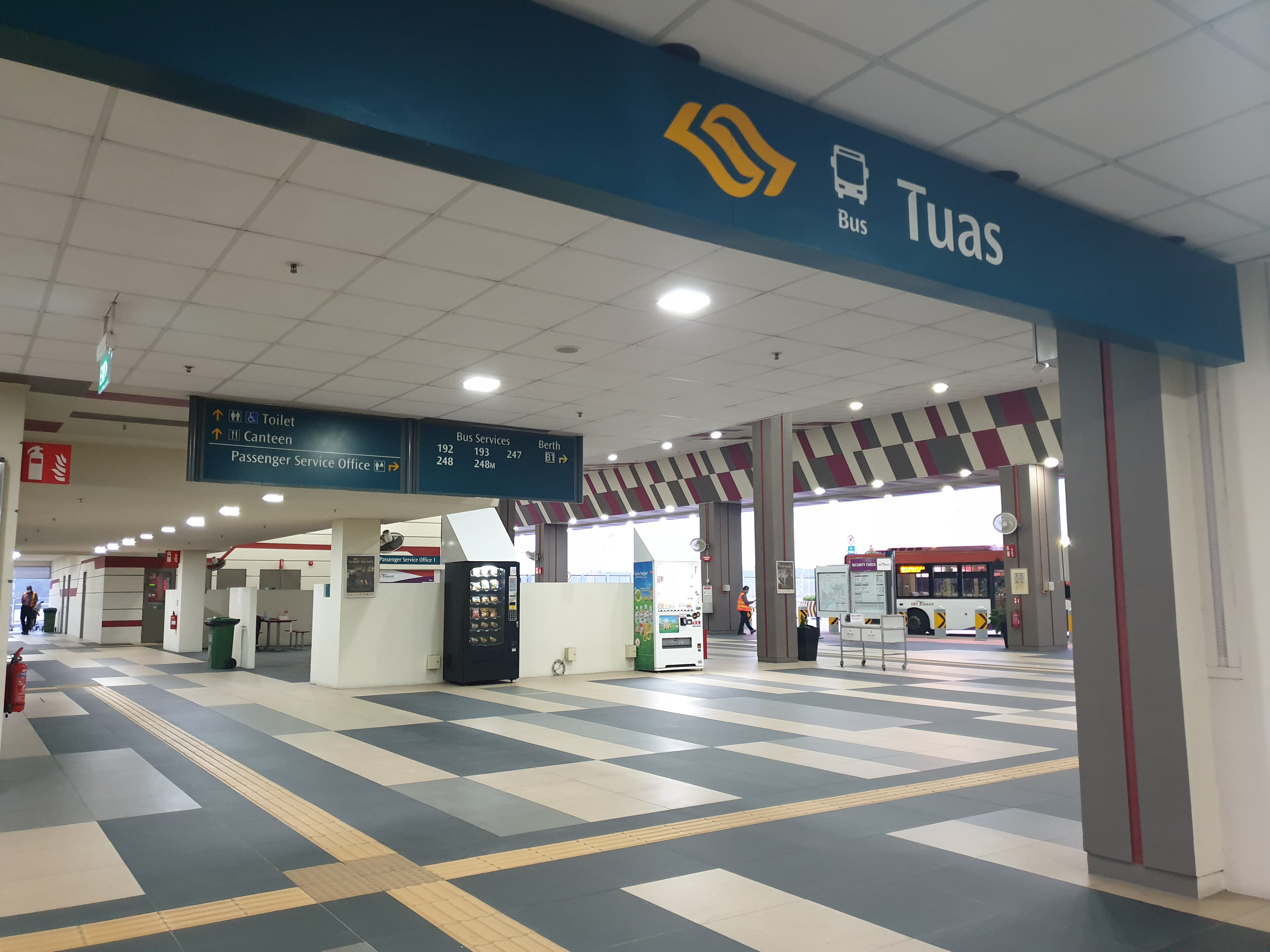
- Entrance of Tuas Bus Terminal.

General information
- Location: 3 Tuas West Drive, Singapore 638419
- System: Public Bus Terminal
- Owner: Land Transport Authority
- Operator: SMRT Buses Ltd (SMRT Corporation)
- Bus routes: 5 (SMRT Buses)
- Bus stands: 1 boarding berth 2 alighting berths
- Bus operators: SMRT Buses Ltd
- Connections: EW33 Tuas Link

Construction
- Structure type: At-grade
- Accessible: Accessible alighting/boarding points Accessible public toilets Graduated kerb edges Tactile guidance system

History
- Opening: 2 January 1998; 28 years ago (Old location); 7 October 2017; 8 years ago (New location)
- Closed: 6 October 2017; 8 years ago (Old location)

Key dates
- 2 January 1998: Commenced operations
- 7 October 2017: Operations transferred to new site
- 15 September 2024: Operations transferred to SMRT Buses

Tuas Bus Terminal is a bus terminal located in Tuas in the western part of Singapore. This terminal serves industrial workers at Jurong Industrial Estate and Tuas Industrial Estate from Boon Lay Bus Interchange. It is connected to the Tuas Link MRT station, allowing for convenient transfers.

== History ==
The terminal was relocated to a new site above the Tuas Depot on 7 October 2017. On 18 June 2017, 2 new services, Bus Services 247 and 248, were introduced in conjunction with the Tuas West MRT Extension opening. On 7 October 2017, all 4 services were relocated to the new site.

In January 2024, a contract was awarded to TOA Corporation for the construction of the Tuas Transport Hub, serving as a new bus terminal for the area. Construction of the bus terminal is projected to be completed in April 2025.

== Bus Contracting Model ==
Under the Bus Contracting Model, all bus services operating from Tuas Bus Terminal are under Jurong West Bus Package, operated by the anchor operator, SMRT Buses Ltd.

=== List of Bus Services ===
Operator	Package	Routes
SMRT Buses	Jurong West	192, 193, 247, 248, 248M
