= Braddell MRT station =

Mass Rapid Transit station in Singapore

Braddell NS18 布莱德 பிரேடல்
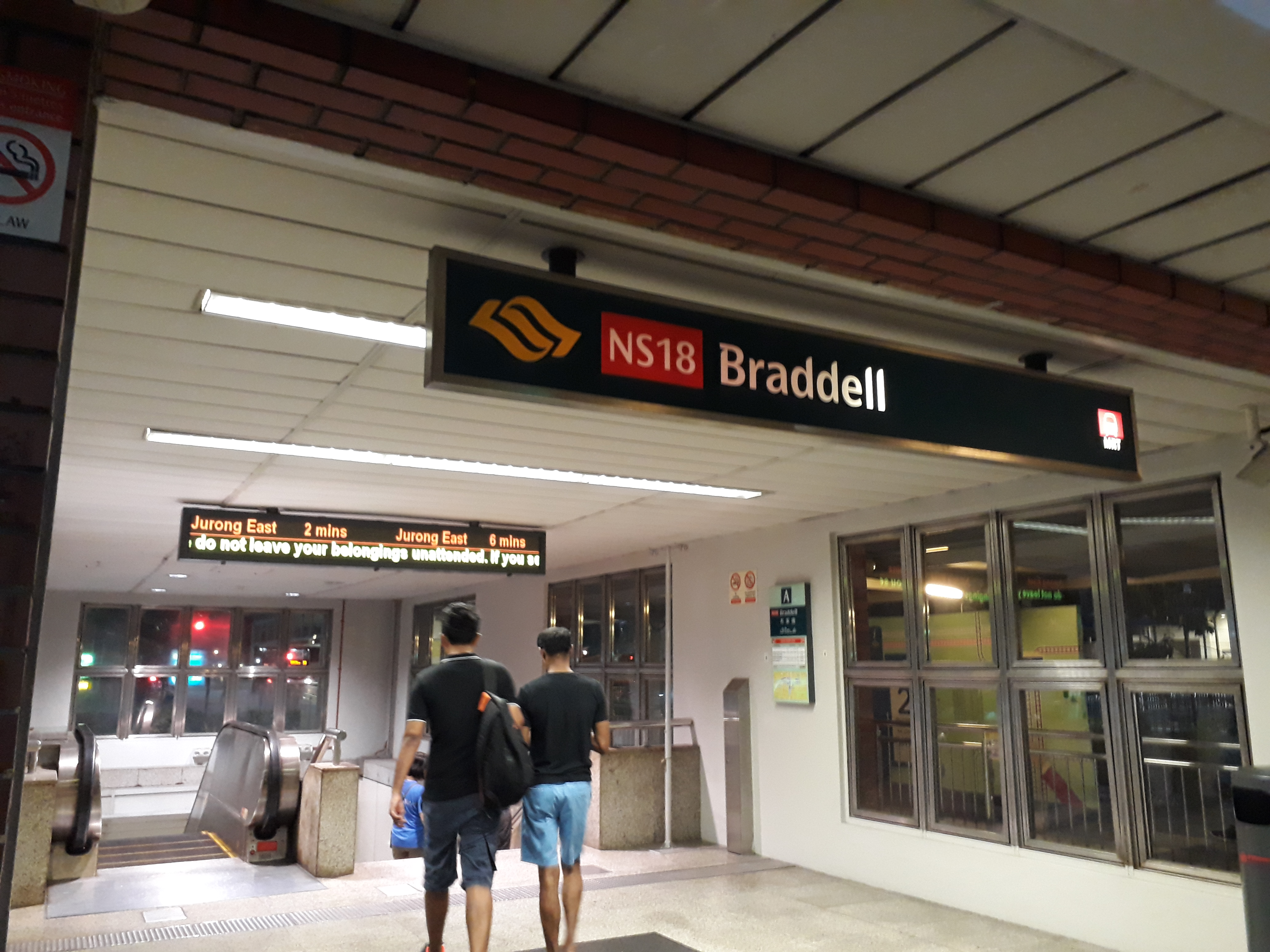
- Exit A of Braddell MRT station.

General information
- Location: 377 Lorong 1 Toa Payoh, Singapore 319756
- Coordinates: 01°20′25.22″N 103°50′48.21″E
- System: Mass Rapid Transit (MRT) station
- Owner: Land Transport Authority
- Operator: SMRT Trains
- Line: North–South Line
- Platforms: 2 (2 side platforms)
- Tracks: 2
- Connections: Bus, Taxi

Construction
- Structure type: Underground
- Platform levels: 1
- Accessible: Yes

Other information
- Station code: BDL

History
- Opened: 7 November 1987; 38 years ago

Passengers
- June 2024: 13,337 per day

Services
Preceding station	Mass Rapid Transit	Following station
Bishan towards Jurong East	North–South Line	Toa Payoh towards Marina South Pier
Track layout
Location
- Location within Singapore Rail central area

Braddell MRT station is an underground Mass Rapid Transit (MRT) station located on the North–South Line (NSL) in Toa Payoh, Singapore. Due to engineering constraints, it and Canberra station are the only stations on the NSL to have side platforms. Located underneath the traffic junction of Lorong 1 Toa Payoh and Lorong 2 Toa Payoh, Braddell station primarily serves the estates in the northern part of Toa Payoh New Town. Its official station code is NS18, formerly N7.

Opened on 7 November 1987, Braddell station is one of the first five MRT stations on the network. The station is within walking distance to 3 condominiums, Trevista, Gem Residences and Orie.

== History ==
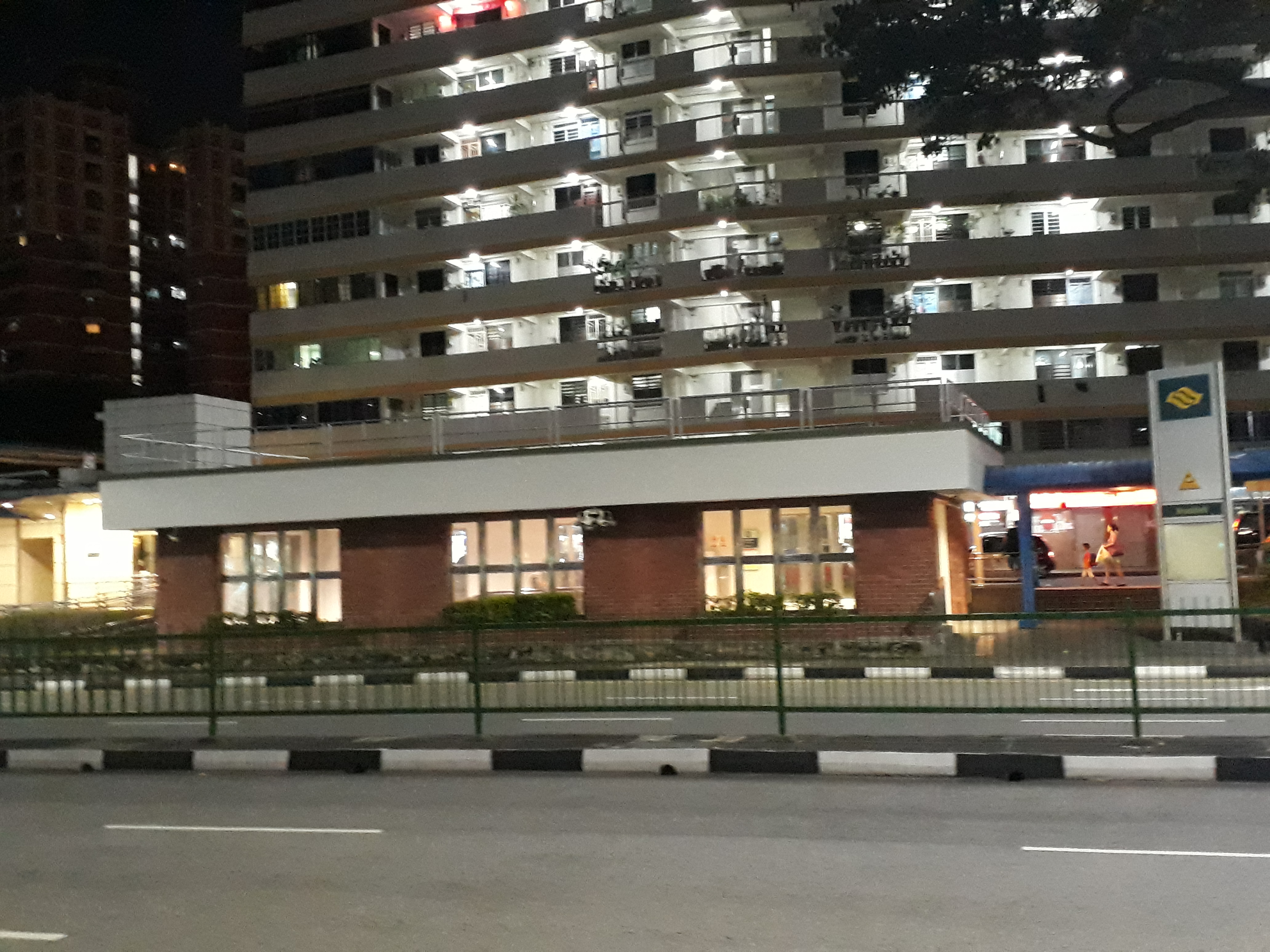
Exit B of Braddell MRT station at night.

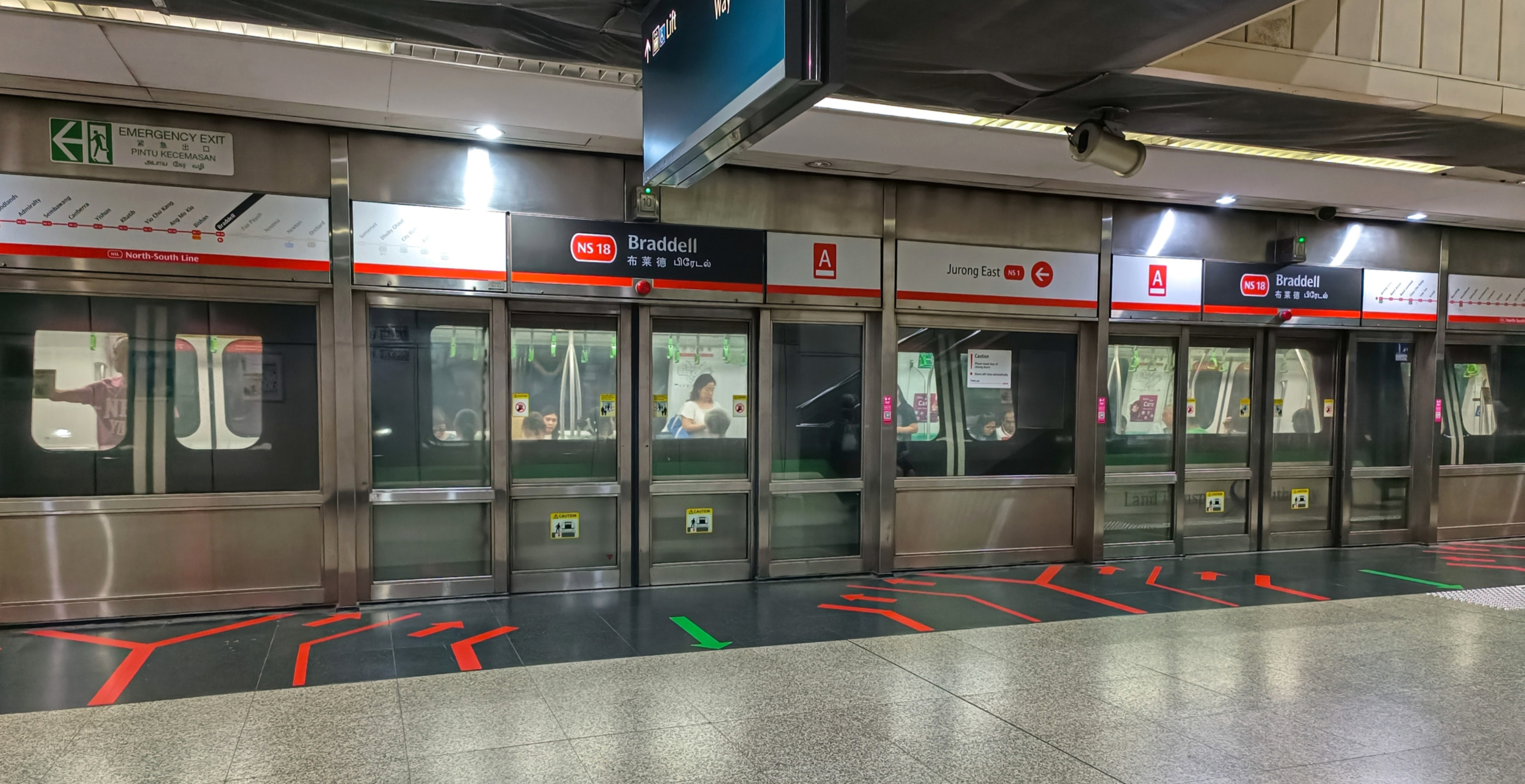
Platform A of Braddell MRT.

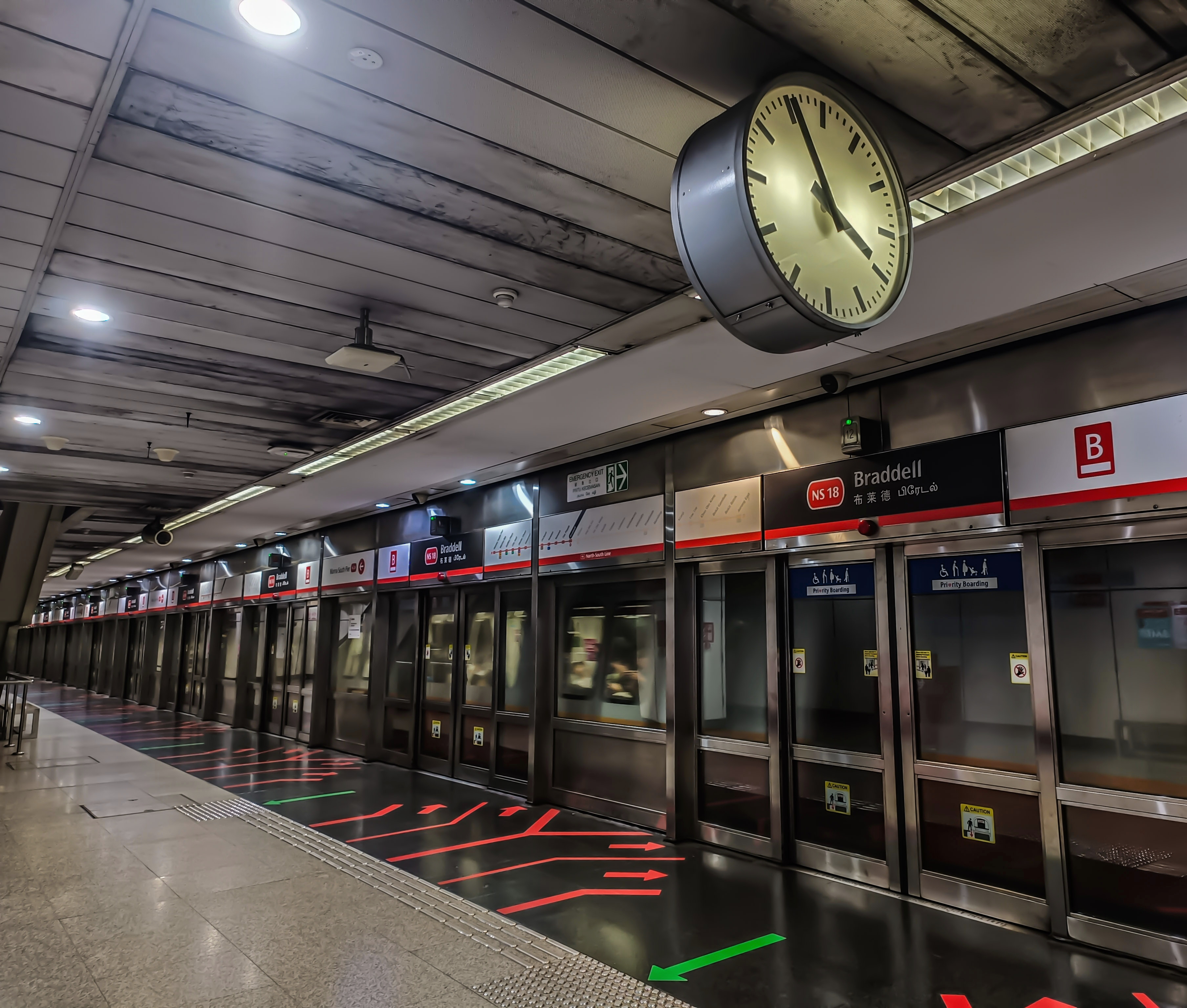
Platform B of Braddell MRT.

When the MRT system was under planning in 1981, MRT Corporation tried to design the track system and position in order to enable the station to have a common platform, like in the mainstream MRT stations. However, the closely built HDB Blocks in Toa Payoh estate meant that the MRT system tunnels had to be constructed directly under Lorong 2 Toa Payoh, following the bend of the road, in the area between Lorong 1 Toa Payoh and Toa Payoh MRT Station. The result made it impossible for tracks to diverge at a common platform station, as the angle Southbound trains would turn when approaching and leaving the station would be too great. Additionally, it would be unfeasible to change the position of the station, because moving it south would render it too close to Toa Payoh MRT station, while moving it north would be impossible because of surrounding HDB blocks and JTC factories. It was thus built with side platforms unlike other NSL stations. Construction of this station was awarded to Singapore Belgium Contractors Limited under Contract 103A on 7 April 1984. To facilitate the construction, two of the six lanes at Toa Payoh Lorong 1 and 2, were temporarily closed from February 1985 to February 1986. Braddell was among the first of five stations opened for operation on 7 November 1987.

=== Incidents ===
On 7 October 2017, water got into a section of the tunnel between Bishan and Braddell MRT stations during a heavy downpour in the afternoon, which disrupted train services along 13 stations on the North–South Line for several hours. This case of water entering MRT tunnels is believed to be the first time it has affected train service along the NSL. Separately, at about 5.55 pm, a small fire was spotted trackside in the tunnel between the Marina Bay and Raffles Place stations, but it had died down by itself. It is not clear if it is linked to the flood, although electrical short circuits caused by water had sparked tunnel fires before. Train services between Marina South Pier and Newton were restored on the day itself at about 9.20 pm. Train services between Newton and Ang Mo Kio were fully resumed at 1.36 pm the following day after overnight efforts to clear the water in the tunnel, after nearly 21 hours of service disruption, being one of the worst disruptions in SMRT Trains Ltd's history. It was revealed that the overflowing in the tunnel was caused by a malfunction in the water pumping system, which has since been repaired.
