= Tuas View =

- Subzone of Tuas Planning Area

Name transcription(s)
  - Chinese: 大士南
  - Pinyin: da2 shi4 nan2
  - Malay: Tuas Lihat
  - Tamil: தெற்குத் துவாஸ்
- Country: Singapore
- Planning area: Tuas Planning Area

Tuas View is an industrial area in the south-westernmost region of Singapore.

It is located to the south-west of Tuas Crescent and Tuas South Avenue 5.

It is a reclaimed land of 2,880 ha size.

It is home to some of the world's largest pharmaceutical companies like GlaxoSmithKline and Pfizer. The Tuas Marine Transfer Station located on the western shores will transport the island's incinerated wastes to Pulau Semakau for landfills. Furthermore, the world's largest tunnel for storage of oil is being built in the south of extension. Two of the four incinerators in Singapore are also located in Tuas View. Currently land reclamation is being carried out in the southern side of Tuas View in which it will stretch near to the sea border with Indonesia and it will be the southernmost point of Singapore mainland.

== Bus routes ==
SBS Transit Service 182 plies through Tuas View.
