= Bishan MRT tunnel flooding =

2017 flooding incident in Singapore

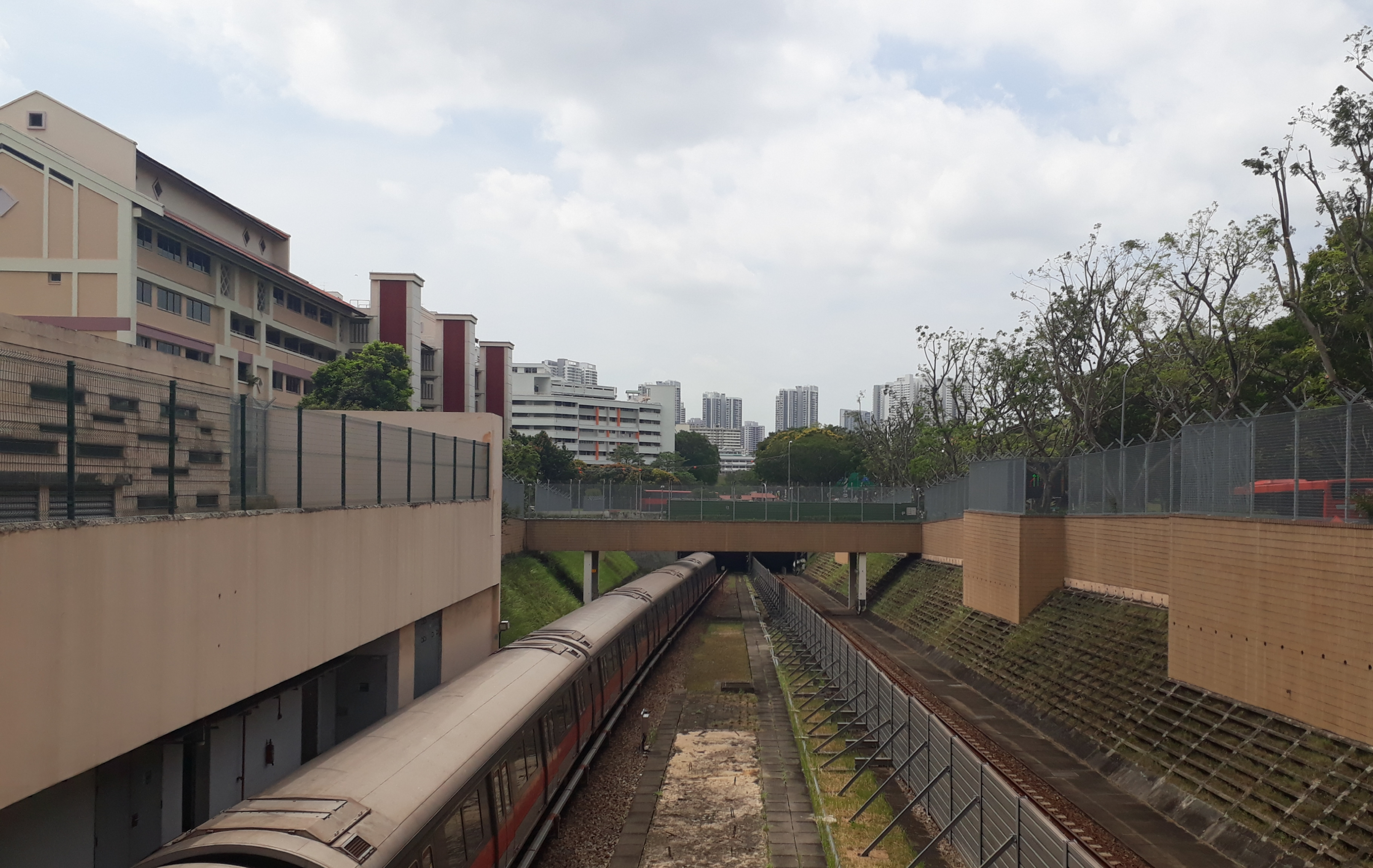
- Tracks leading out from the station to the tunnel in the distance.

Details
- Date: 7 October 2017; 9 years ago
- Location: Between Bishan MRT station and Braddell MRT station
- Coordinates: 1.348542°N 103.8475287°E
- Country: Singapore
- Line: North–South Line
- Operator: SMRT Trains Ltd (SMRT Corporation)
- Incident type: Flooding
- Cause: Human error (malfunction in the water pumping system)

Statistics
- Deaths: 0
- Injured: 0
- Damage: S$2 million

On 7 October 2017, tunnels were flooded between the Bishan and Braddell stations of Singapore's Mass Rapid Transit (MRT). The flooding, caused by heavy rain and a faulty maintenance pump, completely blocked the tunnels, and bus services had to be deployed while the Singapore Civil Defence Force and maintenance staff drained the tunnels. The incident caused more than S$2 million in damages and lost revenue for the operator SMRT, and led to the firing of eight maintenance employees.

== Background ==
The section of flooded tunnels between Bishan and Braddell was part of the first section of the system to open. At the time of the incident, the system was going through a turbulent period plagued with multiple disruptions and delays which caused public displeasure, and this incident further aggravated the situation. Earlier in the day, there was a lunchtime delay on the North East Line, and in the previous month, service on the Bukit Panjang LRT line was disrupted.

== Incident ==
At 5:33 p.m. on 7 October 2017, heavy rain flooded the tunnels between the Bishan and Braddell MRT stations. In addition, a small trackside fire, whose cause is still unknown, was spotted by a train driver between Raffles Place MRT station and Marina Bay MRT station. This prompted the train's operator, SMRT, to suspend all service from Ang Mo Kio to Marina South Pier. SMRT provided free bridging buses along the affected stretch of stations.

At 7:07 p.m., the Singapore Civil Defence Force (SCDF) received a call from SMRT about a flooding situation in the tunnels between the two affected stations. SMRT then officially reported the flooding on social media at 7.30 p.m. Train services were restored between the Newton and Marina South Pier stations, but not between Newton and Ang Mo Kio. SMRT also mentioned that its engineers were working with SCDF personnel to pump water out of the affected stretch of tunnels. At 1:50 p.m. the next day, SMRT said that the water had been cleared and that service would resume, and test trains were deployed to ensure passenger safety. This resulted in almost 20 hours of disruption.

== Investigation ==
Following the incident, SMRT and the Land Transport Authority (LTA) launched a joint investigation into the incident. The initial report delivered by the LTA listed three possible causes or combination of causes that could have resulted in the failure - The accumulation of silt and debris could have prevented the lowest float switch from activating or the alarm switch from triggering, or that the pumps were not set back to automatic mode after the last round of maintenance was completed. The investigation led to the uncovering of falsified maintenance records and lack of maintenance of the water pumps.

=== Aftermath ===
As a result of the incident, SMRT suffered S$2 million in damages to trackside equipment and trains. The incident prompted a check of other similar pumps around the system, two of which, at Lavender and Kembangan, were also found to be faulty. SMRT also fired eight employees from their maintenance crew — including a senior executive, two managers, and five members of the technical staff — as a result of the incident. To prevent such an incident from occurring again, the train operator introduced flood-prevention measures at four other tunnel portals along the East–West Line in 2018. These measures included installing more float switches and relocating pump control panels (used for manually activating the water pumps) to areas accessible to maintenance staff.

On 20 July 2018, SMRT was fined S$1.9 million by the LTA for the flooding and another incident at Pasir Ris MRT station, which led to the deaths of two SMRT employees.

== See also ==
- Joo Koon train collision
- Clementi rail accident
