= Pasir Ris rail accident =

2016 fatal collision in Singapore

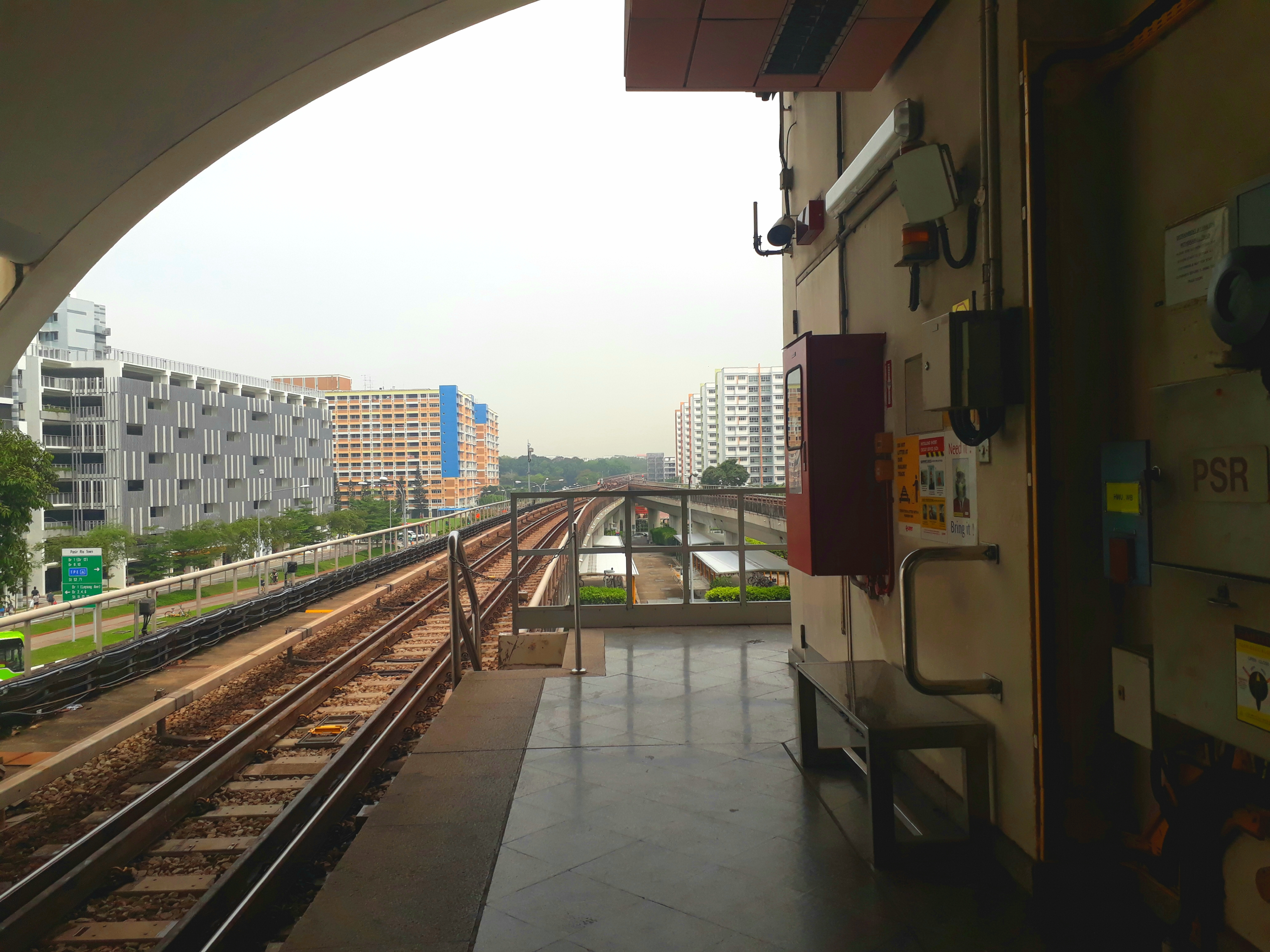
- Tracks leading out of Pasir Ris station, where the accident took place. The accident occurred at the track switch in the distance.

Details
- Date: 22 March 2016; 10 years ago
- Location: Near Pasir Ris MRT station
- Coordinates: 01°22′20.68″N 103°56′57.73″E
- Country: Singapore
- Line: East–West Line
- Operator: SMRT Trains
- Incident type: Collision with track workers on track
- Cause: Human error (failure to comply with safety procedures)

Statistics
- Trains: 1
- Deaths: 2 (SMRT staff)
- Injured: 0

On 22 March 2016, two SMRT Trains track workers, Nasrulhudin Majumudin and Muhammad Asyraf Ahmad Buhari, were killed by a train at the track switch near Pasir Ris MRT station. They were trainees and had been investigating a track point fault as part of a team of 15.

The engineer who led the inspection team was charged with negligence causing death under the Penal Code of Singapore and sentenced to 4 weeks in jail. SMRT Trains and one member of SMRT's management were charged for violating the Workplace Safety and Health Act for lapses which led to the accident, and were fined $400,000 and $55,000 respectively. On 20 July 2018, SMRT was fined S$1.9 million (US$1.41 million) for the deaths of Nasrulhudin and Buhari and a flooding incident at Bishan MRT station.

== Incident ==
The incident occurred at 11:10 a.m. on 22 March 2016, when a team of 15 track personnel was deployed to a track switch near Pasir Ris station to investigate a high voltage alarm that indicated a possible track point fault. The team walked on the side walkway beside the tracks in a single file towards the track point equipment. The two workers, Nasrulhudin Najumudin and Muhammad Asyraf Ahmad Buhari, were second and third in line. Both were trainees in SMRT Trains and the task was part of their on-the-job training. No speed restriction or ATC-code restriction was imposed on that section of track and there was no railway watchman to warn train captains of the presence of workers on track. The train involved was on automatic mode and maintained a speed of 60 kilometres per hour (37 mph).

The team had to cross over the third rail supplying trains power to access the signalling equipment. Nasrulhudin, Buhari, and the supervisor were already crossing over the rail when the senior officer in the team noticed the train and yelled, "Train is coming! The train is coming!" The train driver noticed the track workers and applied the emergency brakes. However, the train struck both Nasrulhudin and Buhari. Nasrulhudin was crushed, while Buhari was flung to the track. Both personnel suffered severe injuries and were pronounced dead at the scene. Service between Tanah Merah station and Pasir Ris was suspended as a result for more than two hours, affecting 10,000 commuters.

== Investigation ==
Investigations by SMRT Corporation revealed that there was no request to impose the safety code before the inspection team went on track to investigate the high voltage alarm. The engineer did not liaise with the duty station manager on when to impose the safety code and hence did not impose the safety code before the team was supposed to leave the station platform. The inspection team walked to the work site instead of taking a designated train to send them there. A standard printed sign to warn train drivers that there are works in progress was not displayed but a handwritten sign was displayed with no indication of personnel working on the track ahead.

== Aftermath ==
After an internal investigation, SMRT fired both the engineer who led the track team and the train driver and also disciplined the staff involved for their role in the incident. The firing of both employees attracted online controversy, with Singaporeans on social media questioning whether it was the right decision. On 2 December 2016, SMRT Trains, the director of control operations and the SMRT engineer who led the track team were charged in court for the incident. Upon investigation, it was revealed that safety protocols were not implemented that would have prevented the train from entering the worksite.

The engineer who led the inspection team was charged with negligence causing death under the Penal Code. He pleaded guilty and was sentenced to four weeks' imprisonment.

SMRT Trains and one member of SMRT management were charged for violating the Workplace Safety and Health Act for lapses which led to the accident, and were fined $400,000 and $55,000 respectively after they both pleaded guilty to their charges.

In July 2018, SMRT was fined S$1.9 million by the Land Transport Authority for the deaths of Nasrulhudin and Buhari and a flooding incident at Bishan MRT station.
