= Tuas =

Planning Area in West Region, Singapore

- Planning Area

Other transcription(s)
  - Malay: Tuas (Rumi) تواس (Jawi)
  - Chinese: 大士; Dàshì (Pinyin); Tōa-sū (Hokkien POJ)
  - Tamil: துவாஸ் Tuvās (Transliteration)
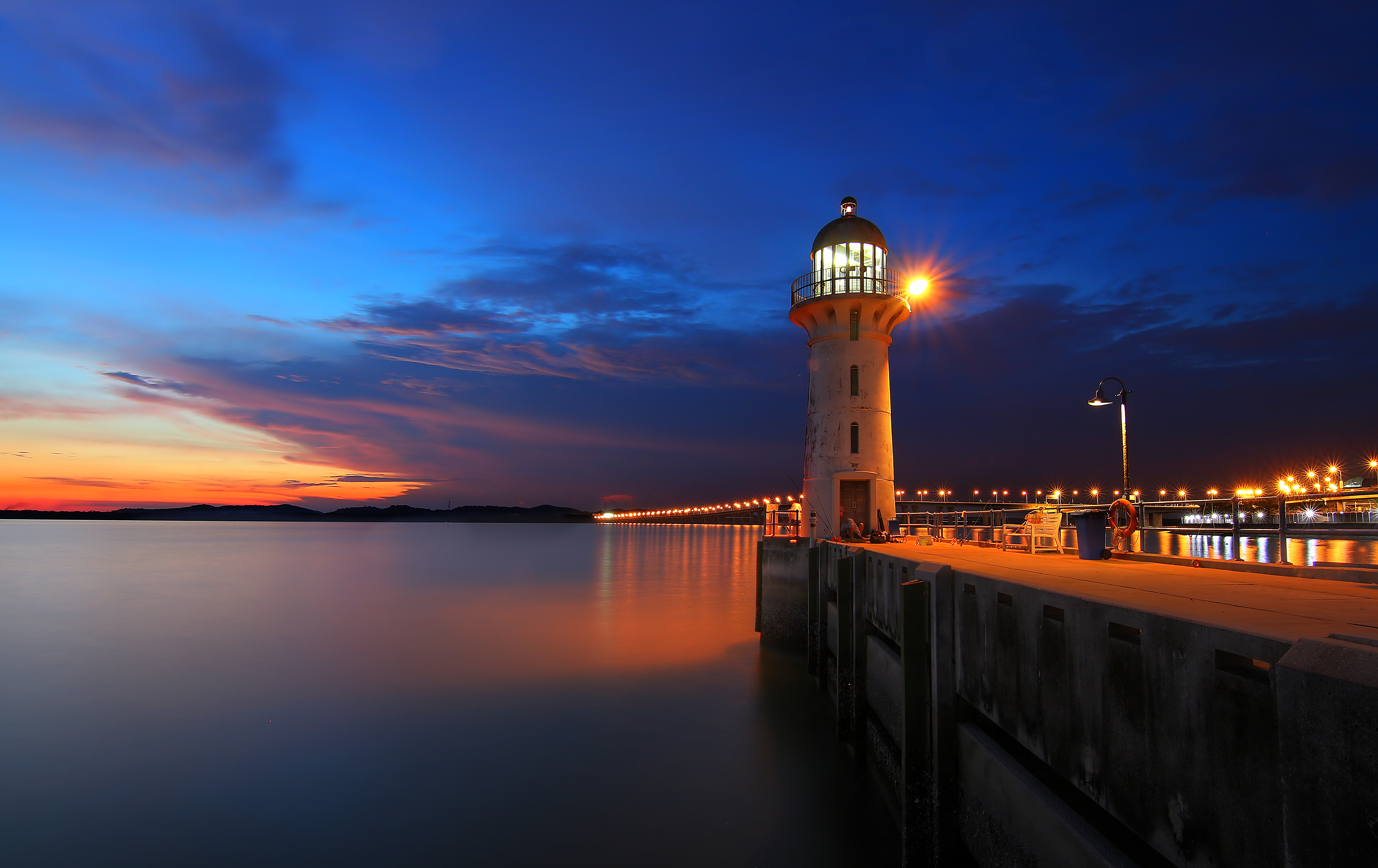
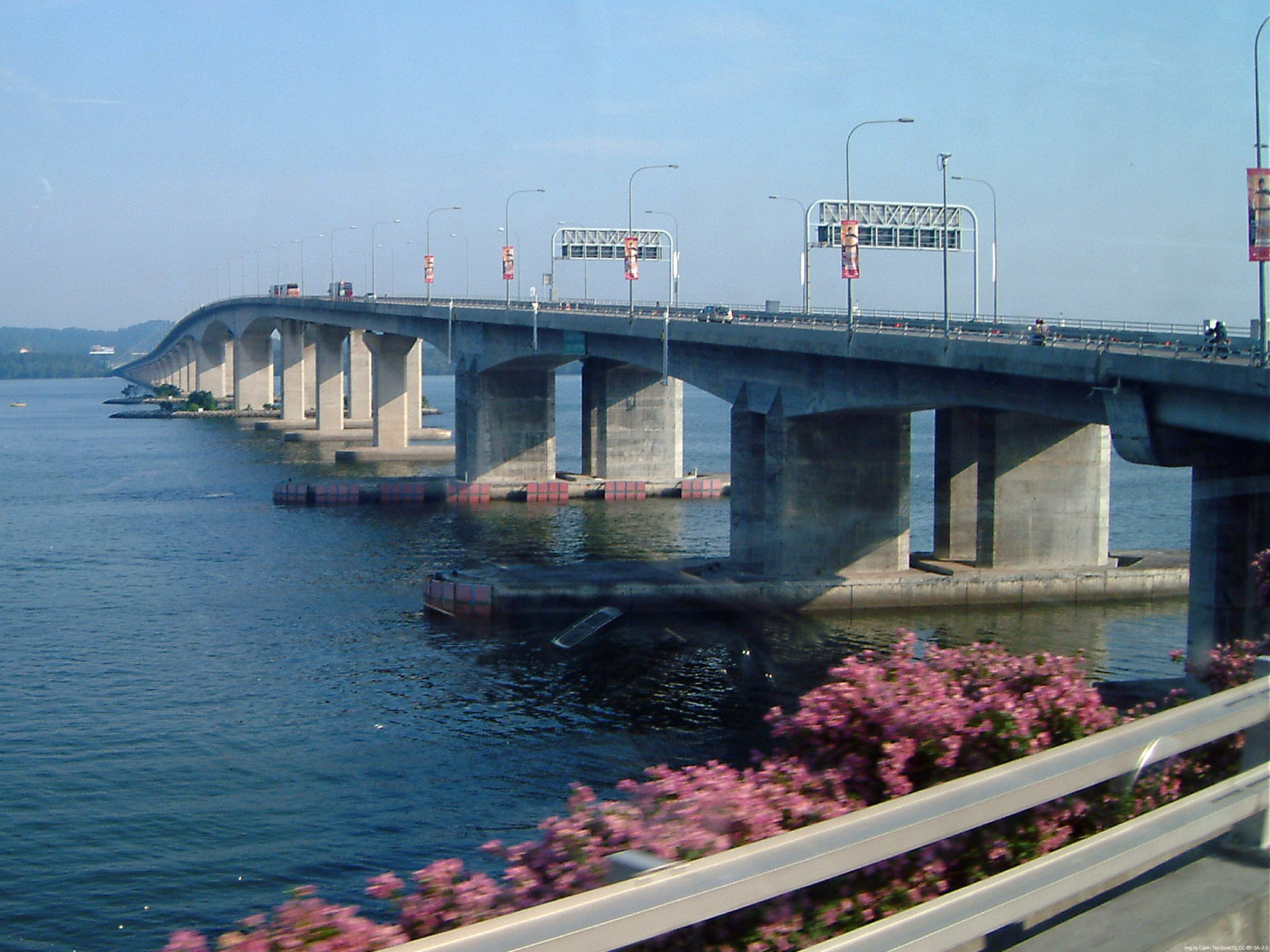
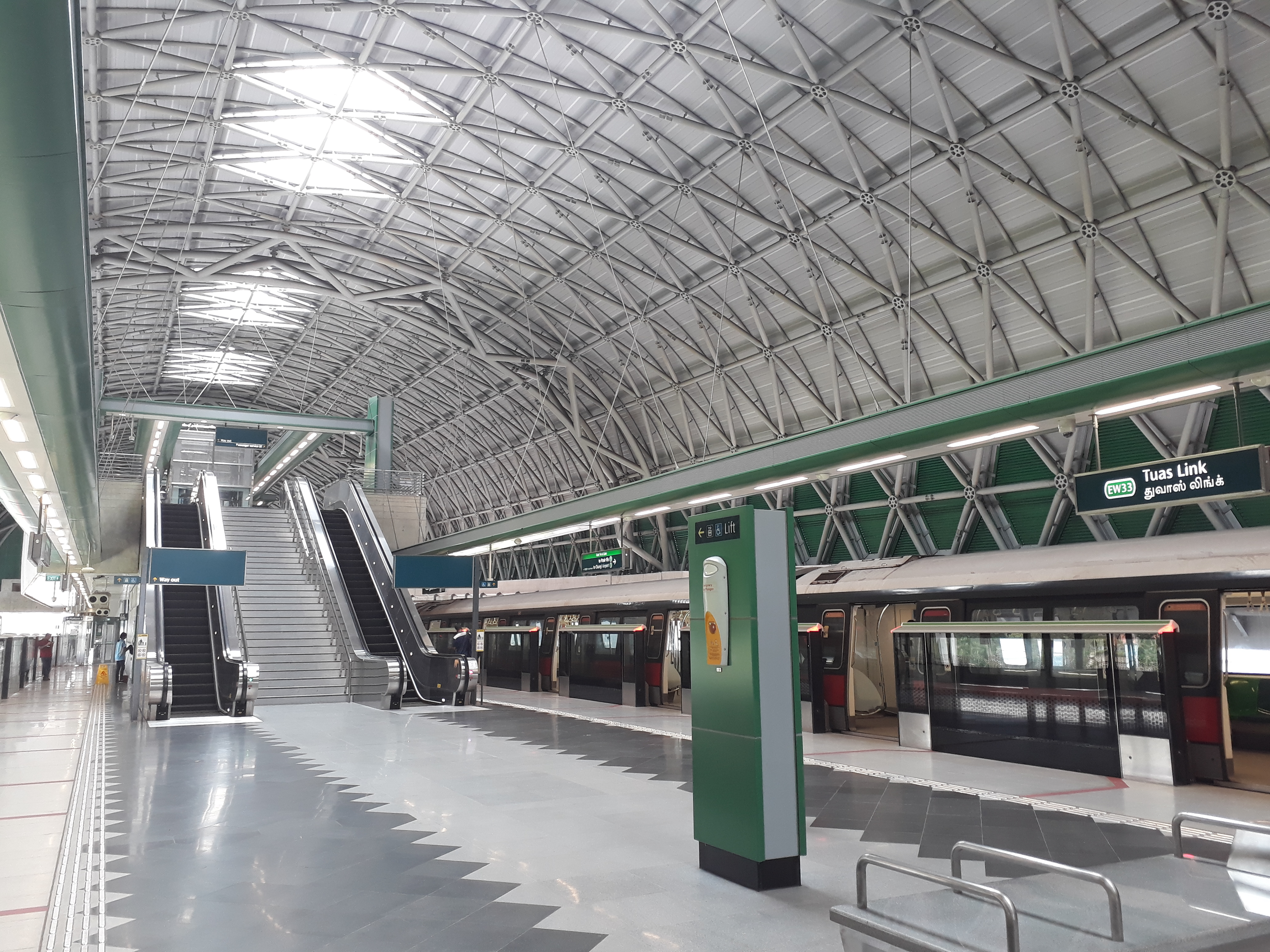
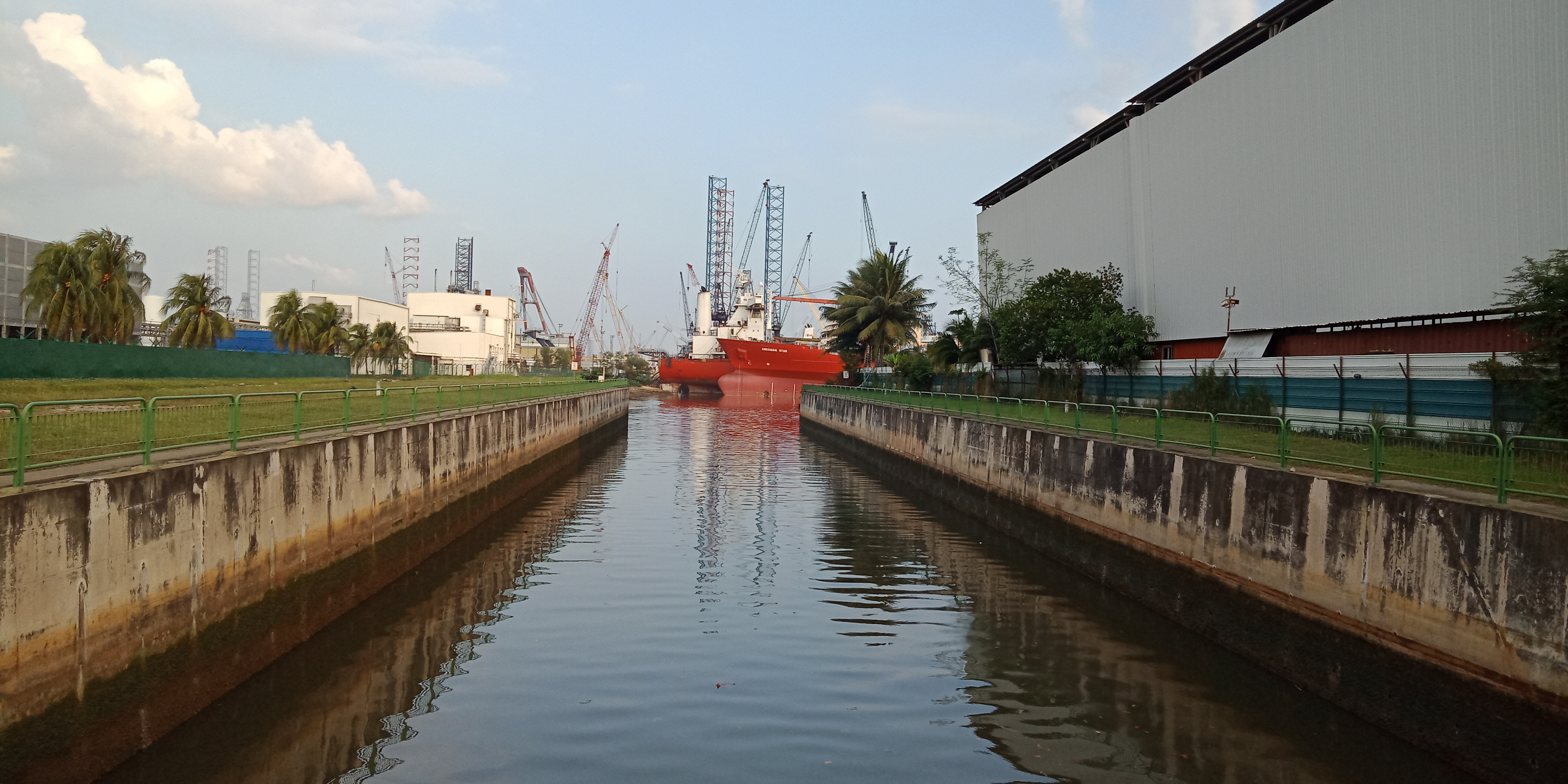
- From top to bottom: Johor Straits Lighthouse at Raffles Marina, Malaysia–Singapore Second Link, Tuas Link MRT station, ships near Tuas South Avenue 5

- Location of Tuas in Singapore

- Location of Tuas within Singapore
- Coordinates: 1°19′00″N 103°39′00″E
- Country: Singapore
- Region: West Region
- CDC: South West CDC
- Town councils: West Coast-Jurong West Town Council
- Constituency: West Coast-Jurong West GRC

Government
  - Mayor: South West CDC: Low Yen Ling
  - Members of Parliament: West Coast-Jurong West GRC: Cassandra Lee; Desmond Lee

Area
  - Total: 47.7 km^{2} (18.4 sq mi)
  - Rank: 3rd

Population (2026)
  - Total: 80
  - Rank: 43rd
  - Density: 1.7/km^{2} (4.3/sq mi)
  - Rank: 46th
- Demonym: Official: Tuas resident
- Postal district: 22

Tuas (IPA: /ˈtwɑːs/ TWAHSS) is a planning area located within the West Region of Singapore. It is bounded by the Western Water Catchment to its north, Pioneer to its east and the Straits of Johor to its west. Tuas also shares a maritime boundary with the Western Islands planning area to its east. It has six subzones, Tengeh, Tuas Bay, Tuas North, Tuas Promenade, Tuas View and Tuas View Extension.

== Etymology ==
The name Tuas is derived from a fishing method previously used by coastal Malays. Shade was created/was made by using coconut fronds as a shelter with a net spread underneath the shade in the water. Once fish are drawn in by the shade, the net is pulled up by the Malay fisherman. Levering or hauling up in Malay is menuas. Without the noun-building prefix of me-, the Malay word is tuas.

== History ==
In Franklin and Jackson's 1830 map of Singapore, the Tuas area is marked with three different names Tg Kampong, Tg Rawa and Tg Gull. Tg is the abbreviation for tanjung or tanjong (Malay for cape).

Tuas used to be swampland which was later cleared for squatter settlement. By the mid twentieth century, it became a fishing village. In the 20th century, it was not unusual to see about 200 fishing boats in Tuas every morning.

In the 1970s, the residents in Tuas were resettled to public housing estates. Tuas was then developed for industrial use. In the 1980s, land was reclaimed off Tuas for more industrial development. By 1988, about 6.5 km^{2} of land off Tuas were reclaimed. Land reclamation off Tuas is still ongoing; the land area of Tuas increased from 17.02 km^{2} in 1996 to 30.04 km^{2} presently. Penta-Ocean Construction was the main construction firm involved in the land reclamation. The peninsular formed from the late 1980s to early 1990s is known as Tuas South, while the land currently being reclaimed to the southeast of Tuas Jetty is known as the Tuas View Extension.

On 2 January 1998, the Malaysia–Singapore Second Link that links Singapore to Malaysia was opened to traffic via Tuas on the Singapore side.

== Industry ==
Being far away from the main residential areas and the commercial district of Singapore, Tuas was chosen as a site for industrial development as the adjacent industrial areas in Jurong Industrial Estate were being built. Heavy industries can be found in Tuas, although not as much as on Jurong Island. Two of Singapore's four incinerators are also found in Tuas, namely Tuas Incinerator and Tuas South Incinerator. A world-scale renewable diesel plant, using palm oil as feedstock, which was completed in 2010, is also located in the area. Its capacity makes it the largest plant of its kind (2.6 million tons per annum).

Currently, land is being reclaimed in Tuas to construct the Tuas Megaport. The Tuas mega port began operations in 2021, and will be fully completed by 2040 to house all of PSA International current assets and operations, PSA will give up its city terminals by 2027 and Pasir Panjang Terminal by 2040. Tanjong Pagar terminal had ceased operations in October 2017, marking the beginning of the end of an era of port operation in the area, dating back to the modern founding of Singapore in 1819.

== Residential areas ==
Tuas has a number of residential buildings provided at low cost for the people who work there. Some are located at Benoi Sector, which also has an eating place, whilst the others are located at Pioneer Road.

The low rise flats are normally named from Blocks A to H, and are usually 9 to 11 stories high. They are built to meet basic residential requirements; they provide shelter with an electricity and water supply. Unlike other areas of Singapore, Tuas is mostly an industrial area and there are only a few flats around.

== Notable places ==
- Tuas Lamp Post 1 is the only lamp post in Singapore on which stickers may be pasted. It is located on land reclaimed for the Tuas mega port project.

== Transportation ==
=== Road network ===
Tuas is served by the Ayer Rajah Expressway (AYE) and the Pan Island Expressway (PIE), connecting the area to the rest of the country. The AYE leads to the Tuas Checkpoint, Immigration and Quarantine (CIQ) complex via Tuas Checkpoint Viaduct and Jalan Ahmad Ibrahim, and onwards to the Malaysia–Singapore Second Link.

=== Mass Rapid Transit ===
On 18 June 2017, four MRT stations opened on the East–West Line as part of the Tuas West Extension to serve the area. They are:

- EW30 Gul Circle
- EW31 Tuas Crescent
- EW32 Tuas West Road
- EW33 Tuas Link

An extension of the East–West line to Tuas South is also under planning.
