= Joo Koon MRT station =

Mass Rapid Transit station in Singapore

Joo Koon EW29 裕群 ஜூ கூன்
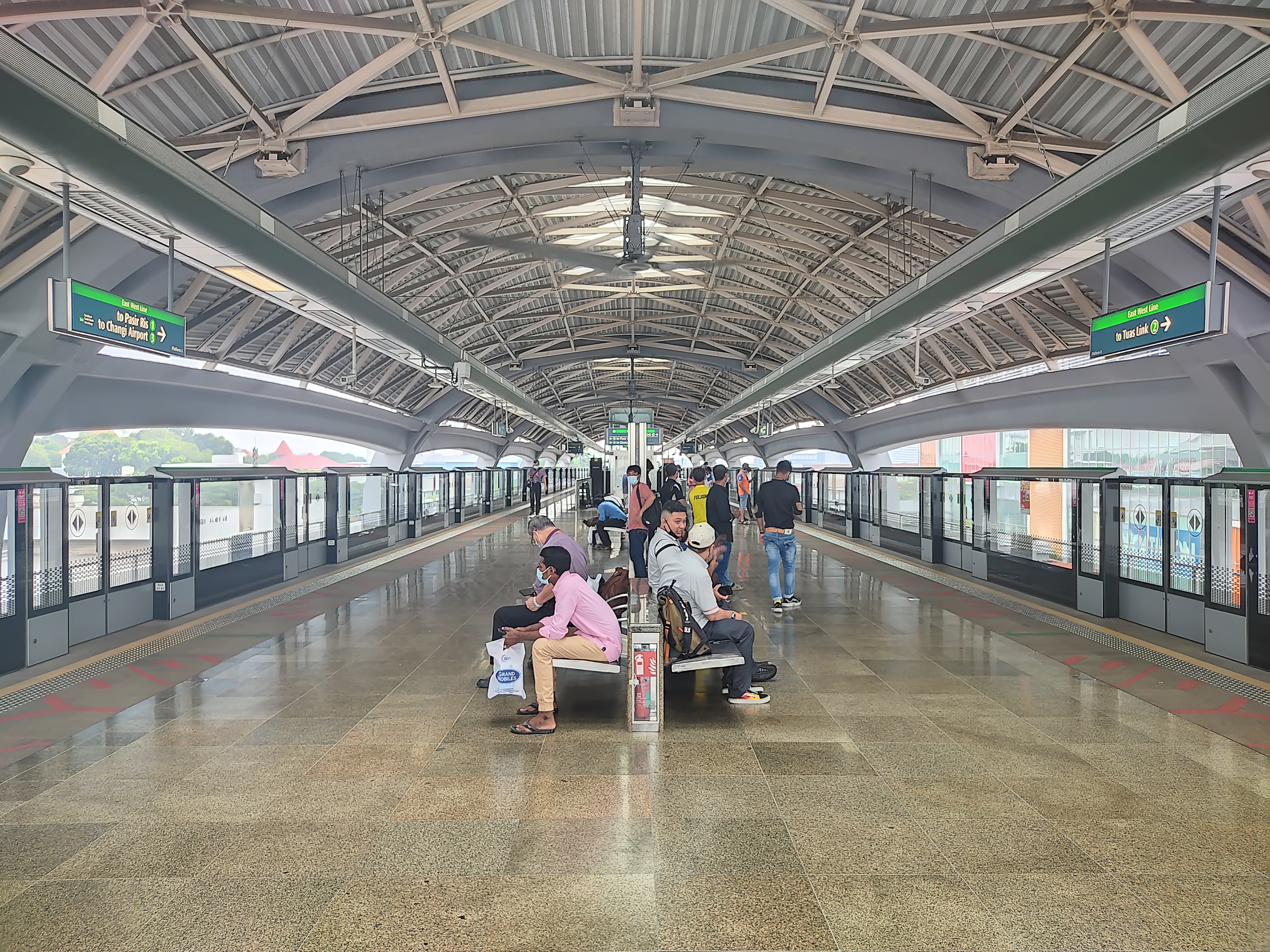
- The island platform of Joo Koon MRT station.

General information
- Location: 91 Joo Koon Circle; Singapore 629116
- Coordinates: 1°19′40″N 103°40′42″E
- System: Mass Rapid Transit (MRT) station
- Operator: SMRT Trains Ltd (SMRT Corporation)
- Line: East–West Line
- Platforms: 2 (1 island platform)
- Tracks: 2
- Connections: Joo Koon Bus Interchange, Taxi

Construction
- Structure type: Elevated
- Platform levels: 1
- Parking: Yes (FairPrice Hub)
- Cycle facilities: Yes
- Accessible: Yes

History
- Opened: 28 February 2009; 17 years ago

Passengers
- June 2024: 14,465 per day

Services
Preceding station	Mass Rapid Transit	Following station
Pioneer towards Pasir Ris	East–West Line	Gul Circle towards Tuas Link
Track layout
Location
- Location within Singapore Rail

Joo Koon MRT station is an above-ground Mass Rapid Transit (MRT) station along the East–West Line in Pioneer planning area, Singapore.

Joo Koon station is named after Joo Koon Village, a rural Chinese settlement that once stood in the area before it was turned into an industrial estate in the 1960s. It was the western terminus of the East–West Line from 28 February 2009 to 18 June 2017, until Tuas Link station was built. Alternate trains terminate at this station during peak hours.

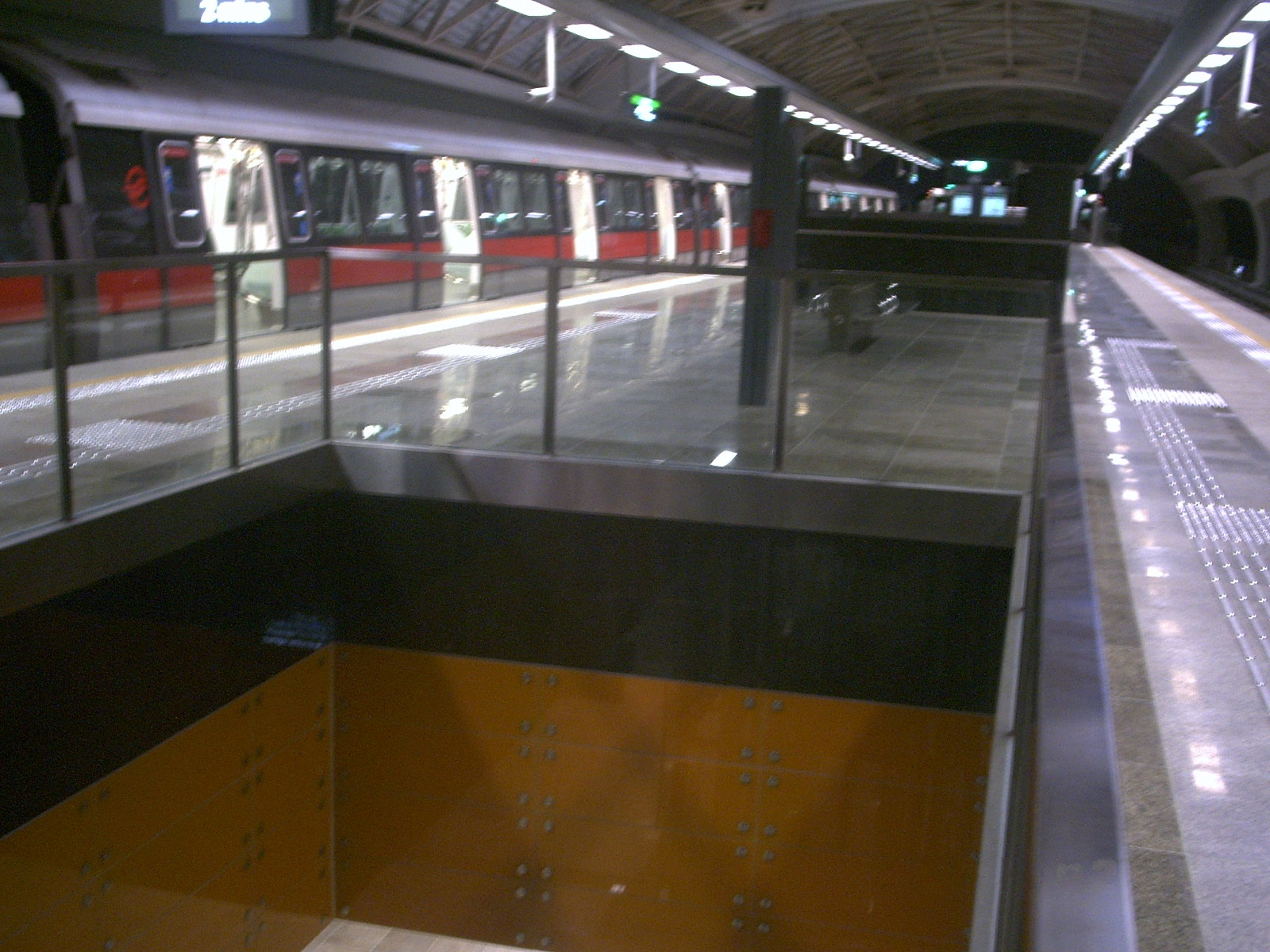
Joo Koon MRT station at night.

== History ==
Joo Koon station was built together with Pioneer station; they were part of the Boon Lay extension (BLE) project announced by the Land Transport Authority in December 2004 to serve the Jurong Industrial Estate.

The station opened on 28 February 2009. Installations of half-height platform screen doors began on 16 May 2011 and began operations in July 2012. The station platform was further retrofitted with high-volume low-speed fans, which began operations on 19 August 2012.

=== Tuas West Extension ===
On 18 June 2017, Tuas Link station superseded Joo Koon as the western terminus of the East–West Line. During the initial opening stage, westbound trains alternated between terminating at both stations.

== Incidents ==
=== 15 November train collision and delay ===
On 15 November 2017 at approximately 8:18 a.m., 2 trains collided at Joo Koon MRT station. A train fault caused the first train heading in the direction of Tuas Link to stall at the station. A minute later, a second train stopped behind the first and then "moved forward unexpectedly", resulting in the collision. 36 passengers and 2 SMRT staff sustained light to moderate injuries, and were conveyed to Ng Teng Fong General Hospital and National University Hospital. This is the second of such incidents after 5 August 1993, with the first being when 2 C151 trains collided at Clementi.

As a result, train services between Tuas Link and Boon Lay stations were temporarily suspended on both directions for 2 hours on the day itself and for the entire day on 16 November, resulting in westbound trains terminating at Boon Lay station.

An update by the Land Transport Authority (LTA) & SMRT on 16 November stated that LTA and SMRT had decided to isolate for up to one month the operations of the Tuas West Extension, which ran on the new signalling system, from the rest of the East–West Line, which ran on the old signalling system, in order to enable LTA and Thales engineers to carry out further assurance checks.

Train service on the Tuas West Extension between Gul Circle and Tuas Link resumed operations on 20 November that year, using the new signalling system. The rest of the East–West Line continued to run on the old signalling system between Pasir Ris and Joo Koon. However, train services between Joo Koon and Gul Circle were suspended until 27 May 2018, though free bridging bus service was available between the two stations. Continuous service to Tuas Link resumed in stages.
