= Gul Circle MRT station =

Mass Rapid Transit station in Singapore

Gul Circle EW30 CR23 卡尔圈 கல் சர்க்கல்
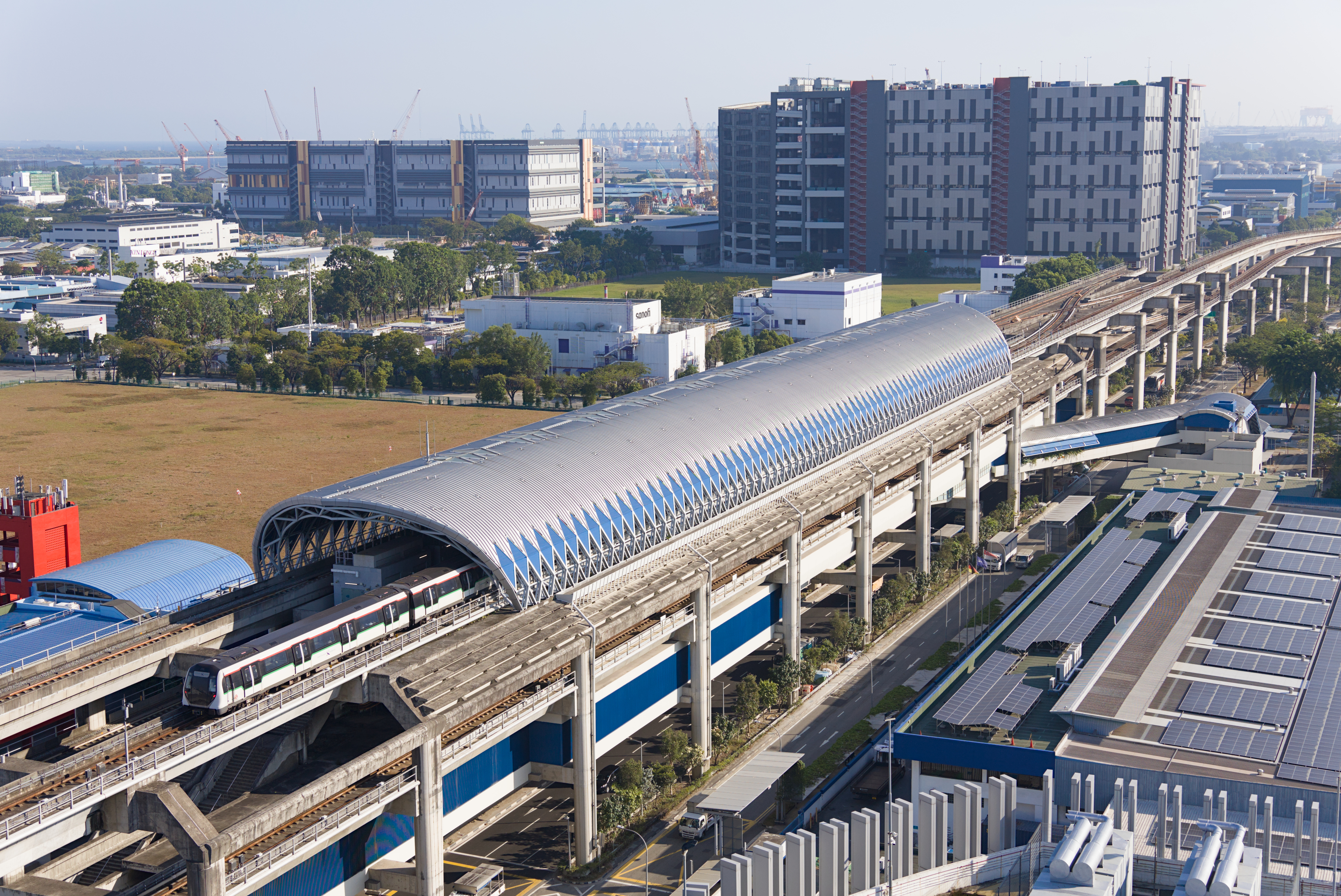
- Exterior of Gul Circle station

General information
- Location: 7A Tuas Road; Singapore 637288
- Coordinates: 1°19′16.32″N 103°39′56.52″E
- Elevation: 33 metres (108 ft)
- System: Mass Rapid Transit (MRT) station
- Operator: SMRT Trains (SMRT Corporation)
- Line: East–West Line
- Platforms: 4 (2 island platforms) (2 not in use)
- Tracks: 4 (2 not in use)
- Connections: Bus, taxi

Construction
- Structure type: Elevated
- Platform levels: 2
- Accessible: Yes

History
- Opened: 18 June 2017; 9 years ago (EWL)
- Opening: late-2030s; 13 years' time (CRL)
- Former names: Tuas

Passengers
- June 2024: 3915 per day

Services
Preceding station	Mass Rapid Transit	Following station
Joo Koon towards Pasir Ris	East–West Line	Tuas Crescent towards Tuas Link
CR22 towards Changi Terminal 5	Cross Island Line Future service	Terminus
Track layout
Location
- Location within Singapore Rail

Gul Circle MRT station (/ɡʌl, ɡuːl/ GULL or GOOL) is an elevated Mass Rapid Transit (MRT) station on the East–West Line (EWL). Located in Tuas, western Singapore, the station serves the surrounding industries of JTC Space @ Tuas and Mapletree Pioneer Logistic Hub. The station is operated by SMRT Trains.

First announced in 2011 as Tuas, it was constructed as part of the Tuas West Extension (TWE). The station began operations on 18 June 2017. At the height of 33 metres (108 ft), the station is the tallest elevated station in Singapore. The station has a stacked island platform arrangement with provisions for an MRT extension to Tuas South, making it the first elevated station in Singapore to have such a configuration. The station is planned to be a future interchange with the Cross Island Line.

== History ==
=== East–West Line ===
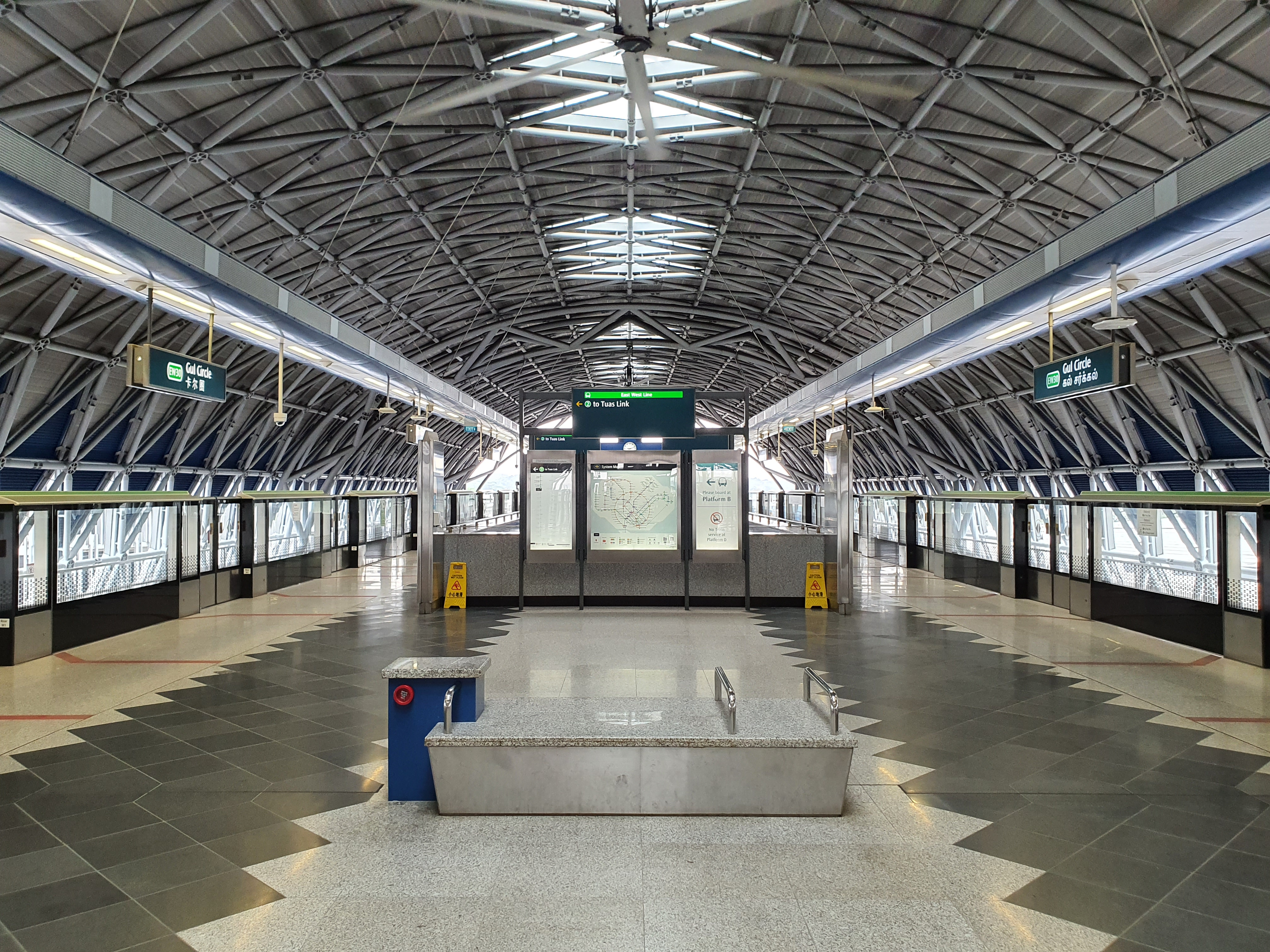
Upper platforms of Gul Circle station

An extension to Tuas from Joo Koon station was first announced in January 2008 by transport minister Raymond Lim to improve public transport access to Tuas and the Jurong Industrial Estate. The station was eventually announced as Tuas station on 11 January 2011, to be constructed as part of the 7.5-kilometre (4.7 mi) Tuas West Extension (TWE) of the East–West Line (EWL). The extension consisted of four stations from Tuas Link to this station.

Contract 1668 for the design and construction of Tuas station was awarded to Shanghai Tunnel Engineering Co Ltd in November 2011. The S$190 million (US$151.1 million) contract included the construction of 3.05 kilometres (1.90 mi) of elevated MRT viaducts. Construction started at the end of 2011, with a scheduled completion date of 2016. The station was renamed to Gul Circle through a public poll on 13 April 2012.

Initially expected to open in 2016, the TWE completion date was pushed to the second quarter of 2017 to allow more time for the testing of the new signalling system implemented for the extension. As announced by the Land Transport Authority (LTA) on 27 April 2017, the station began operations on 18 June that year. Prior to the station's opening, passengers were offered a preview of the station at an open house on 16 June.

=== Cross Island Line ===
On 31 July 2026, transport minister Jeffrey Siow announced that this station will interchange with the Cross Island Line (CRL), as part of Phase 3 of the line. The CRL station is expected to be completed by the late 2030s.

== Details ==
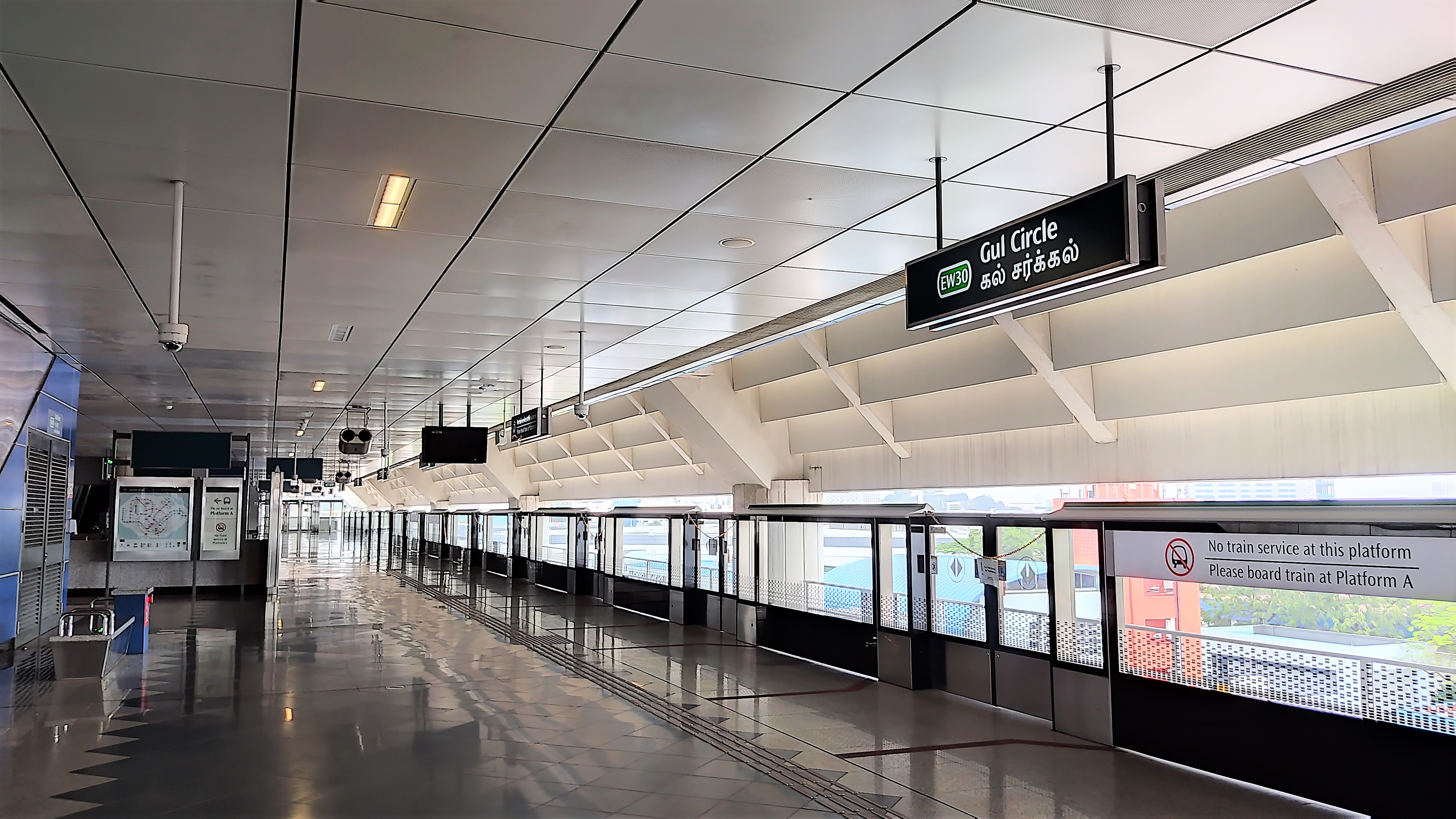
Platform C, which is unused

Gul Circle station serves the EWL and is between the Joo Koon and Tuas Crescent stations. The official station code is EW30. Being part of the EWL, the station is operated by SMRT Trains. The station operates between 5:26 am and 12:41 am. Train frequencies range from 4 to 5 minutes on peak hours and 8 to 9 minutes on non-peak hours.

The three-storey station has a stacked island platform arrangement, with additional side platforms and track provisions for a planned Tuas South extension of the EWL. As of September 2024, however, there were no plans for the extension due to the lack of developments in Tuas South at the time. In July 2026, the LTA said the extension has been shelved due to rising construction costs, and is instead exploring the feasibility of a Bus Rapid Transit (BRT) as a flexible alternative for Tuas. The unused side platforms and track provisions at the station are being retained in case there is a need to meet demand in the future. As the tracks go over the Tuas Flyover of the Ayer Rajah Expressway before the station and travel above and along the Tuas Viaduct after, the station has a height of 33 metres (108 ft), making Gul Circle the tallest elevated station in Singapore.

Gul Circle station is located in Tuas along Tuas Road near the junction with Gul Circle and Tuas Avenue 3. Surrounding landmarks of the station include Tuas Fire Station, JTC Space @ Tuas, Mapletree Pioneer Logistic Hub and Raffles Golf Course. More amenities and retail developments around the station are being planned, with the station planned to be an interchange with the Cross Island Line.
