= Tuas Link MRT station =

Mass Rapid Transit station in Singapore

Tuas Link EW33 大士连路 துவாஸ் லிங்க்
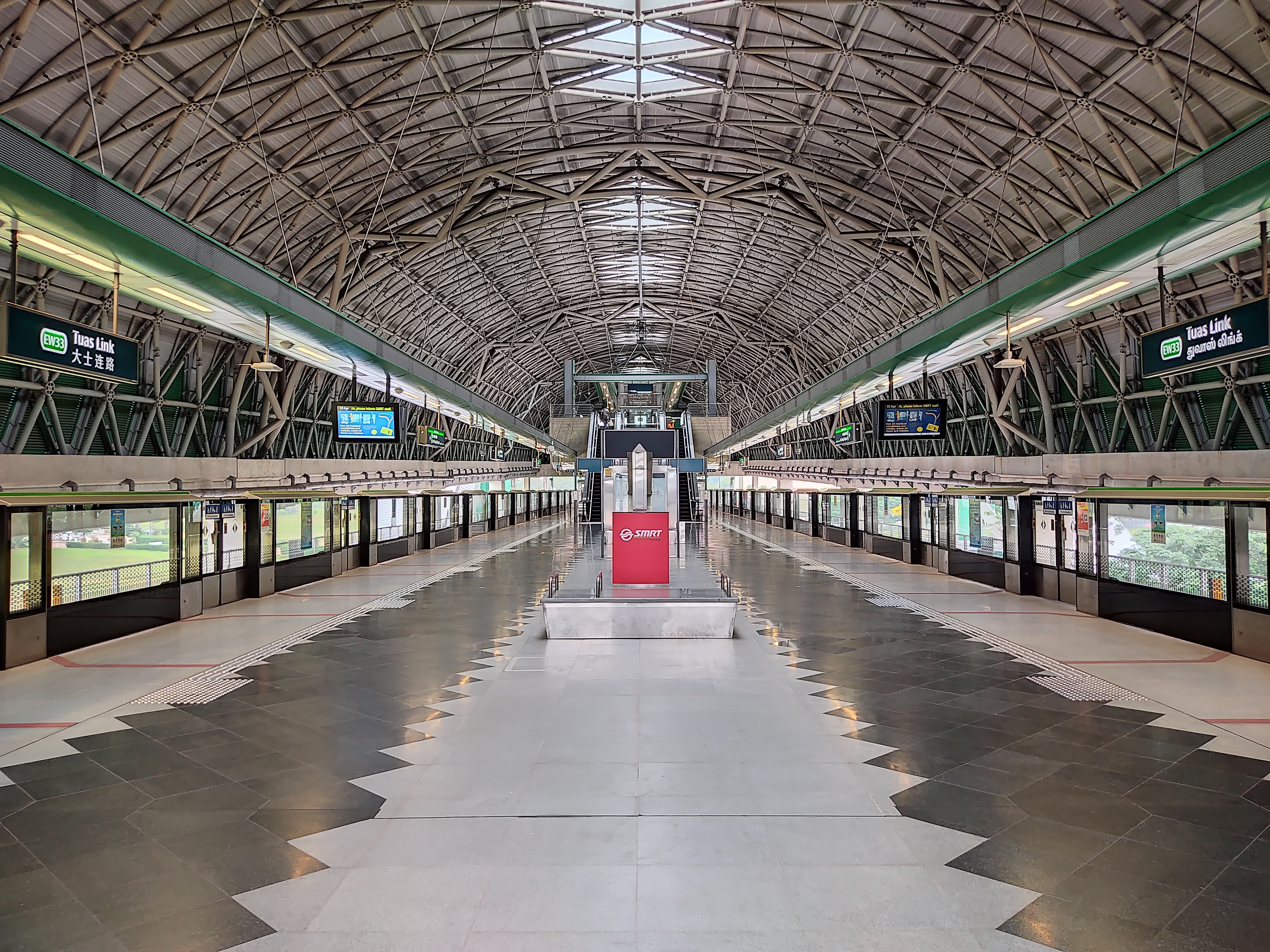
- Platform level of Tuas Link station

General information
- Location: 20 Tuas West Drive; Singapore 638418
- Coordinates: 1°20′25″N 103°38′12.5″E
- System: Mass Rapid Transit (MRT) terminus
- Operator: SMRT Trains (SMRT Corporation)
- Line: East–West Line
- Platforms: 2 (1 island platform)
- Tracks: 2
- Connections: Bus (Tuas Bus Terminal); Causeway Link; Taxi

Construction
- Structure type: Elevated
- Platform levels: 1
- Accessible: Yes

History
- Opened: 18 June 2017; 9 years ago

Passengers
- June 2024: 4,981 per day

Services
Preceding station	Mass Rapid Transit	Following station
Tuas West Road towards Pasir Ris	East–West Line	Terminus
Track layout
Location
- Location within Singapore Rail

Tuas Link MRT station is an elevated Mass Rapid Transit (MRT) station in western Singapore. Located in Tuas along Tuas West Drive, it is located close to Tuas Depot and Tuas Checkpoint. The station is the terminus of the East–West Line (EWL) and the westernmost station in Singapore.

First announced in 2011 as part of the Tuas West Extension (TWE), the station began operations on 18 June 2017. The station is operated by SMRT Trains. It is the only elevated station in Singapore to feature a concourse above the platforms, due to space constraints at the ground level.

== History ==
An extension to Tuas from Joo Koon station was first announced in January 2008 by transport minister Raymond Lim to improve public transport access to Tuas and the Jurong Industrial Estate. The station, first announced on 11 January 2011, would be constructed as part of the 7.5-kilometre (4.7 mi) Tuas West Extension (TWE) of the East–West line (EWL). The extension consisted of four stations between this station and Tuas station (now renamed Gul Circle).

The contract for the construction of this station and the adjacent Tuas West Road station was awarded to China Railway 11 Bureau Group Corporation (Singapore Branch) in November 2011. The S$150 million (US$119.26 million) contract included the construction of 2.2 kilometres (1.4 miles) of elevated MRT viaducts. Construction of the TWE began with a groundbreaking ceremony held at the station's construction site on 4 May 2012.

On 25 August, a construction worker died when he fell into a bore hole at the station's work site. The Singapore Civil Defence Force recovered the body 24 hours after the incident. The incident happened when the rebar cage the workers were lowering dislodged and led to the worker falling into the hole.

Initially expected to open in 2016, the TWE completion date was pushed to the second quarter of 2017 to allow more time for the testing of the new signalling system implemented for the extension. As announced by the Land Transport Authority (LTA) on 27 April 2017, the station began operations on 18 June that year. Prior to the station's opening, passengers were offered a preview of the station at an open house on 16 June, with an opening ceremony held at this station hosted by second transport minister Ng Chee Meng.

Construction progress of the station

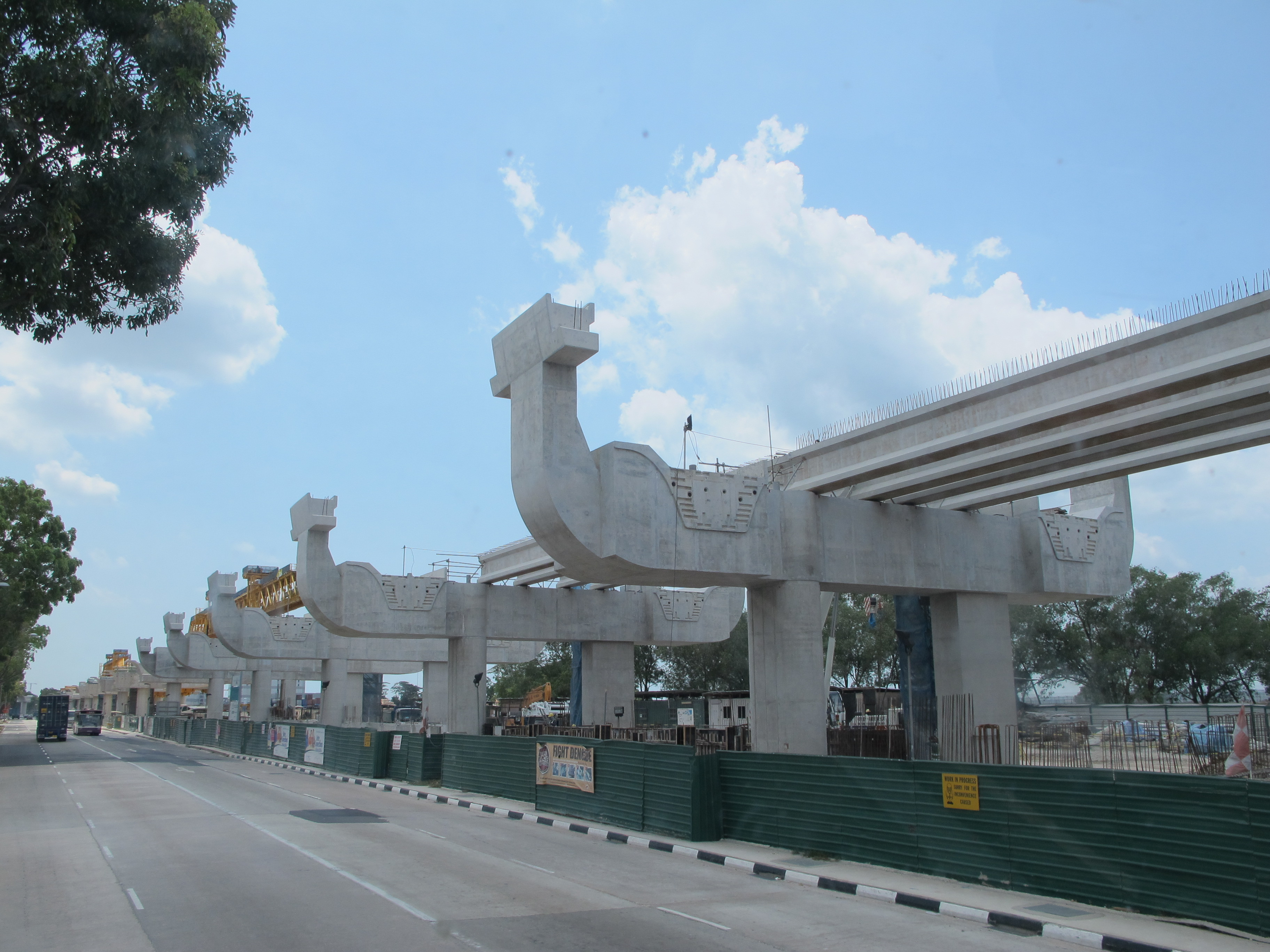
Station in February 2014, with pillars and the bare station structure

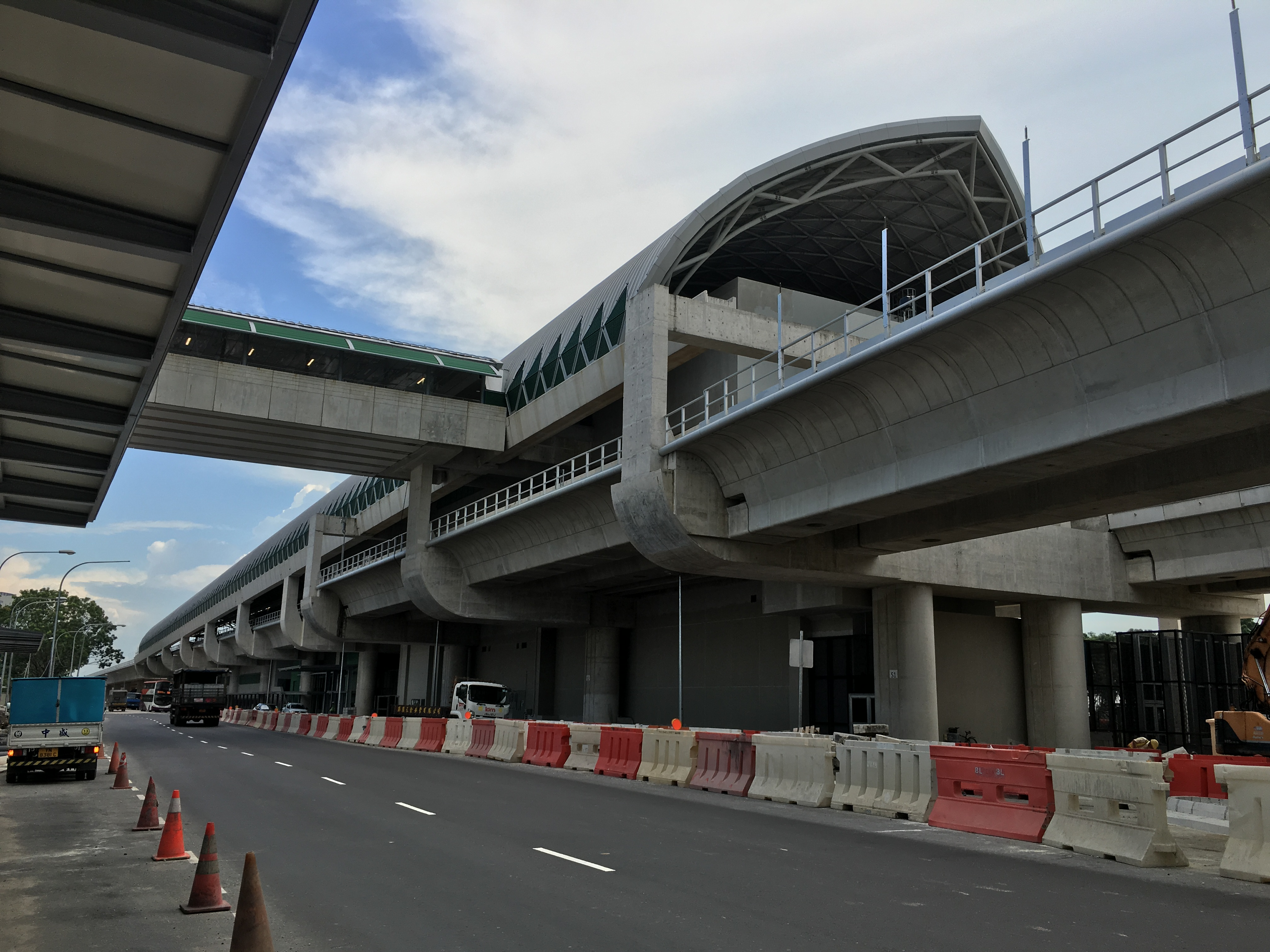
Exterior of the station in June 2016 nearing completion

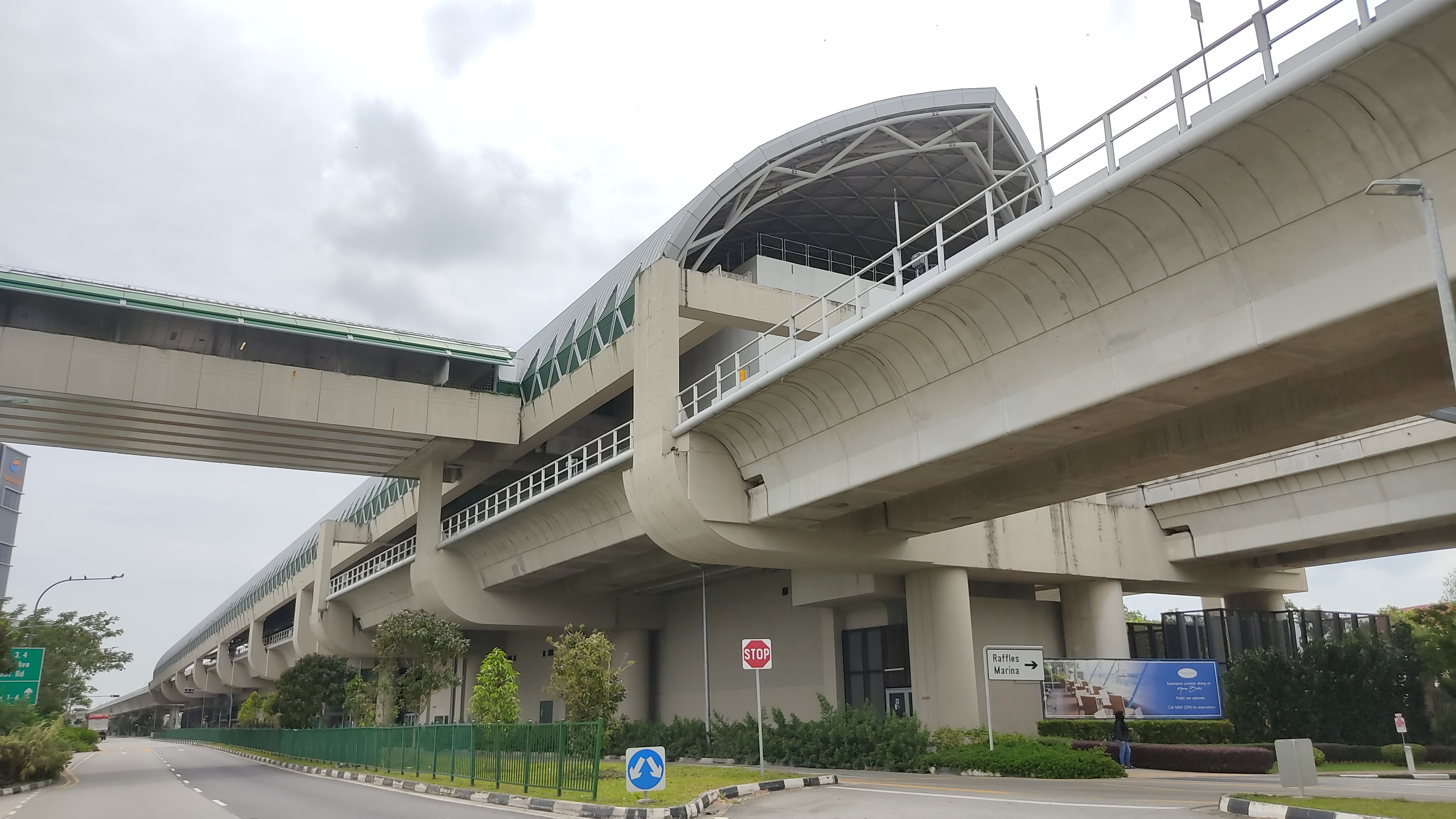
Existing station exterior

== Station details ==
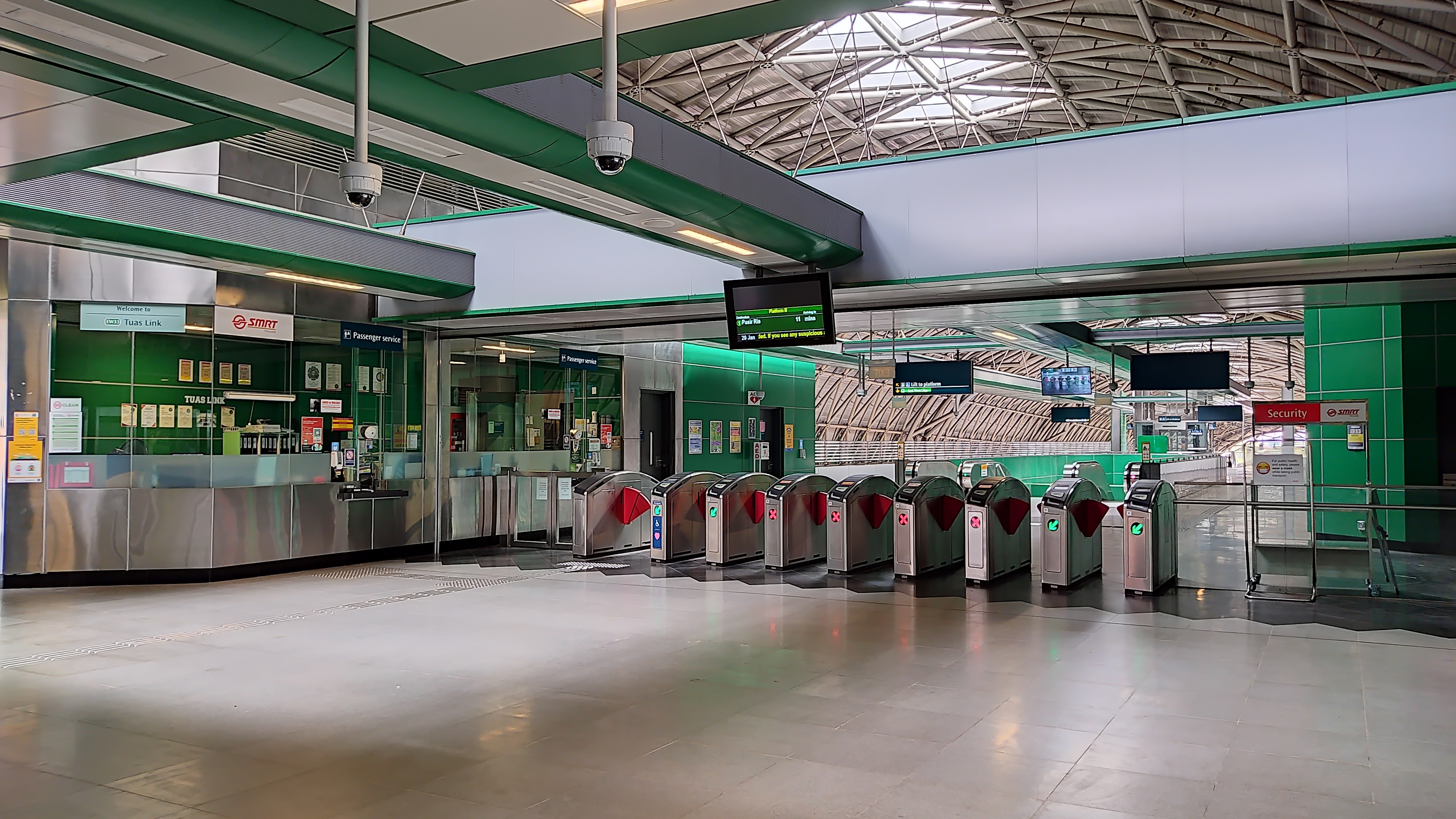
Concourse level of the station

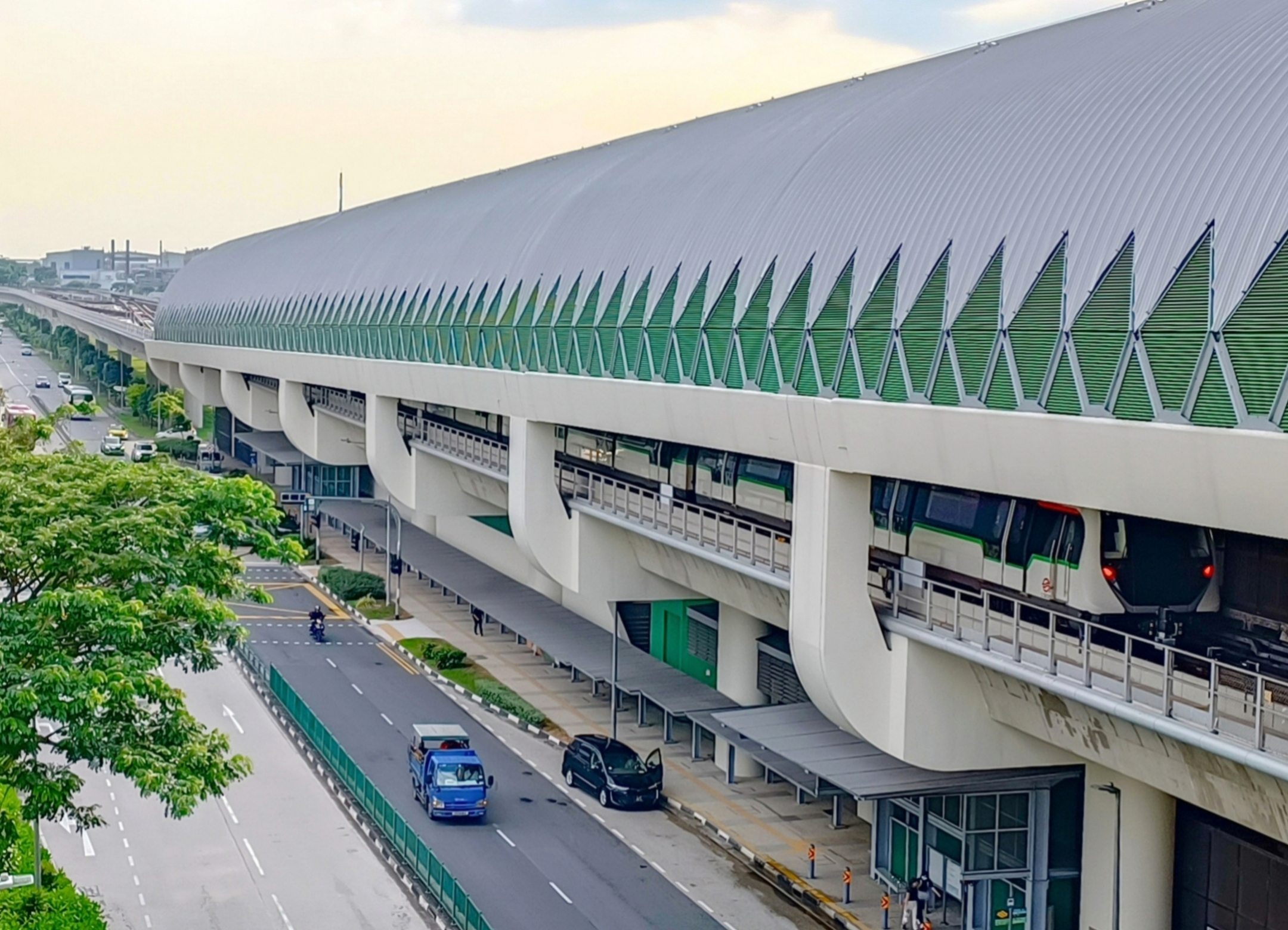
Station exterior with the roof sloping upwards

Tuas Link station is the terminus of the EWL, with the adjacent station eastbound being Tuas West Road. The official station code is EW33. Being part of the EWL, the station is operated by SMRT Trains. The station operates between 4:55 am and 1:00 am. Train frequencies are ranged as follows due to low demand:

Hours	Frequency
Peak hours	4 – 6 minutes (Alternate trains terminate at Joo Koon)
Transition hours (9am – 11.30am and 8pm – 12am)	2 – 3 minutes (Only applicable for westbound)
Off-peak hours	15 minutes (1 out of 3 trains terminate at Tuas Link, all others terminate at Joo Koon)

Westbound trains on the EWL alternate between terminating at this station or Joo Koon station. The station is located along Tuas West Drive and has two entrances. The station serves developments such as Tuas Depot, Tuas Bus Terminal, Raffles Marina and Tuas Checkpoint. The station also serves cross-border bus services to Johor Bahru.

To the north, the tracks extend further by 300 metres (980 ft) as a provision for further extensions. Tuas Link is the first elevated station to have the concourse located above the platforms at one end of the station. The concourse has an open view of the platforms. This was due to the limited space at the ground level, with the station site bounded by Raffles Marina and land reserved for road expansion. The tracks also have to be at a lower level to allow a safe descent for trains travelling between the station and the nearby Tuas Depot. The 2,300-square-metre (0.57-acre) concourse at 16 metres (52 ft) above ground is the smallest concourse among the elevated stations.
