= BGB =

BGB may refer to:

- Bürgerliches Gesetzbuch, the civil code of Germany
- Border Guard Bangladesh, a paramilitary force responsible for Bangladesh's border security
- Bauern-, Gewerbe- und Bürgerpartei, a former political party in Switzerland (1917–1971)
- Barberton Greenstone Belt, a geological feature located in South Africa.
- Bukit Gombak MRT station (MRT station abbreviation BGB), a Mass Rapid Transit station in Bukit Batok, Singapore
