= Kawasaki Heavy Industries & Nippon Sharyo C751B =

Class of electric multiple units in Singapore

Kawasaki Heavy Industries & Nippon Sharyo (KNS) C751B
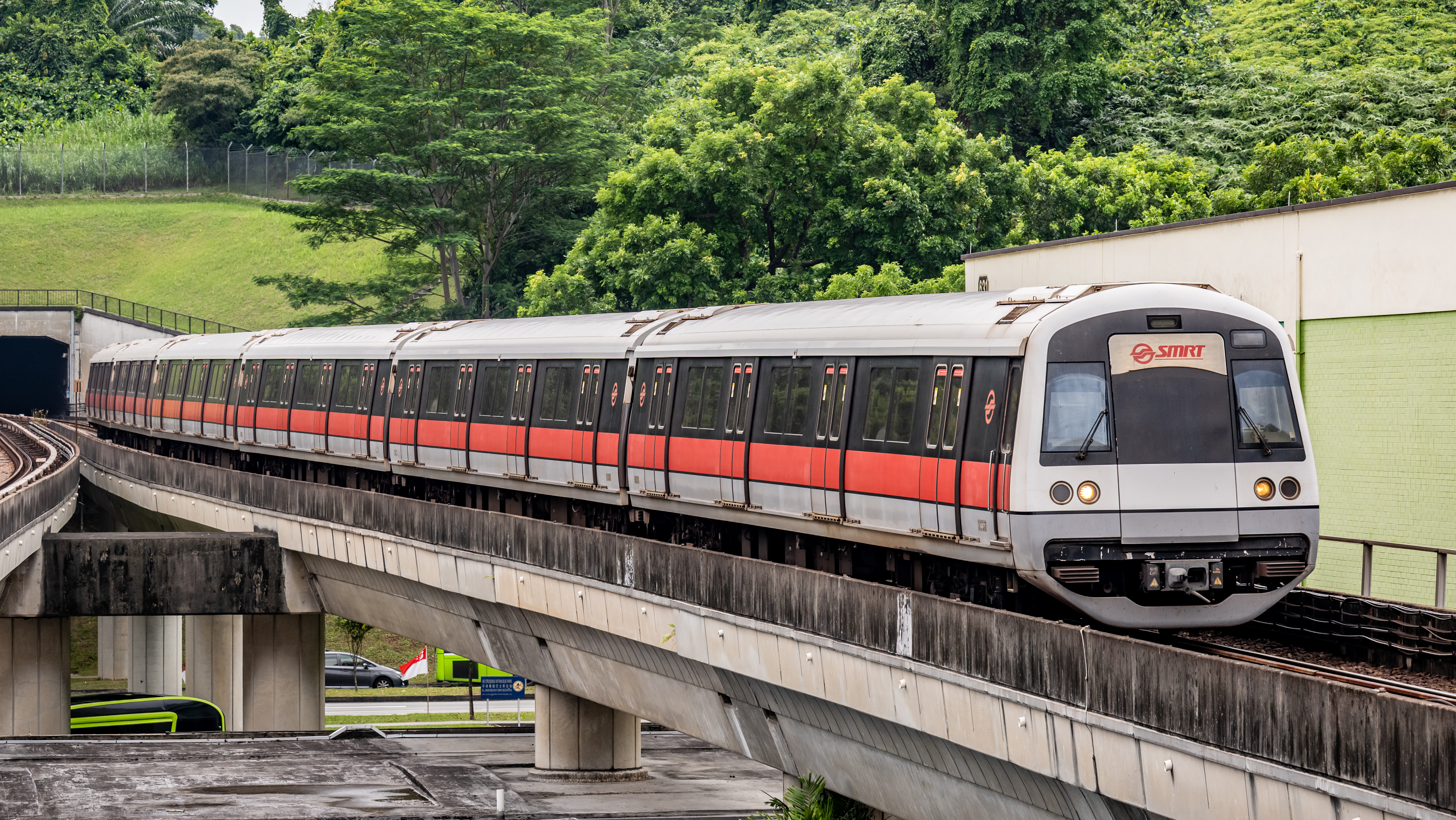
- A C751B trainset at Bukit Batok station.

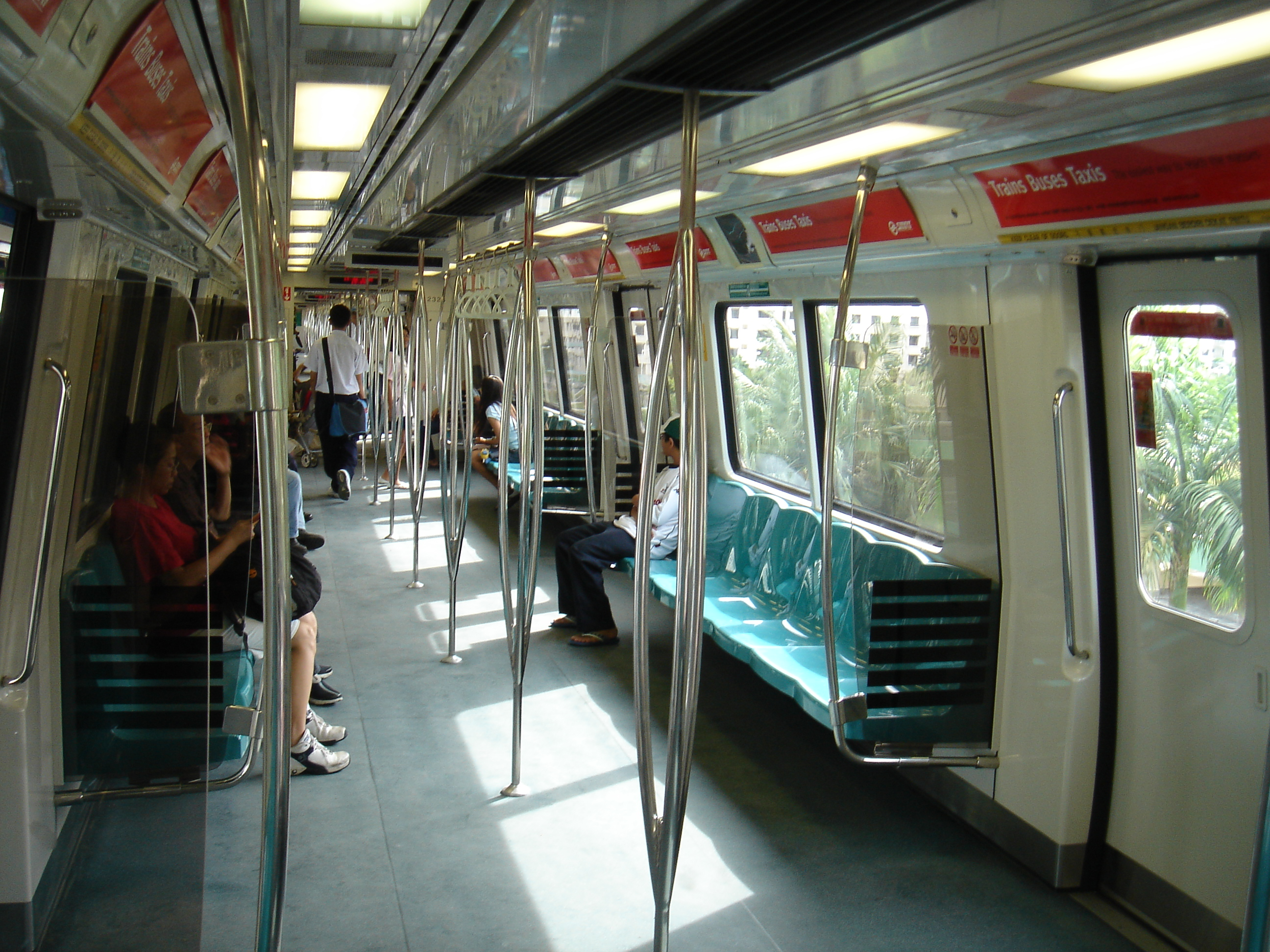
- Interior of a C751B motor compartment.
- Stock type: Electric multiple unit
- In service: 28 January 2000 – 30 September 2024 (24 years, 246 days)
- Manufacturers: Kawasaki, Nippon Sharyo
- Designer: GK Industrial Design
- Built at: Kawasaki: Kobe, Hyogo, Japan; Nippon Sharyo: Toyokawa, Aichi, Japan
- Constructed: 1999 – 2001
- Entered service: 28 January 2000; 26 years ago
- Retired: 7 December 2024; 22 months ago
- Scrapped: March 2021 – December 2024
- Number built: 126 vehicles (21 sets)
- Number preserved: 12 vehicles
- Number scrapped: 114 vehicles
- Successor: Alstom Movia R151
- Formation: 6 per trainset DT–M1–M2+M2–M1–DT
- Fleet numbers: 311/312 – 351/352
- Capacity: 1920 passengers (276/288 seats)
- Operator: SMRT Trains (SMRT Corporation)
- Depots: Bishan; Ulu Pandan; Tuas; Changi
- Lines served: North–South Line; East–West Line

Specifications
- Car body construction: Aluminium-alloy double-skinned construction
- Train length: 138.86 m (455 ft 6 7/8 in)
- Car length: 23.83 m (78 ft 2 in) (DT); 22.8 m (74 ft 10 in) (M)
- Width: 3.2 m (10 ft 6 in)
- Height: 3.7 m (12 ft 1 5/8 in)
- Doors: 1,450 mm (57 1/8 in), 8 per car, 4 per side
- Maximum speed: 90 km/h (56 mph) (design); 80 km/h (50 mph) (service)
- Weight: 222.8 t (219.3 long tons; 245.6 short tons) (unladen); 320.3 t (315.2 long tons; 353.1 short tons) (laden)
- Traction system: Fuji Electric IGBT–VVVF (output 415 kVA)
- Traction motors: 16 × Fuji Electric MLR109 140 kW (188 hp) self-ventilated 3-phase AC induction motor 550V 193A 1760 r/min
- Power output: 2.24 MW (3,004 hp)
- Transmission: Westinghouse-Natal (WN) Drive
- Acceleration: 1 m/s^{2} (3.3 ft/s^{2})
- Deceleration: 1.3 m/s^{2} (4.3 ft/s^{2}) (service)
- Auxiliaries: Fuji Electric auxiliary inverter with battery charger 80 kVA + 16 kW
- Electric systems: 750 V DC third rail
- Current collection: Collector shoe
- UIC classification: 2′2′+Bo′Bo′+Bo′Bo′+Bo′Bo′+Bo′Bo′+2′2′
- Bogies: bolsterless air-spring monolink axlebox type
- Braking systems: Regenerative and electro-pneumatic
- Safety systems: Original: Westinghouse Brake and Signal Company FS2000 ATP fixed block ATC under ATO GoA 2 (STO), with subsystems of ATP and ATS; Current: Thales SelTrac® moving block CBTC ATC under ATO GoA 3 (DTO), with subsystems of ATP, NetTrac ATS and CBI
- Coupling system: Scharfenberg coupler
- Track gauge: 1,435 mm (4 ft 8 1/2 in) standard gauge

The Kawasaki Heavy Industries & Nippon Sharyo (KNS) C751B is a class of retired trains that were the third generation of electric multiple unit rolling stock that operated on the North–South and East–West lines of Singapore's Mass Rapid Transit (MRT) system from January 2000 to September 2024, manufactured by Kawasaki Heavy Industries & Nippon Sharyo (KNS) under Contract 751B. 21 trainsets of 6 cars each were purchased at S$231 million, and it was the first rolling stock to feature VVVF insulated-gate bipolar transistor traction control system. Kawasaki manufactured 66 cars and Nippon Sharyo manufactured 60 cars respectively with no comparable differences, having been built to agreed specifications.

== Exterior design ==
The front of the train spotted a more slanted and streamlined look, with the run number display in Orange LED Displays. The C751B train was the first Singapore's MRT train to be painted in SMRT's "Blackbird" livery.

The C751B was also the first MRT train type to feature anti-climbers, which help prevent overriding of the train cab in the event of a collision that could cause a catastrophic failure. They also featured rubber guards to prevent people from falling between cars: this feature was also used on the C151A. However, the rubber guards are now redundant with the introduction of half height platform screen doors (HHPSDs) on elevated stations. The C151A, C151B and C151C sets manufactured by Kawasaki Heavy Industries & CRRC Qingdao Sifang are also developed from the Kawasaki–Nippon Sharyo C751B.

== Interior design ==
All cars were retrofitted with 6 LCD Displays per car and all except trainset 347/348 which featured Visual Passenger Information System (VPIS) displays from July 2001 to September 2009. These used to show rail travel information, commercials and movie trailers. The C751B was also the first train to have wheelchair spaces, with the retrofitting of the elevators in the MRT stations, which also began in 2000. The interior design was also improved; the seats were now 48 cm wide - about 5 cm wider than on previous train types. STARiS (SMRT Active Route Map Information System) 2.0 was piloted on train car 3322 in 2010, but it was uninstalled in 2016 as it was not compatible with the updated STARiS displays.

The LCD Displays were deactivated since July 2007 and LED Displays was not used since January 2008 with the change of voice announcer. By 2010, all VPIS displays had been removed in favour of STARiS. In 2013, support bars were added to the seats with hand grips, and the middle handrails with hand grips were configured to join across nearly one car; as such, all triplicated stanchion poles were replaced by regular single grabpoles.

The colour of the seats on each car of these trains was also different from those of the train's predecessors - greyish blue for M1, turquoise for M2 and magenta for DT. A dark teal flooring was also installed, and all door panels and walls were white coloured, which is a standard appearance of all SMRT trains. Energy efficient lighting was installed on cars 1328 and 3328 in 2017.

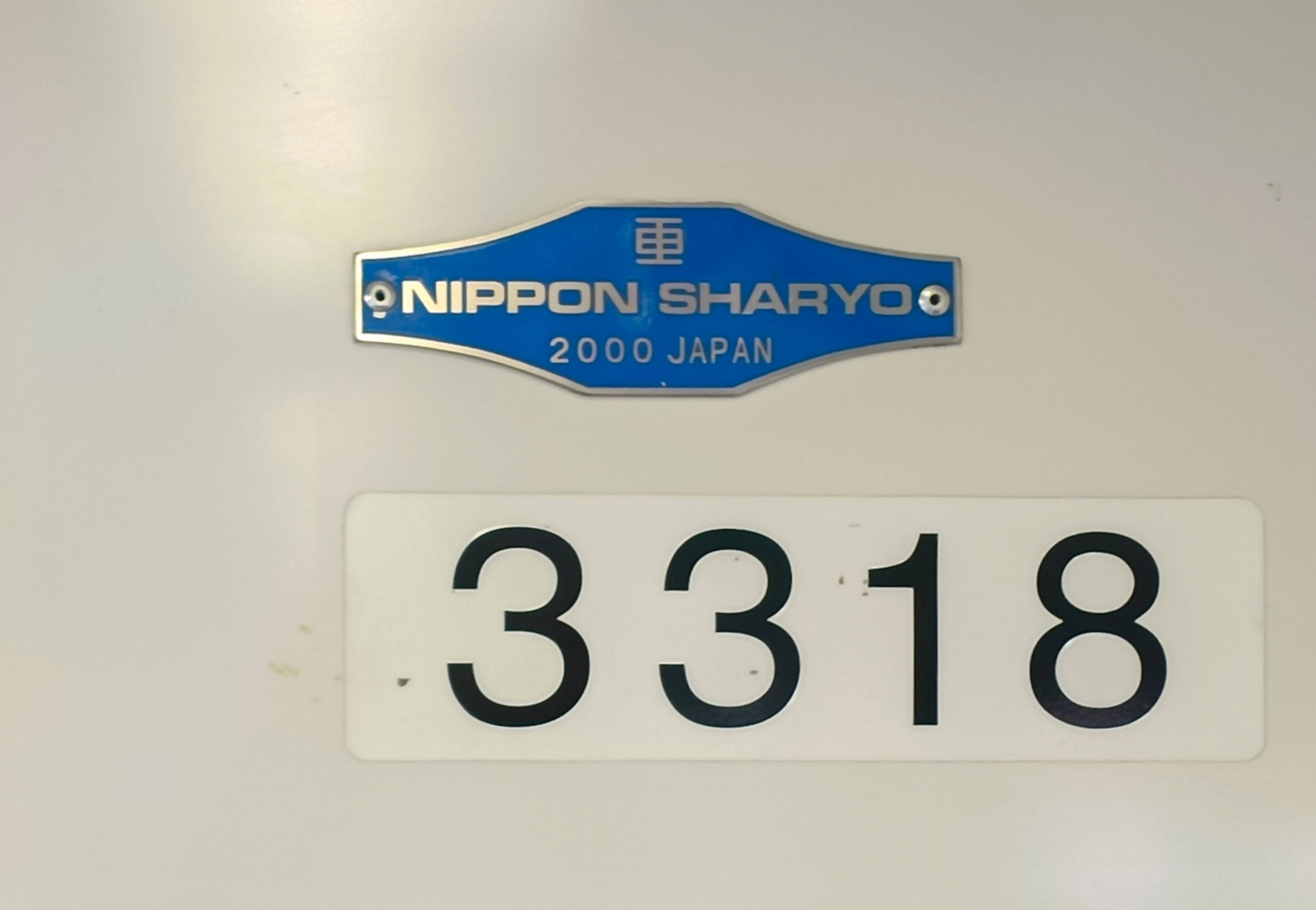
Builder's plate of a Nippon Sharyo-built C751B train

== Equipment ==
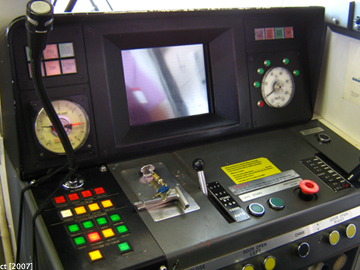
The C751B was also the first EMU in Singapore to be fitted with the Train Information Management System (TIMS) also used onboard Japanese trains

=== Main propulsion controller/motor ===
The C751B was the second commuter type Electric Multiple Unit (EMU) after the Sanyo 5030 series to feature electric systems fully manufactured by Fuji Electric. Propulsion was controlled by VVVF Inverter with 2-level IGBT semiconductor controller, rated at 415 kVA. Each inverter unit controlled two motors on one bogie (1C2M), and one motor car featured two of such units. Motors were three-phrase AC induction type, model MLR109, with a maximum output of 140 kW.

=== Bogies ===
The C751B used the monolink axlebox type bolsterless air spring bogie. There are no major technical difference between a trailer and motor car bogie other than additional electrical components for the latter.

=== Auxiliary systems ===
A break from tradition, the C751B featured auxiliary inverters for its electrical systems on all six cars of the train. Previously, auxiliary inverters are mounted only on motor cars. The VVVF Inverter was controlled by IGBT semiconductors and rated at 80 kVA. A battery charger was built with the inverter and provides 16 kW output.

== Derivatives ==
The Kawasaki Heavy Industries & Nippon Sharyo C751B formed the basis for the next three rolling stock generations for the North–South and East–West lines, consisting of the C151A, C151B and C151C sets manufactured by the Kawasaki Heavy Industries & CRRC Qingdao Sifang consortium (KSF).

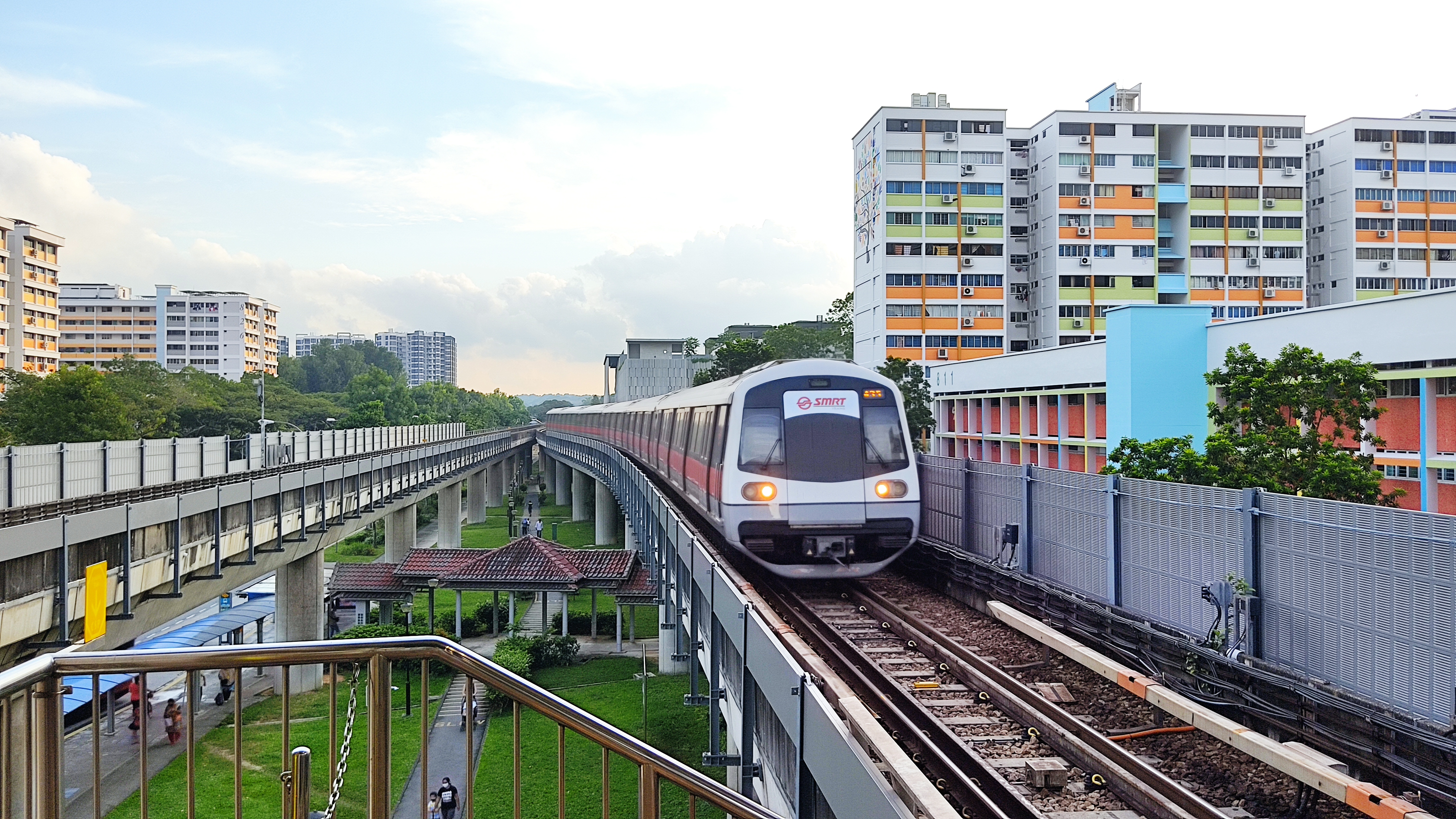
A KSF C151A approaching Khatib MRT station in 2020.

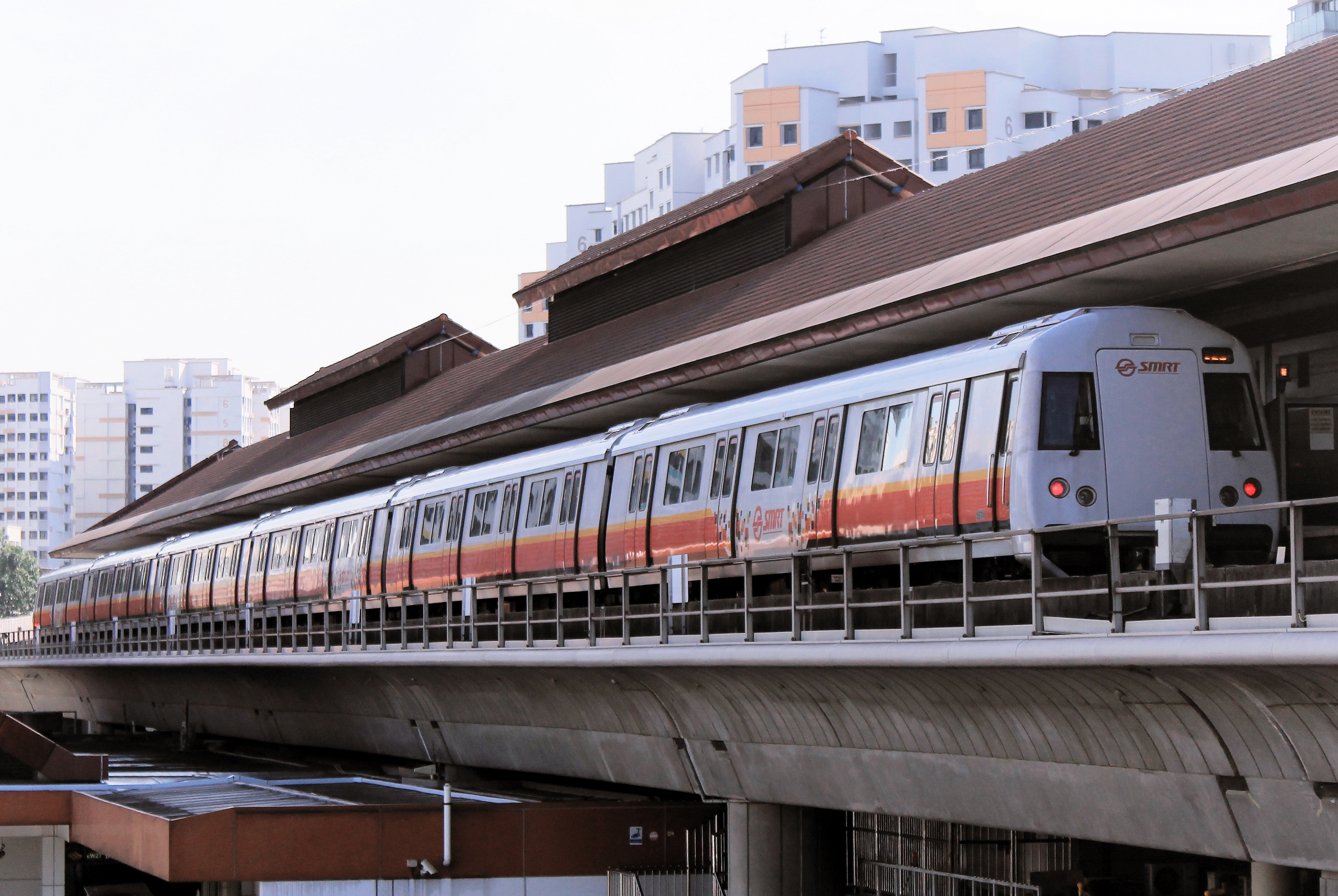
A KSF C151B at Boon Lay MRT station in 2022.

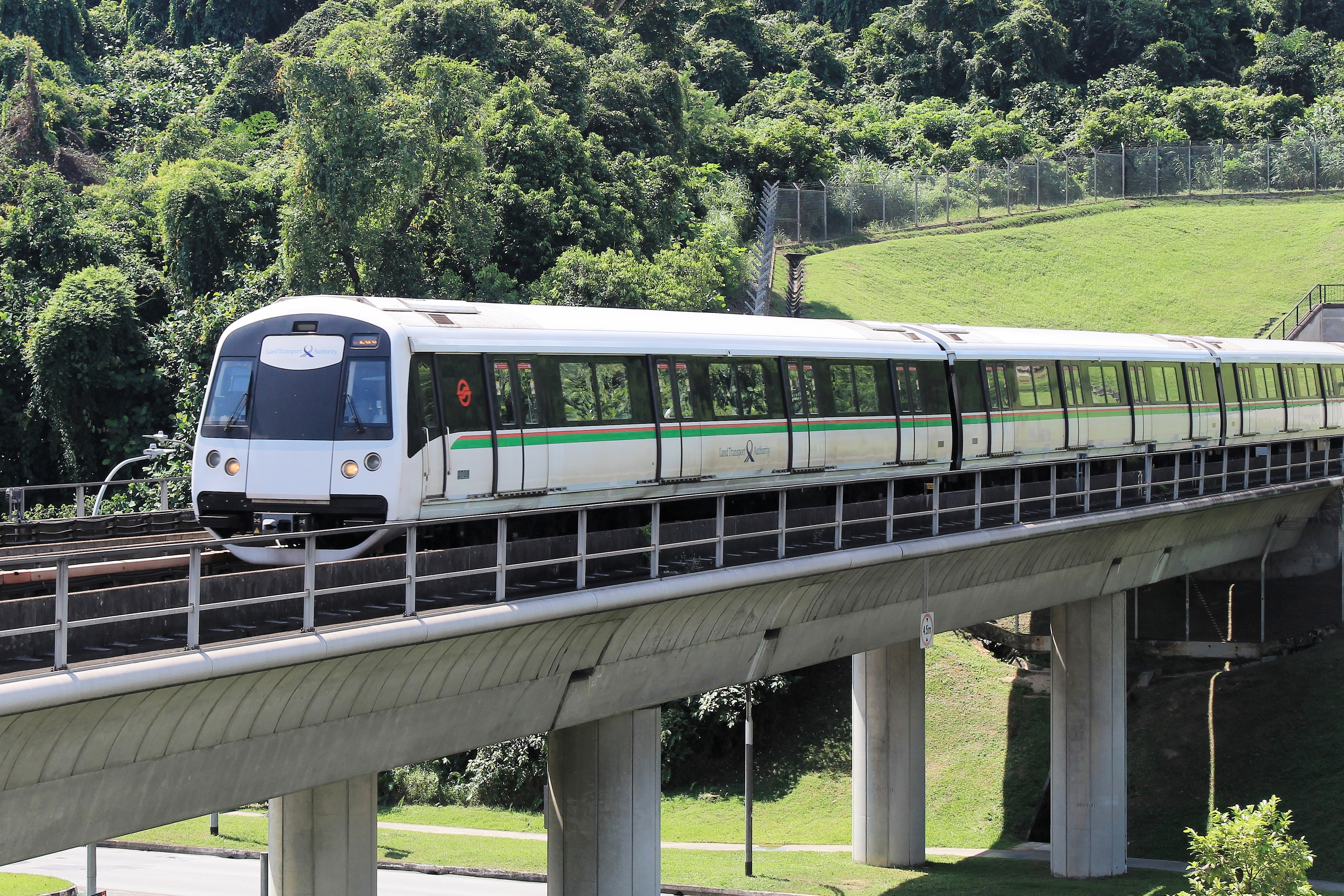
A KSF C151C approaching Bukit Batok MRT station in 2022.

== Operational history ==
The tender of the C751B trains was called on 12 April 1997 together with the opening of Changi Airport extension and to continuously expand the fleet. The contract was awarded to Japanese firms Kawasaki and Nippon Sharyo on 18 January 1998. The first C751B was delivered in August 1999 to Singapore, before entering revenue service on 28 January 2000. The formal launch ceremony was held on 8 May 2000 at Ang Mo Kio MRT station.

It was the first train to be painted in the Blackbird SMRT livery since 1998, which was used for new and refurbished trains until 2016. These trains were capable of running on both the North–South and East–West Lines at all times. However, they were mostly deployed from 2012 on the North–South Line until 2018 when most trains were moved to East–West Line.

With the opening of the Changi Airport Line, several trains were delivered with luggage racks and were installed in every carriage of the train, taking up the space of two seats next to the door at the end of each carriage. Passengers preferred not to use them in fear of theft and were underutilised as people preferred to hold on to their bags in the train. Luggage racks were eventually removed when the through train service to Changi Airport was converted into a shuttle service, and the luggage rack spaces were replaced by extra standing spaces.

On 13 April 2002, a fault was detected in a C751B train and it was subsequently withdrawn to Changi Depot for investigations. As the train was under warranty, the engineers from the manufacturers of the train and gearbox were flown in on 21 April. They subsequently detected metal fragments in the gearboxes, and those of another 20 trains. On 23 April 2002, SMRT immediately withdrew all 21 C751B trains and suspended the Boon Lay – Changi Airport train through service, replacing it with the Tanah Merah – Changi Airport shuttle service. Train frequencies were also adjusted until 6 May 2002, when 8 trains returned to service. Service resumed on 16 May 2002, with 7 more trains back on service. By end of May 2002, all C751B trains had been returned to service.

=== Retirement and preservation ===
All C751B trains, together with the 19 C651 trains were completely decommissioned by the end of 2024, ahead of the decommissioning of the first-generation C151 trains. This was because the C651 and C751B fleets had a relatively low reliability and the fleet was also smaller compared to the C151 fleet.

In December 2019, Toyotron Pte Ltd was awarded the contract for disposal of old SMRT trains. On 28 September 2020, the LTA announced that a second batch of 40 new Alstom Movia R151 trains was ordered to replace all 21 Kawasaki-Nippon Sharyo C751B trainsets along with the 19 Siemens C651 trainsets from 2025 onwards, on top of the initial order of 66 R151 trains to replace the 66 Kawasaki Heavy Industries C151 trainsets. On 13 March 2021, the first C751B train (set 339/340) was sent for scrap.

On 30 September 2024, the last C751B train in revenue service (set 337/338) made its final run on the North–South Line; it was sent to Tuas Depot to await scrapping on 4 October 2024, ending its 24 years of service. The C751B fleet was officially retired on 7 December 2024, with carriages of the last remaining C751B train (set 337/338) scrapped or preserved between 7–11 December 2024.

Notable trains that were preserved include at the Rail Engineering Hub at ITE College West where it is used for educational purposes since March 2023, at the Safti City where two trains were donated to the Singapore Armed Forces for military training in November 2023, at JTC's LaunchPad @ one-north where one train was repurposed to become the TrainPod hotel since June 2024, and outside City Square Mall where one train has been repurposed to become the CDL Eco Train near Farrer Park MRT station since September 2024 as a classroom and gallery to raise awareness about climate topics and sustainability.

== Train formation ==
The configuration of a C751B in revenue service is DT–M1–M2+M2–M1–DT.

Cars of C751B
| Car Type | Driver Cab | Motor | Collector Shoe | Car Length | | Wheelchair Space |
| Car Type | Driver Cab | Motor | Collector Shoe | mm | ft in | Wheelchair Space |
|---|---|---|---|---|---|---|
| DT | ✓ | ✗ | ✓ | 23,830 | 78 ft 2.2 in | ✗ |
| M1 | ✗ | ✓ | ✓ | 22,800 | 74 ft 9.6 in | ✗ |
| M2 | ✗ | ✓ | ✓ | 22,800 | 74 ft 9.6 in | ✓ |

The car numbers of the trains range from x311 to x352, where x depends on the carriage type. Individual cars are assigned a 4 digit serial number by the rail operator SMRT Trains. A complete six-car trainset consists of an identical twin set of one driving trailer (DT) and two motor (M) cars permanently coupled together.

For example, set 351/352 consists of carriages 3351, 1351, 2351, 2352, 1352 and 3352 in this order.

- The first digit identifies the car number, where the trailer cars has a 3, the second and fifth cars has a 1 & the middle cars has a 2.
- The second digit is always a 3, part of the identification numbers
- The third digit and fourth digit are the train identification numbers. A full-length train of 6 cars have 2 different identification numbers. For example, 351/352 (normal coupling) or 335/351 (cross coupling).
  - Kawasaki built sets 311/312, 315/316, 319/320, 323/324, 327/328 – 333/334, 343/344, 347/348 and 351/352.
  - Nippon Sharyo co-built sets 313/314, 317/318, 321/322, 325/326, 335/336 – 341/342, 345/346 and 349/350.

As fleet number 301/302 was already being used by a money train (which was a Kawasaki Heavy Industries C151), the C751B trains were numbered starting from 311/312.
