= Choa Chu Kang MRT/LRT station =

Mass Rapid Transit and light rail station in Singapore

Choa Chu Kang NS4 JS1 BP1 蔡厝港 சுவா சூ காங்
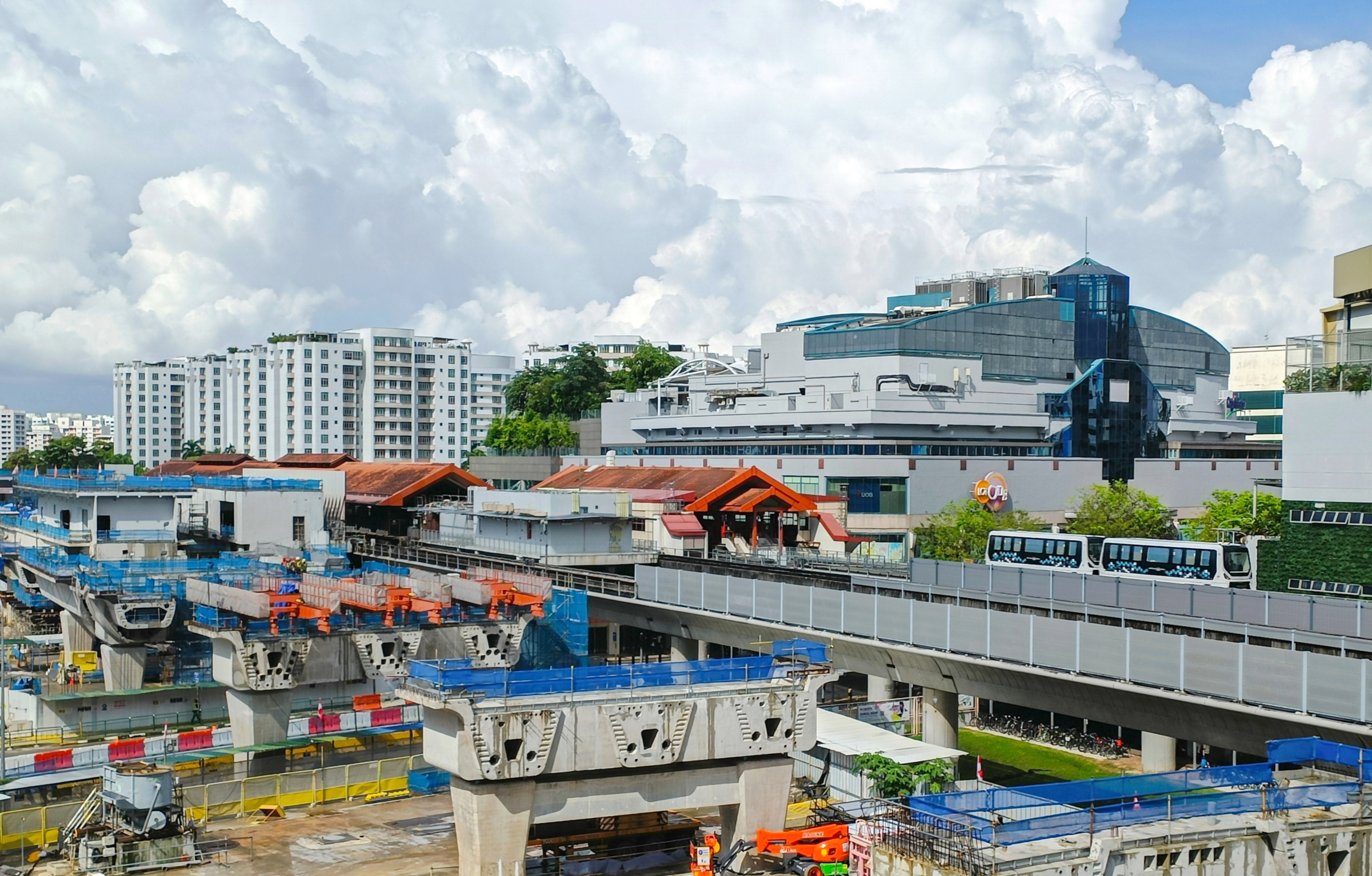
- Exterior of Choa Chu Kang MRT/LRT station beside the JRL construction site

General information
- Location: 10 Choa Chu Kang Avenue 4, Singapore 689810 (NSL); 60 Choa Chu Kang Avenue 4, Singapore 689960 (JRL); 15 Choa Chu Kang Avenue 4, Singapore 689813 (BPLRT)
- Coordinates: 01°23′06″N 103°44′40″E
- System: Mass Rapid Transit (MRT) / Light Rail Transit (LRT) interchange and terminus
- Owner: Land Transport Authority
- Operator: SMRT Trains (North–South Line, Bukit Panjang LRT); Singapore One Rail (Jurong Region Line)
- Line: North–South Line Jurong Region Line Bukit Panjang LRT
- Platforms: 10 (2 island platforms, 2 Spanish solution platforms + 2 island platforms (U/C))
- Tracks: 4 (2 MRT, 2 LRT) + 2 (U/C)
- Connections: Choa Chu Kang, Taxi

Construction
- Structure type: Elevated
- Platform levels: 2
- Parking: Yes (Lot One)
- Accessible: Yes

Other information
- Station code: CCK

History
- Opened: 10 March 1990; 36 years ago (Branch line); 10 February 1996; 30 years ago (Branch line merged with the North–South Line); 6 November 1999; 27 years ago (Bukit Panjang LRT line platforms 1 & 2); 27 December 2016; 9 years ago (Bukit Panjang LRT line platforms 3 & 4)
- Opening: mid-2028; 2 years' time (Jurong Region Line)
- Former names: Bukit Panjang

Passengers
- June 2024: 33,588 per day

Services
Preceding station	Mass Rapid Transit	Following station
Bukit Gombak towards Jurong East	North–South Line	Yew Tee towards Marina South Pier
Brickland towards Jurong East	North–South Line Future service	Yew Tee towards Marina South Pier
Terminus	Jurong Region Line Future service	Choa Chu Kang West towards Boon Lay
Preceding station	Light Rail Transit	Following station
Terminus	Bukit Panjang LRT Service A	South View towards Choa Chu Kang via Senja
Terminus	Bukit Panjang LRT Service B	South View towards Choa Chu Kang via Petir
Former services
Preceding station	Mass Rapid Transit	Following station
Bukit Gombak towards Jurong East	Branch Line	Terminus
Track layout
Location
- Location within Singapore Rail

Choa Chu Kang MRT/LRT station is an elevated Mass Rapid Transit (MRT) and Light Rail Transit (LRT) interchange station in Choa Chu Kang, Singapore. Serving the North–South Line (NSL) and the Bukit Panjang LRT line (BPLRT), the station is located near the Choa Chu Kang Bus Interchange and Lot One shopping centre. Other surrounding landmarks include Keat Hong Community Club and Choa Chu Kang Park.

First announced as Bukit Panjang, the station was built as part of Phase II of the initial MRT system and was completed in March 1990. Choa Chu Kang station became part of the NSL when the line extended to this station via Woodlands station in 1996. The BPLRT station opened on 6 November 1999.

The station saw other upgrades including the installation of half-height platform screen doors on the NSL platforms in 2012 and platform barriers for the LRT station in 2015. New side platforms were completed for the LRT station in December 2016 alongside widening the staircase connecting the MRT and LRT platforms to improve passenger flow in the station. In May 2018, it was announced that the station would be an interchange with the Jurong Region Line (JRL) upon the opening of its first stage in mid-2028.

== History ==
=== North–South Line ===
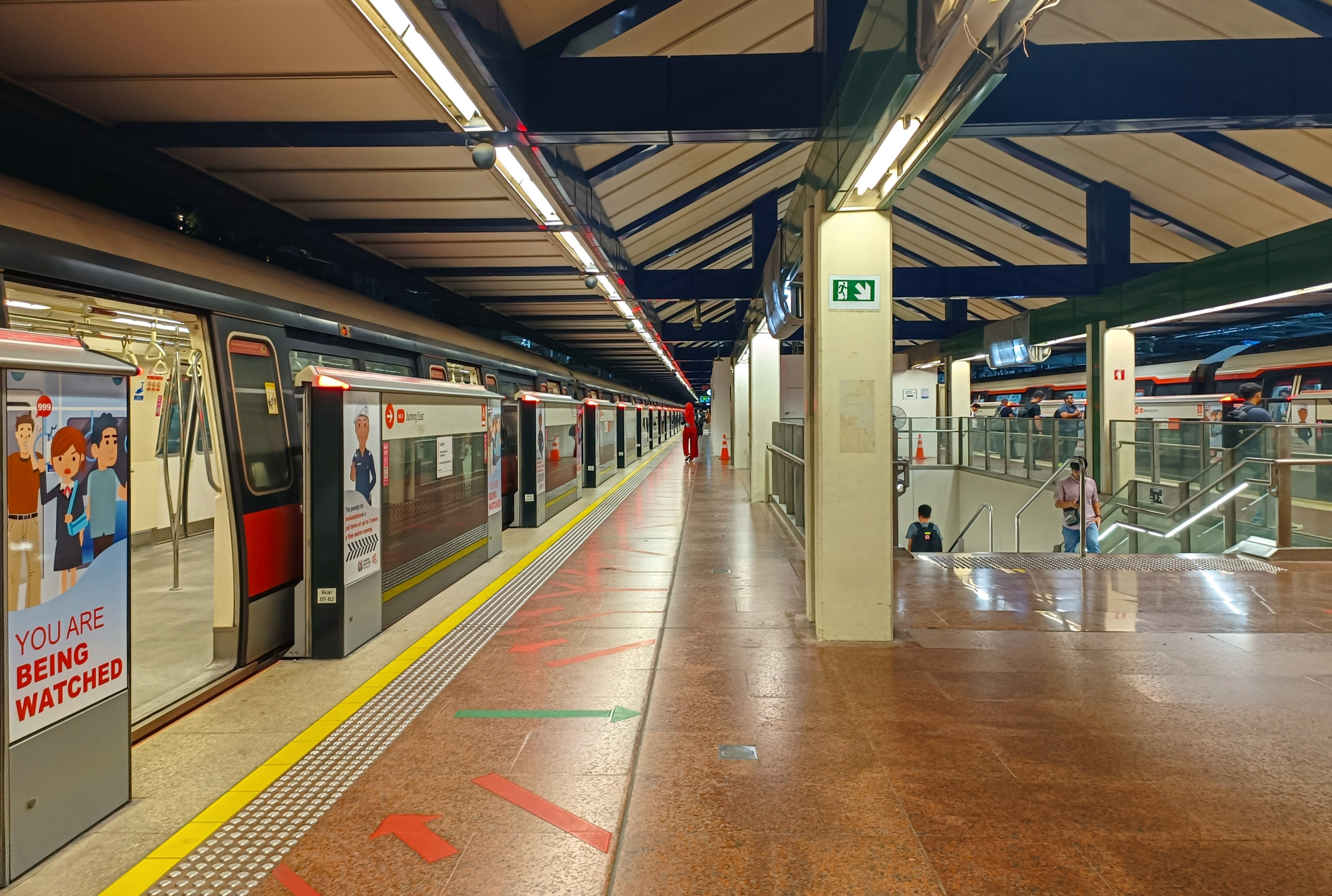
NSL platforms of Choa Chu Kang

The station, initially named Bukit Panjang, was announced in October 1983 and would be built as part of Phase II of the initial MRT system. Initially expected to be completed by 1992, the completion date of Phase II was pushed earlier to 1990.

The contract for the construction of Bukit Panjang station was awarded to a joint venture between RSEA International and Hock Lian Seng for S$99.8 million (US$131 million in 2021) in January 1986. The contract also included the construction of the Bukit Batok and Bukit Gombak stations, alongside 6 kilometres (3.7 miles) of viaducts. In March 1987, the station was renamed to Choa Chu Kang station.

The last viaduct beam between Bukit Gombak and Choa Chu Kang was laid on 9 January 1988. Choa Chu Kang station opened on 10 March 1990 and was the terminus of the Branch line (or Bukit Line), until it was incorporated into the North–South Line (NSL) with the Woodlands Extension on 10 February 1996.

=== Bukit Panjang LRT line ===
The station was planned to interchange with the Bukit Panjang LRT line, which was first announced by Communications Minister Mah Bow Tan in December 1994 as a government pilot project that could "extend the reach and accessibility of the MRT network". In February 1996, Prime Minister Goh Chok Tong announced that construction of the Bukit Panjang LRT would proceed, and was expected to be completed in three years at a projected cost of S$300 million (US$212.76 million).

The contract for the design and construction of the 8-kilometre (5.0-mile) LRT line was awarded to a joint venture – Keppel Corporation, Gammon, and Adtranz – for S$285 million (US$202.12 million). The LRT station opened along with the Bukit Panjang LRT line on 6 November 1999.

=== Upgrades ===
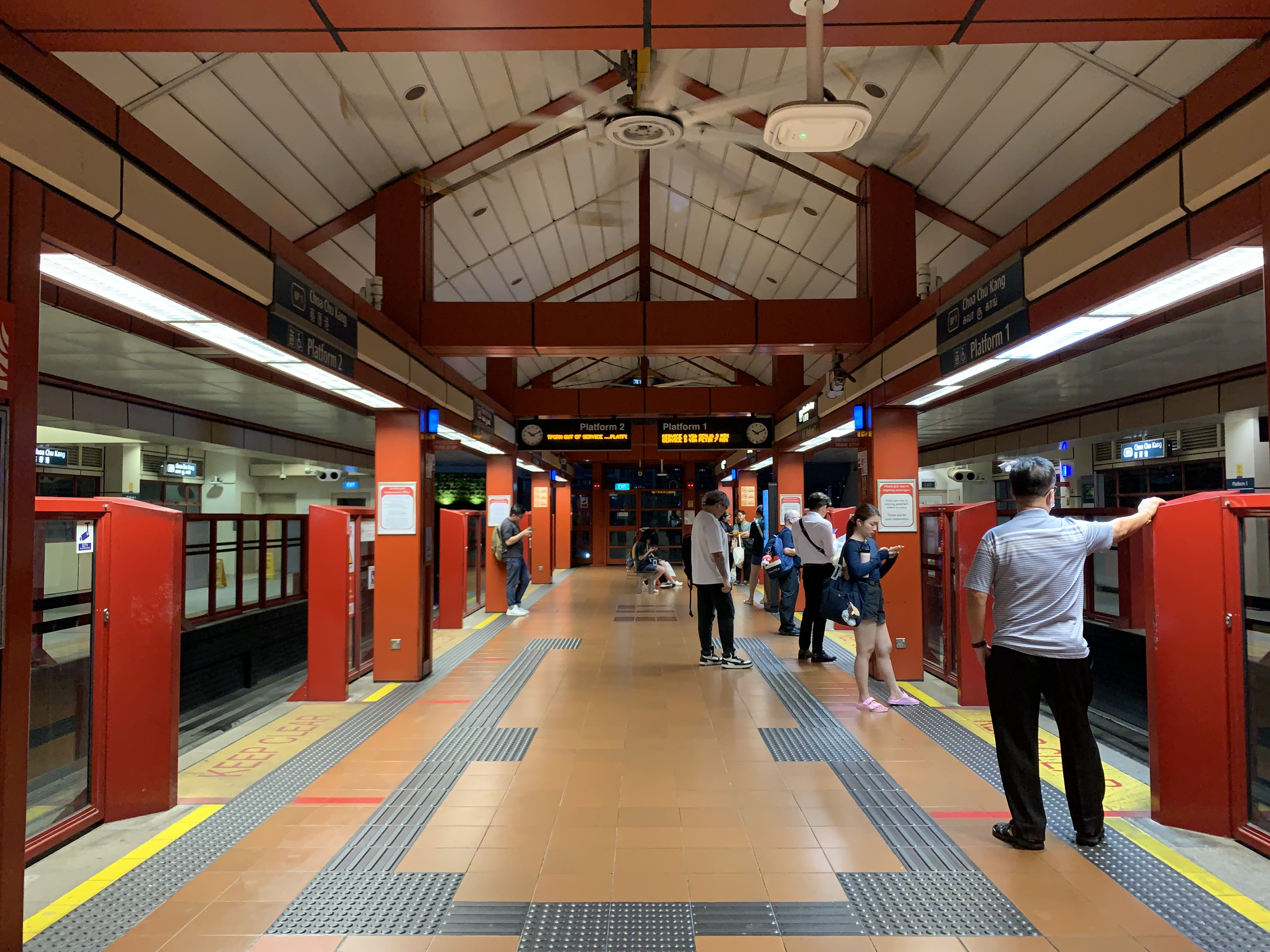
The LRT island platform with the side platforms for alighting commuters seen on both sides

When the LRT station first opened, its layout was an island platform. On 31 October 2012, the Land Transport Authority (LTA) announced that two additional exit-only side platforms would be built to ease crowding in the LRT station. The upgrades include widening the staircase connecting the MRT and LRT platforms, new fare gates and a covered linkway to the nearby Lot One shopping mall. The two new LRT exit-only platforms at the LRT station began operations on 27 December 2016, forming a Spanish solution layout and operation.

In 2012, half-height platform screen doors were installed on the MRT platforms as part of LTA's programme to improve safety in MRT stations. Between 2012 and 2013, high-volume low-speed fans were installed at this station to improve ventilation at the elevated station's platforms.

In 2015, platform barriers were installed on the LRT platforms. The Choa Chu Kang and Bukit Panjang stations were given priority for their installation due to projected high commuter traffic from the Downtown MRT line. These barriers were installed to prevent people from falling or trespassing on the tracks. However, unlike the MRT platform screen doors, these barriers have openings for train alignment rather than retractable doors. New ceiling fans were installed over the LRT platforms in 2018.

=== Jurong Region Line ===
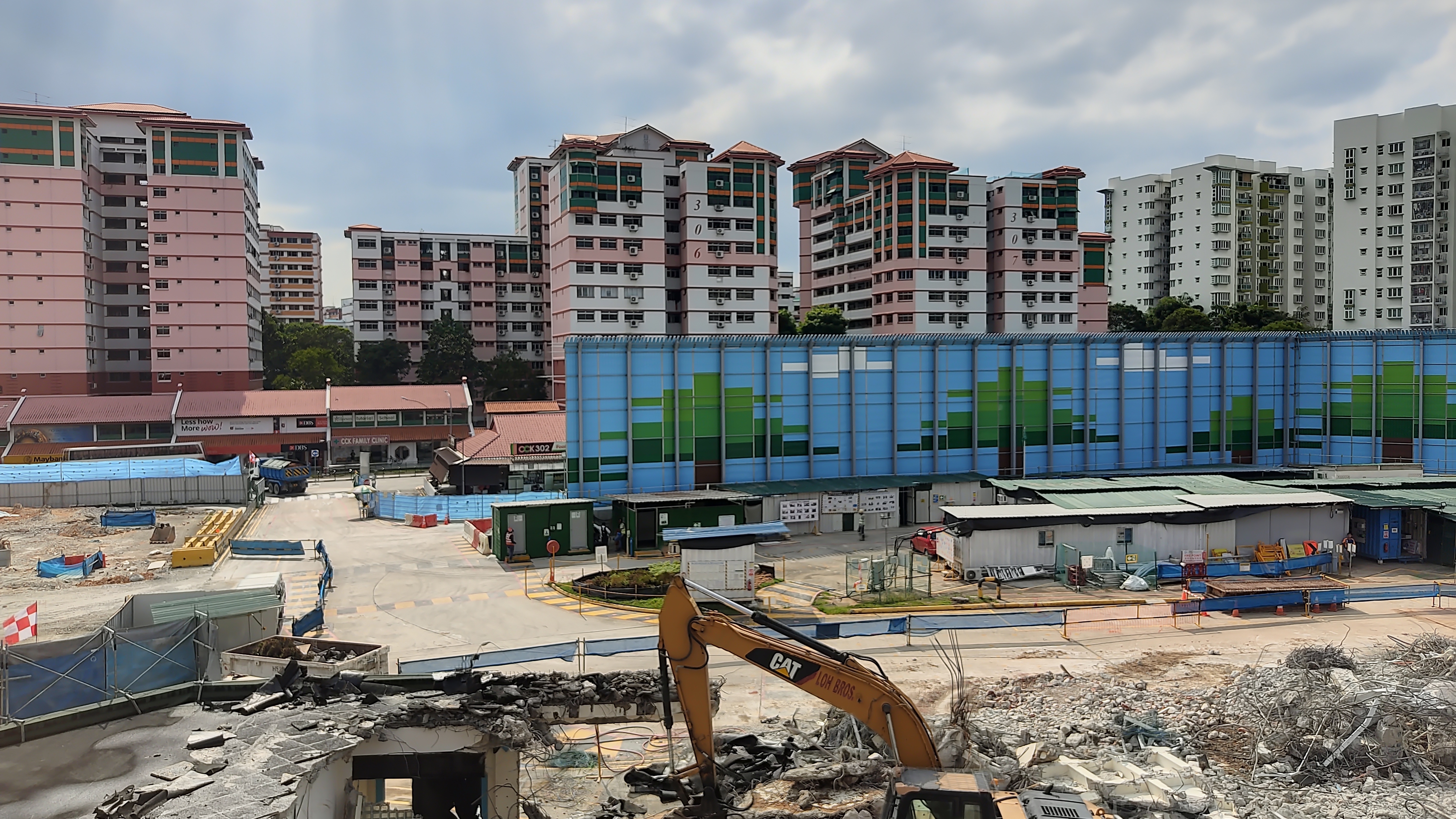
JRL construction works in February 2021

On 9 May 2018, the LTA announced Choa Chu Kang station will interchange with the proposed 24-kilometre (15 mi) Jurong Region Line (JRL). The station will be constructed as part of Stage 1 (JRL West), consisting of 10 stations from this station to Bahar Junction and two branches to Tawas and Boon Lay. This stage was expected to be completed in 2026. However, restrictions on construction due to the COVID-19 pandemic has led to delays, with the completion date pushed to 2027. Due to construction and testing delays, the completion date was further delayed to mid-2028.

The contract for the design and construction of the JRL station and associated viaducts was awarded to Shanghai Tunnel Engineering Co. (Singapore) Pte Ltd for S$465.2 million (US$341 million). The contract also includes the design and construction of the Choa Chu Kang West and Tengah stations along with 3.4 kilometres (2.1 miles) of associated viaducts. Aurecon has been appointed lead consultant of the project.

The Choa Chu Kang Bus Interchange was relocated to a new site at the junction of Choa Chu Kang Loop and Choa Chu Kang Drive on 16 December 2018. Demolition of Block 303, an adjacent multi-storey car park, began in December 2020 to make way for JRL construction works.

== Details ==
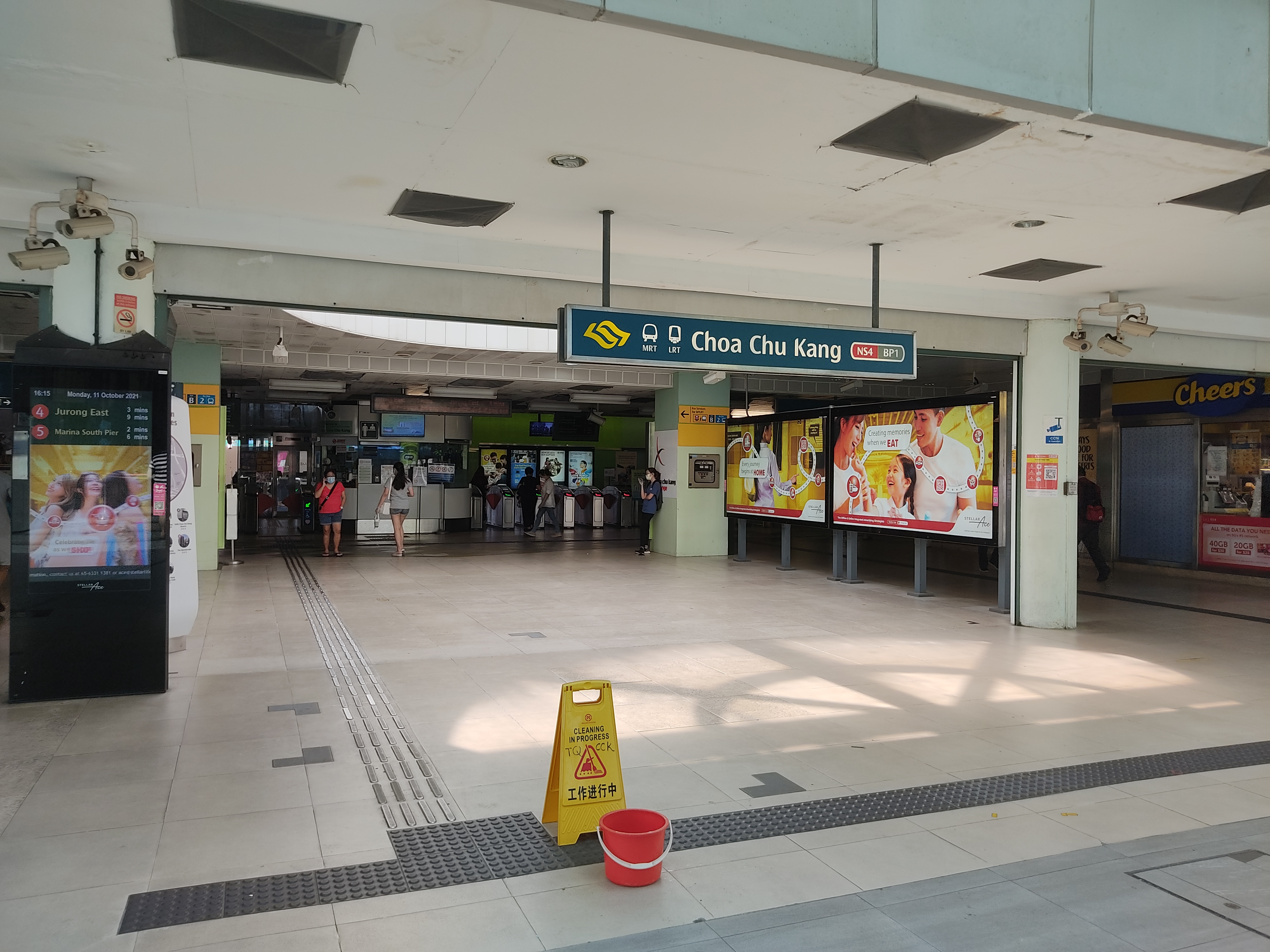
Exit A of Choa Chu Kang station

Choa Chu Kang station serves the North–South Line (NSL) and is the terminus of the Bukit Panjang LRT line (BPLRT), with the official station code NS4/BP1. The station is between the Bukit Gombak and Yew Tee stations on the NSL, and the adjacent station on the BPLRT is South View. The station was previously the terminus of the Bukit MRT line (or Branch Line), a branch service connecting the station to Jurong East station on the East–West Line. This branch was later incorporated into the NSL. The station will also be the terminus of the JRL, with the adjacent station being Choa Chu Kang West station.

The NSL station has a "pitched" roof design shaped like an inverted "V", and brick walls that match the surrounding HDB blocks. Like many stations on the initial MRT network, the NSL station has an island platform. The LRT station has a Spanish solution platform configuration. The JRL station will be 139 metres (456 ft) long and 30 metres (98 ft) wide.

Choa Chu Kang station is located between Choa Chu Kang Avenue 4 and Choa Chu Kang Loop. Besides the surrounding HDB blocks, the station serves various landmarks including Choa Chu Kang Temporary Bus Interchange, Lot One Shoppers' Mall, Choa Chu Kang Community Club, Keat Hong Community Club, Choa Chu Kang Park and South View Primary School.

The station features a mural by APSN Katong School as part of SMRT's Comic Connect. Unveiled on 17 November 2024, it was the final artwork commissioned for the project. The artwork illustrates the historical development of Choa Chu Kang, featuring Kampong Belimbing, a colonial-era village formerly located in the area, and the Choa Chu Kang Educational Farms. The mural also highlights landmarks such as the military-themed playground at Brickland in Keat Hong Mirage and the Bukit Panjang LRT, which launched in 1999 as Singapore's first Light Rail Transit system.
