= Branch Line (Singapore) =

Former Mass Rapid Transit line in Singapore

Overview
- Native name: Malay: Laluan MRT Cawangan; Chinese: 地铁支线; Tamil: கிளை எம்ஆர்டி வரி
- Owner: Mass Rapid Transit Corporation
- Termini: Jurong East; Choa Chu Kang
- Stations: 4

Service
- Type: Rapid transit
- System: Mass Rapid Transit (Singapore)
- Services: 1
- Operator(s): Singapore MRT Limited
- Rolling stock: Kawasaki Heavy Industries C151 (KHI); Siemens C651 (SIE)

History
- Opened: 10 March 1990; 36 years ago
- Closed: 10 February 1996; 30 years ago (merged with the North South line)

Technical
- Line length: 6.5 km (4.0 mi)
- Character: Fully elevated
- Track gauge: 1,435 mm (4 ft 8 1/2 in) standard gauge
- Electrification: 750 V DC third rail
- Operating speed: Limit of 80 km/h (50 mph)

The Branch Line, also known as the Bukit Line, is a former Mass Rapid Transit (MRT) line in Singapore that was the third while it existed. Initially operating as a branch to the existing East–West Line (EWL), the line was 6.5 kilometres (4.0 mi) long with four stations, and was operated by the Mass Rapid Transit Corporation (now privatised as SMRT Trains).

The line took about ten minutes to travel from one end to the other and was coloured brown and khaki on the rail map. It now forms a part of the North–South Line (NSL), making it the only defunct line in Singapore. It terminated at the centre track of Jurong East station (then platforms C/D, now D/E). Trains operated at a six-minute frequency.

== History ==
The line was conceptualised as the Western line during the early planning stages of the Singapore MRT network.

On 7 January 1986, the Taiwanese RSEA International and Hock Lian Seng Joint Venture were awarded the contract for the Branch MRT line stations – Bukit Batok, Bukit Gombak and Choa Chu Kang. The line started operations on 10 March 1990, and was named the Branch Line, consisting of four stations.

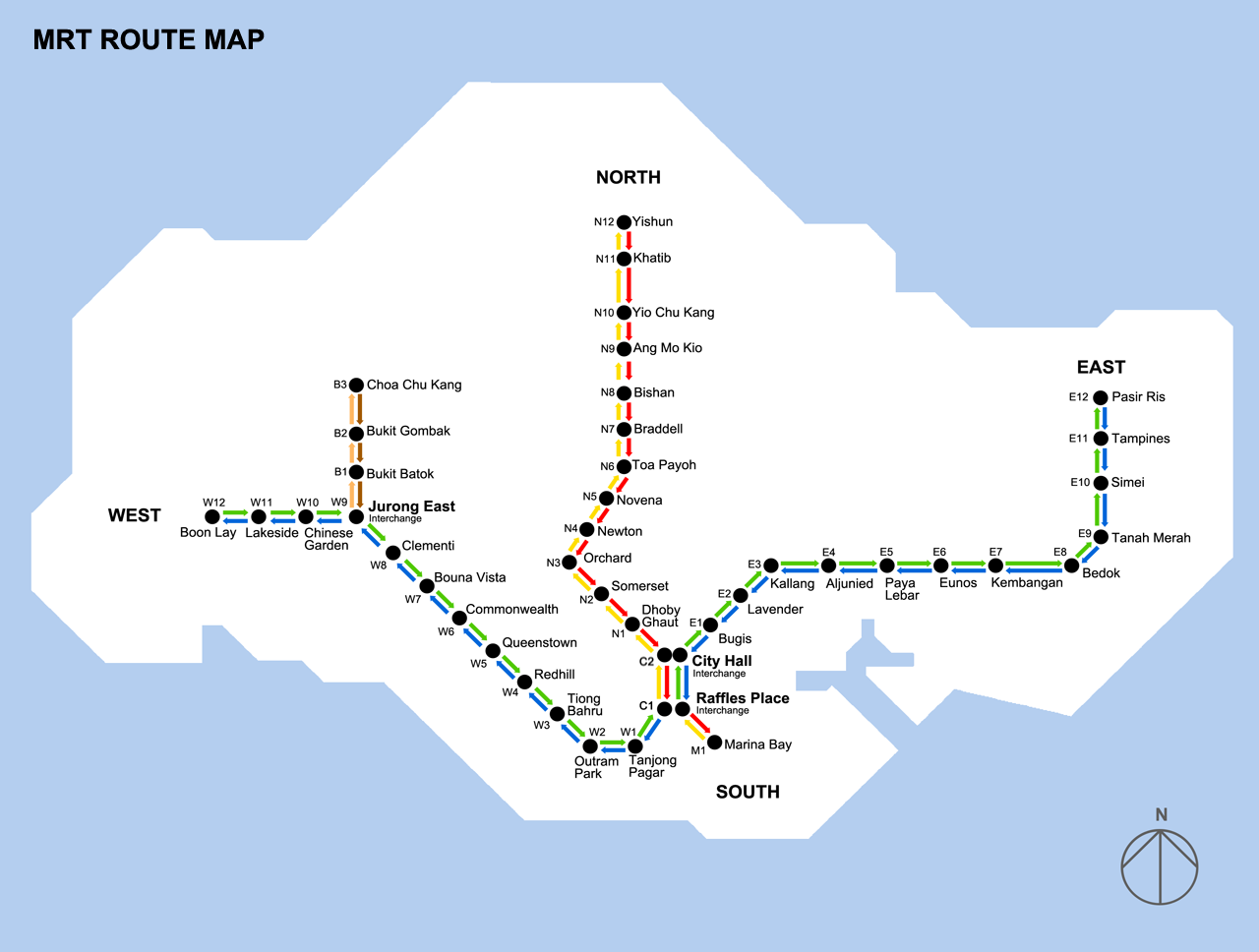
The branch line (from Jurong East station to Choa Chu Kang station in khaki and brown) on a recreation of the old MRT map (1989-1996)

=== Fate ===
The line was subsequently merged into the North–South Line (NSL) when the Woodlands extension opened on 10 February 1996, connecting the existing NSL at Yishun to the Branch line at Choa Chu Kang. The station codes for Bukit Batok to Choa Chu Kang stations were changed to N23, N22 and N21 respectively, subsequently to their current code on the North South line with the revamp of the system map on 31 July 2001.

== Stations ==
| Station code | Station name | Interchange |
|---|---|---|
| W9 | Jurong East | East–West Line |
| B1 | Bukit Batok | —N/a |
| B2 | Bukit Gombak | —N/a |
| B3 | Choa Chu Kang | —N/a |
