= Brickland MRT station =

Future Mass Rapid Transit station in Singapore

Brickland NS3A 红砖 பிரிக்லேன்ட்
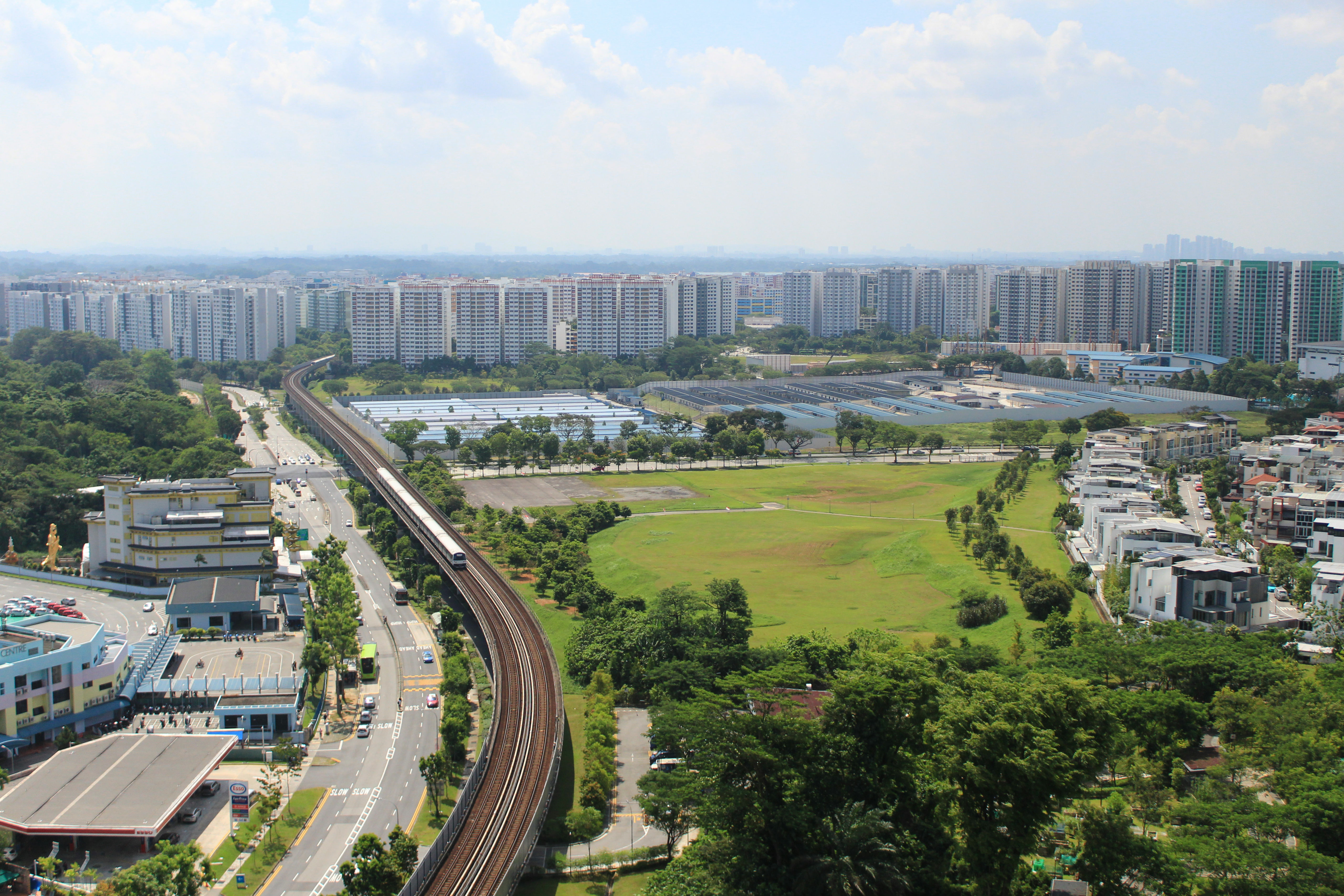
- Future site of Brickland station, located at where the train is

General information
- Coordinates: 1°22′07″N 103°44′58″E
- System: Future Mass Rapid Transit (MRT) station
- Owner: Land Transport Authority
- Operator: SMRT Trains Ltd (SMRT Corporation)
- Line: North–South Line
- Platforms: 2 (2 side platforms)

Construction
- Structure type: Elevated
- Accessible: Yes

History
- Opening: 2034; 8 years' time

Services
Preceding station	Mass Rapid Transit	Following station
Bukit Gombak towards Jurong East	North–South Line Future service	Choa Chu Kang towards Marina South Pier
Location
- Location within Singapore Rail

Brickland MRT station is a future Mass Rapid Transit (MRT) station on the North–South Line located in Singapore. It will serve Choa Chu Kang Neighbourhood 8 as well as Pavilion Park and Tengah Brickland District.

== History ==
=== Planning ===
Artist impression of Brickland station

Brickland station was first announced on 25 May 2019 as part of the Land Transport Authority's (LTA) Land Transport Master Plan 2040. The station was planned to serve approximately 13,000 existing households from Keat Hong, Bukit Batok West, Pavilion Park, Tengah town’s Brickland district, and future residential developments. Officially confirmed on 28 July 2023, the station was initially targeted to begin construction in 2024, with a completion date of 2034. Construction works for the station will include a new viaduct and crossover tracks.

=== Construction ===
On 30 December 2025, the contract for the design and construction of Brickland MRT station and associated viaducts was awarded to Obayashi Corporation for S$281 million. Construction is slated to begin in the first half of 2026. The station construction can only take place during maintenance hours at night.

== Details ==
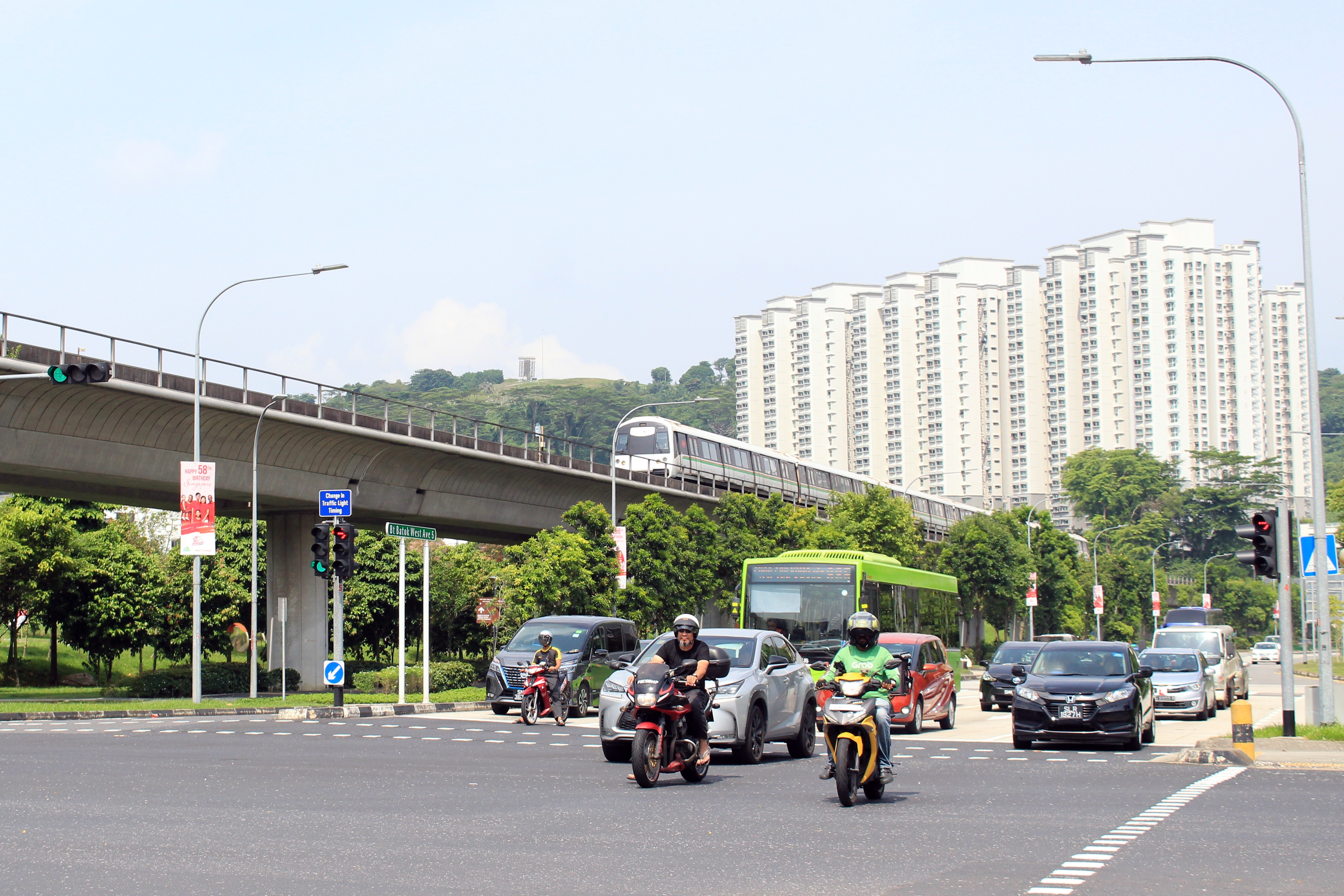
Road level of the future Brickland MRT station

Serving the North–South Line (NSL), Brickland station will be between Bukit Gombak and Choa Chu Kang stations. The official station code will be NS3A. The station will be constructed along Bukit Batok West Avenue 5 near the junction with Bukit Batok Road.
