= North–South Line (Singapore) =

Mass Rapid Transit line in Singapore

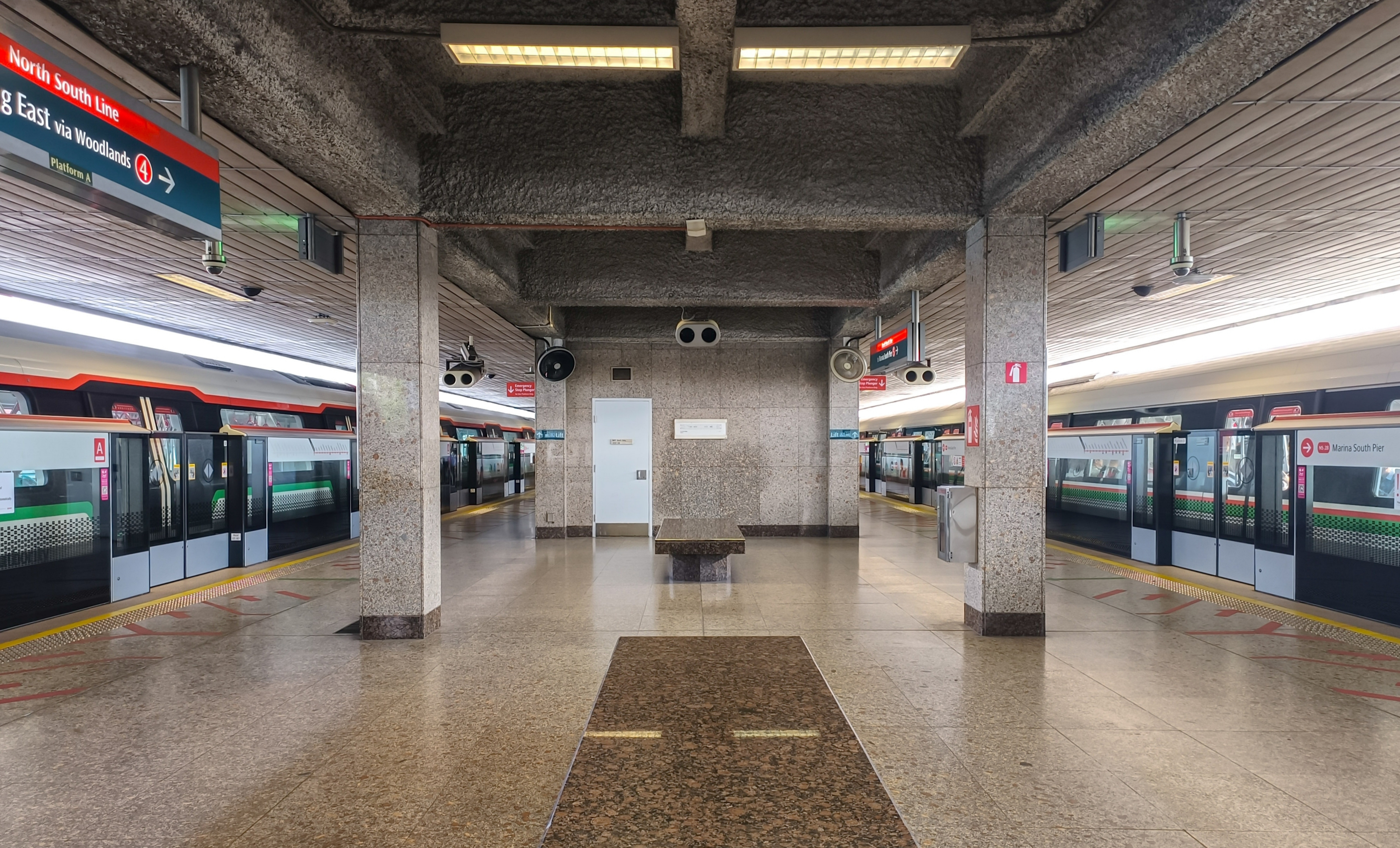
- Yio Chu Kang station, one of the oldest stations on the line when it opened as part of the inaugural section

Overview
- Native name: Malay: Laluan MRT Utara Selatan; Chinese: 南北地铁线; Tamil: வடக்கு-தெற்கு ரயில் பாதை
- Status: Operational
- Owner: Land Transport Authority
- Line number: NS
- Locale: Singapore
- Termini: Jurong East; Marina South Pier
- Stations: 29 (27 operational, 2 under construction)
- Colour on map: Red (#d42e12)

Service
- Type: Rapid transit
- System: Mass Rapid Transit (Singapore)
- Services: 2
- Operator: SMRT Trains (SMRT Corporation)
- Depot(s): Bishan; Ulu Pandan
- Rolling stock: Kawasaki–Sifang C151A (KSF A); Kawasaki–Sifang C151B (KSF B); Kawasaki–Sifang C151C (KSF C); Alstom Movia R151 (ALS)
- Daily ridership: 456,323 (July 2020)

History
- Planned opening: 2034; 8 years' time (Brickland); 2035; 9 years' time (Sungei Kadut)
- Opened: 7 November 1987; 39 years ago (First section); 4 November 1989; 37 years ago (Initial line complete); 10 February 1996; 30 years ago (Woodlands extension); 23 November 2014; 11 years ago (Marina South Pier); 2 November 2019; 7 years ago (Canberra)

Technical
- Line length: 45 km (28 mi)
- Track length: 45 km (28 mi)
- Character: Elevated (Jurong East – Ang Mo Kio); Open-cut (Bishan); Underground (Braddell – Marina South Pier)
- Track gauge: 1,435 mm (4 ft 8 1/2 in) standard gauge
- Electrification: 750 V DC third rail
- Operating speed: limit of 80 km/h (50 mph)

The North–South Line (NSL) is a high-capacity Mass Rapid Transit (MRT) line in Singapore. Operated by SMRT Corporation, it is coloured red on the rail map and 45 kilometres (28 mi) long. It serves 27 stations, 11 of which, between Braddell and Marina South Pier, are underground. The line runs from Jurong East station in the west of the country to Marina South Pier in the city-centre via Woodlands station in the north. It operates for almost 20 hours a day (from approximately 5am to 1am the next day), with headways of 1 to 2 minutes during peak hours and 5 to 6 minutes during off-peak hours. All trains on the NSL run with a six-car formation.

Commenced on 22 October 1983, the NSL was the first MRT line to be built in Singapore. The inaugural section from Yio Chu Kang station to Toa Payoh began service on 7 November 1987, followed by a southwards extension to Raffles Place station on 12 December that same year and one northwards to Yishun station on 20 December 1988. After the southern extension to Marina Bay station opened on 4 November 1989, the NSL was formed and split from the East–West Line (EWL). During the 1990s, the Branch Line, which ran from Jurong East to Choa Chu Kang, was extended northwards towards Woodlands, before turning south to Yishun where it became part of the NSL.

With the NSL's status as the oldest and heavily utilised MRT line and its ageing infrastructure, significant improvements have been made to it since the 2010s. They include the replacement of sleepers, third rail and the introduction of new rolling stocks, the C151B, C151C and R151, which gradually supersede the older rolling stocks and increasing passenger capacity. Other recent developments of the line include a new extension to Marina South Pier station on 23 November 2014 and a new infill station, Canberra station, on 2 November 2019. The NSL is also the first line to have undergone a major re-signalling project, converting it from semi-automatic to fully automated operations in 2019. Two more infill stations, Brickland and Sungei Kadut stations, are under planning and set to open in the 2030s.

== History ==
=== Initial developments ===
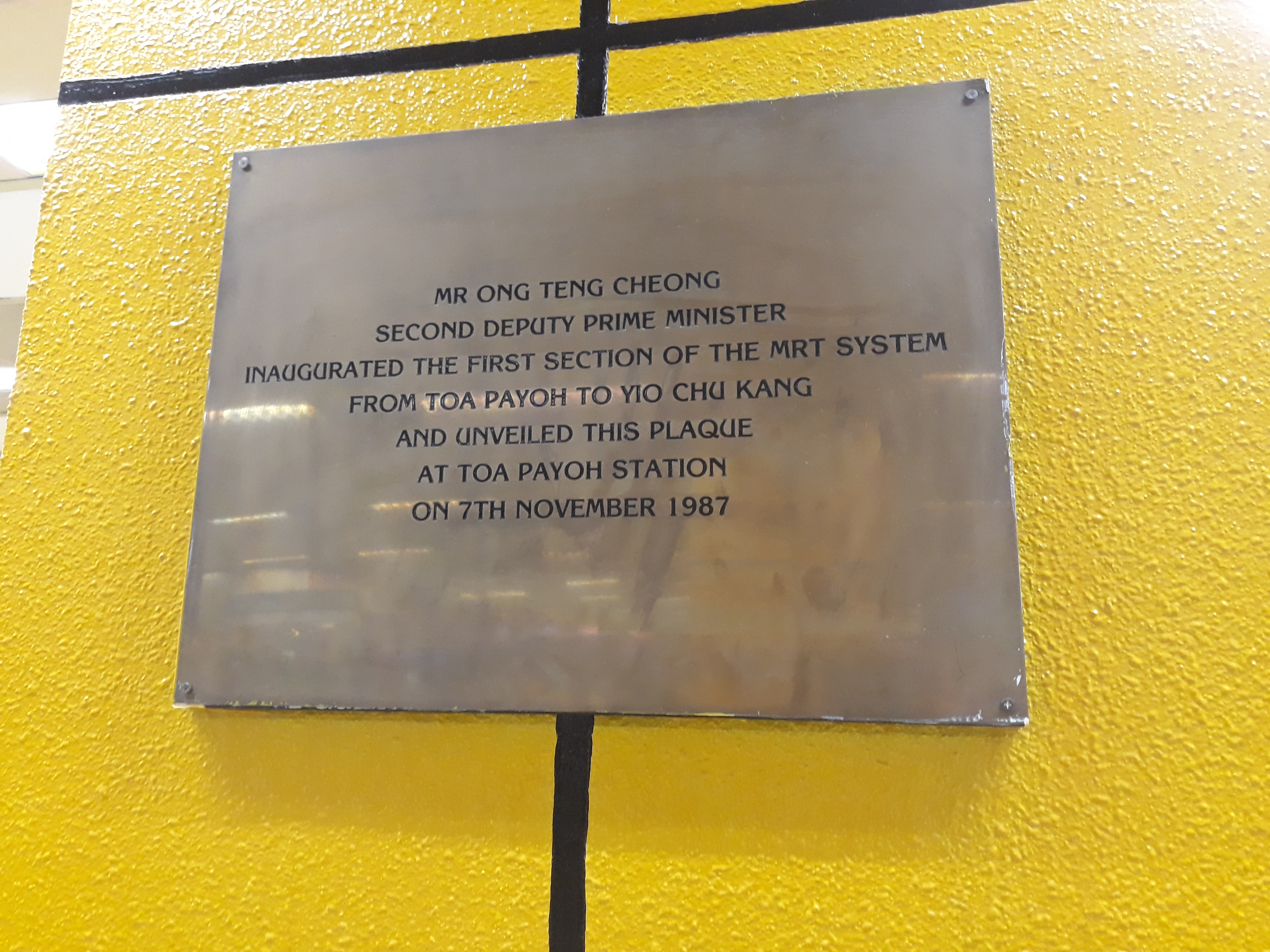
A plaque at Toa Payoh station commemorating the opening of the first phase of the Singapore MRT

The Mass Rapid Transit (MRT) originated from a forecast in 1967 by the planners of the State and City Planning Project, which stated the need for a rail-based urban transport system in Singapore by 1992. Following a debate on whether a bus-only system would be more cost-effective, then-Minister for Communications Ong Teng Cheong came to the conclusion that an all-bus system would be inadequate, as it would have to compete for road space in the land-scarce country.

After deciding on a rail-based system, the construction of Phase I of the MRT system, which will be the North–South Line, was given priority as the line passes through areas having a higher demand for public transport, such as the densely populated housing estates of Toa Payoh and Ang Mo Kio and the Central Area. The line was expected to relieve the traffic congestion on the Thomson–Sembawang road corridor. Construction of the MRT line (and also the MRT system itself) started on 22 October 1983, and the first section from Yio Chu Kang station to Toa Payoh station opened on 7 November 1987. At the inauguration ceremony, Ong Teng Cheong, who backed and commissioned the planning of the MRT system, attended the ceremony as a special Guest of Honour. Dr Yeo Ning Hong, the Minister For Communications and Information, inaugurated the start of MRT operations and announced it to be the "beginning" of the MRT system.

Nine more stations from Novena station to Outram Park station via Raffles Place opened on 12 December that year. The line was extended northward to Yishun station on 20 December 1988 as part of phase 2B and it began independent operations on 4 November 1989 as the North–South Line when the extension to Marina Bay station was opened.

=== Woodlands extension ===
The growth of the Mass Rapid Transit (MRT) system demonstrates the Government's commitment to develop a top-rate public transport system for the benefit of our people. Now [the Woodlands residents] too can enjoy the high quality service provided by the MRT... Achieving a world class land transport system takes time. Whether we can do so or not does not depend on the Government alone. It depends on all of us. If the people and the Government continue to work together, as we have done in the past, we will produce the economic growth and budget surpluses to build, not just a world-class transport system, but also the most attractive Singapore for our children to grow up in the 21st Century.

— Then-Prime Minister Goh Chok Tong, at the official opening of the Woodlands MRT line, on 10 February 1996.

After the Branch Line opened in 1990, the Woodlands MRT line was envisioned so as to close the gap between Yishun and Choa Chu Kang stations. Numerous changes were made to the number of stations for the extension mainly to accommodate the 1991 Concept Plan by the Urban Redevelopment Authority, which aimed to make Woodlands a regional centre for northern Singapore.

During the initial planning of the line, Sembawang station was only intended as a provisional station, to be built at a later date due to the underdevelopment of Sembawang, and construction began on 19 November 1992. Sembawang station and Kranji station were later included in the construction after the second round of planning (construction began at the same time on 19 November 1992) and Sungei Kadut station was then omitted. Sungei Kadut will be built later if the town's population justifies the necessity for the station.

During the construction, a total of 19 new trains were purchased for almost S$259 million for the new MRT line, designed by German company Siemens Aktiengesellschaft, to complement the 66 first-generation C151 trains. There was also a need to level the land covered in thick vegetation in Kadut, Woodlands and Sembawang for the MRT line.

With the official opening of the Woodlands extension on 10 February 1996 by then Prime Minister Goh Chok Tong, the Branch Line was incorporated into the North–South Line. The extension was built at a cost of $1.2 billion.

=== Subsequent developments ===
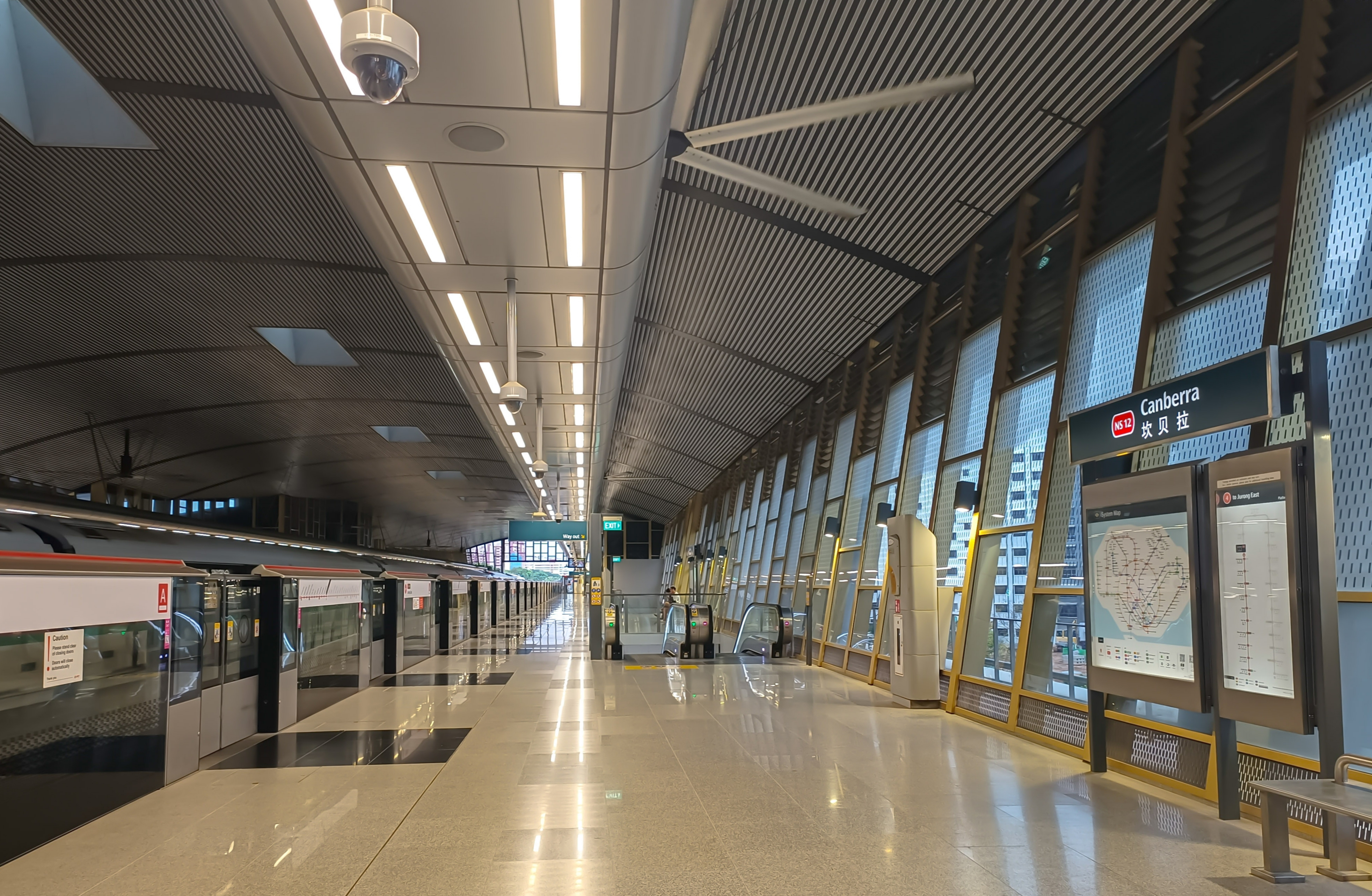
Canberra MRT station

The NSL platforms of the Bishan station underwent major alterations to increase the passenger capacity of the station from 1,250 to 2,020. A new air-conditioned platform to serve southbound trains then to Marina Bay was constructed and opened for service on 27 July 2008, connected to Junction 8 via Exit E. The station was expanded to handle increased passenger traffic when the CCL station opens. As the original platform, now serving northbound trains to Jurong East, remained in service, upgrading works for the platform (Platform A) was hindered and took about a year to complete. While the re-tiling of the platform was done during the day, the Platform Screen Doors (PSDs) were installed in sections through the night. An air-conditioning system was also installed as part of the upgrade. Upgrading works for the platform were fully completed on 23 May 2009.

Under the Land Transport Master Plan 2008, the Jurong East Modification Project entailed the construction of a new platform and the addition of a fourth track to Jurong East station to reduce waiting times and crowding at the station during peak hours. The modification project was completed on 27 May 2011. The track and platform was initially opened during morning peak hours only, but since December 2011, they also operate during the evening peak hours.

In the 2008 Land Transport Master Plan, the 1-kilometre (0.6 mi) North–South Line extension was announced as one of the upcoming projects rolled out by the Land Transport Authority to expand Singapore's rail network. The one-kilometre extension from Marina Bay to Marina South Pier station was opened on 23 November 2014. This extension serves the Marina South Pier, the Marina Bay Cruise Centre Singapore, and future developments in the Marina Bay Downtown area.

On 17 January 2013, the Land Transport Authority (LTA) announced that a feasibility study was conducted to construct Canberra MRT station. The feasibility study was completed in 2014 and LTA announced Canberra as a new station. Construction of Canberra station commenced on 26 March 2016. The station, which is an infill station with side platforms, was built along an operational section of the line between Sembawang and Yishun. The station cost S$90 million to build, and is meant to serve upcoming developments at the vicinity. Canberra station opened on 2 November 2019.

In 2025, the LTA announced that 40 stations on the North–South and East–West lines will gain public artworks, as part of expansion of the Art in Transit programme.

=== Incidents ===
On 3 March 2003, a 23-year-old man lost control of his vehicle along Lentor Avenue, crashed through the fence, and landed on a stretch of track between Yio Chu Kang and Khatib stations. The incident forced a train carrying hundreds of commuters to come to a screeching halt, but not before flattening the front of the car. The accident disrupted train services for more than three hours and cost SMRT between S$100,000 and $150,000 in damages and lost revenue.

On 15 December 2011, train services between Bishan and Marina Bay stations were disrupted due to damage sustained on the power rail between City Hall and Dhoby Ghaut. Trains along this stretch were stalled and caused a service disruption until 11:40 pm on that day. Two days later, a similar problem caused a seven-hour disruption between Ang Mo Kio and Marina Bay. According to SMRT, the disruption was caused by damage to the third rail and the trains' collector shoes. Seven trains were damaged in this incident. These two service disruptions on the North–South line were both related to damaged rail, and became one of the worst disruption since SMRT's inception in 1987.

On 7 July 2015, train services on the North–South and East–West lines were temporarily disrupted due to massive power trips detected along both lines. A cause of the disruption was due to damaged insulators which caused a failure to properly supply power. For this disruption that brought inconvenience to 413,000 commuters, LTA imposed a 'record' fine of S$5.4 million on SMRT.

On 7 October 2017, a 20-hour long disruption started due to flooding in the tunnels between Braddell station and Bishan station due to a faulty drainage system, resulting in disruption of train services between Ang Mo Kio and Marina South Pier stations in both directions for several hours. A trackside fire between Raffles Place and Marina Bay stations further exacerbated the disruption. Train services between Marina South Pier and Newton resumed at about 9:20 pm on the same day, followed by Newton and Ang Mo Kio at around 2 pm the following day. Although no injuries or casualties were reported from the incident, SMRT fired a total of eight employees from the maintenance crew and incurred a S$2 million fine.

On 14 October 2020, train services from Jurong East to Woodlands stations were disrupted for more than three and a half hours, owing to a faulty power cable, which affected the East–West Line and Circle Line too. The power fault began at 7 pm and by 7:30 pm, commuters were stuck in the trains. Free bus bridging services were activated at all affected stations, and bus operators increased the frequency of regular services serving these areas. Service resumed at all stations along the North–South and East–West Lines at 10:35 pm. A total of 36 stations were affected by the power fault. The incident led to a replacement of 150km of power cables for the Tuas West Extension and two SMRT staff being suspended.

On 27 October 2023, trains skipped Novena MRT station for about 2 hours during the evening travel peak, after an air-conditioning unit filled the underground station with smoke. Free bus bridging services were provided between Newton MRT station and Toa Payoh MRT station, and ended shortly after the station was reopened at around 7:30pm.

On 3 June 2024, around 5.50pm, a lightning strike caused traction power to trip, as well as a small fire breaking out in a power control box next to the train track located about 20 metres from the platform of Kranji MRT station. No injuries were reported. This resulted in train services to be suspended between Choa Chu Kang and Woodlands stations for more than two hours. According to the Singapore Civil Defence Force, the fire had burned itself out before its officers arrived. Train services were progressively restored at 8.10pm.

=== Future plans ===
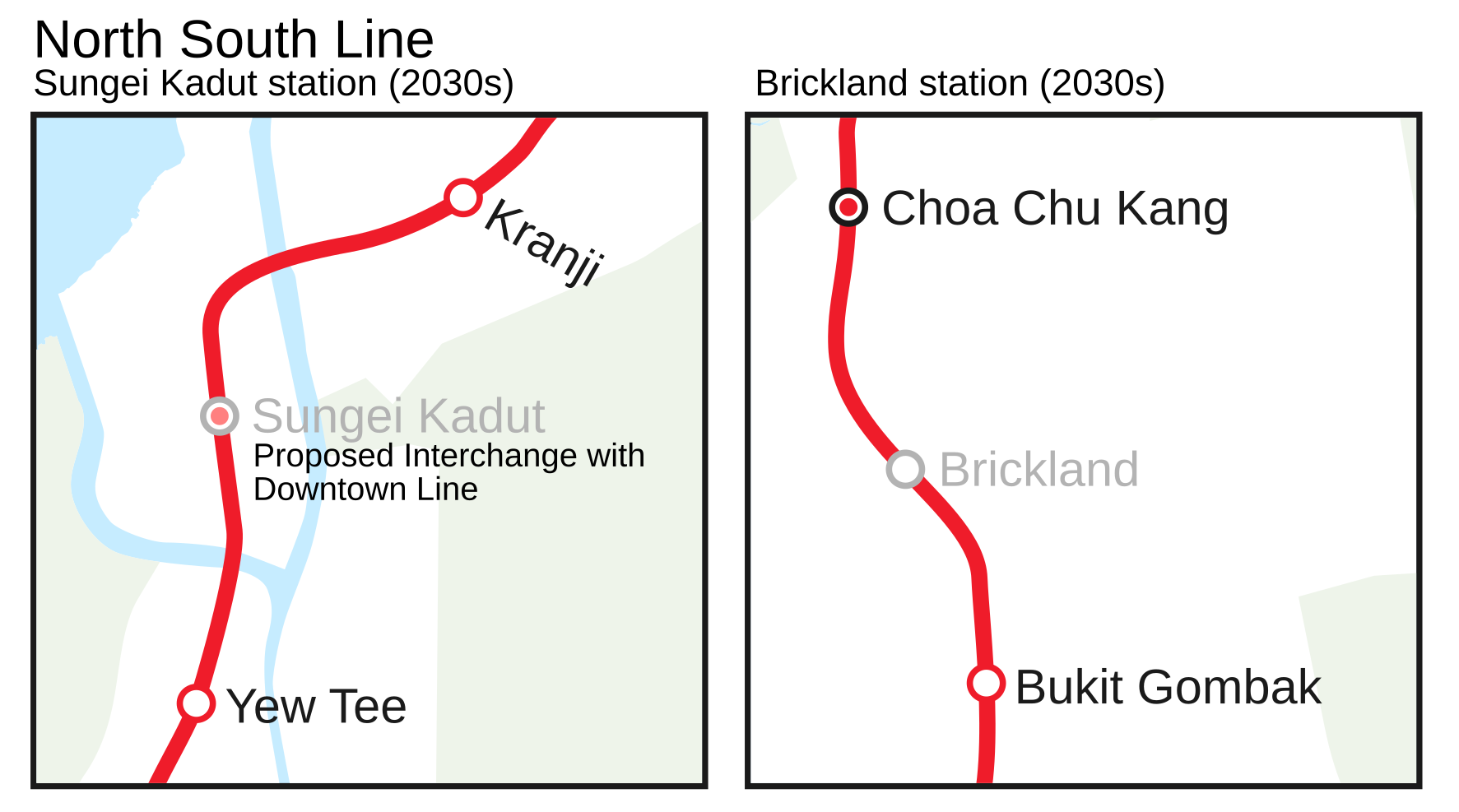
Locator maps of Brickland and Sungei Kadut stations

In the Land Transport Master Plan 2040 (LTMP2040), two new infill stations are projected to be built along the existing North–South Line. Brickland station will be built between Bukit Gombak and Choa Chu Kang stations, while Sungei Kadut station will be built between Yew Tee and Kranji stations and provide an additional interchange with the Downtown Line. Both MRT stations are expected to be opened by 2034 and 2035 respectively.

== Network and operations ==
=== Services ===
Train services on the North–South Line operate from approximately 5:30 am to around midnight daily. In general, during peak hours, train frequency is 2 to 3 minutes while during non-peak hours the frequency is reduced to 5 minutes throughout the entire route. Each day, the first train begins service at the following timings:

- 4:59 am (5:19 am on Sundays and public holidays) from Jurong East to Yew Tee stations, which will reach one loop at 5:27 am.
- 5:00 am (5:22 am on Sundays and public holidays) from Ang Mo Kio to Yew Tee stations, which will reach Yew Tee at 5:33 am.
- 5:05 am (5:25 am on Sundays and public holidays) from Jurong East to Ang Mo Kio stations, which will reach Ang Mo Kio at 5:48 am.
- 5:10 am (5:30 am on Sundays and public holidays) from Ang Mo Kio as downroute to start at Bishan station, which will reach Bishan at 5:45 am.

Extra downroute trips were added to start from Newton, Bishan and Kranji to cater to the demand. From 11pm onwards, selected trains from Jurong East station will terminate at either Ang Mo Kio, Toa Payoh or Yew Tee stations, with trains terminating at Kranji or Woodlands during special occasion such as Eve of Public Holidays. Selected trains departing from Marina South Pier station will also terminate at Kranji, Yishun or Ang Mo Kio stations in the late evenings. There are no express services. Additionally, short-working trips do run from Yishun to Marina South Pier, which only operate during peak hours.

In the late 2010s, services on the North–South Line were also subjected to maintenance and renewal works, usually on selected Fridays, Saturdays or Sundays, with shuttle bus services occasionally provided throughout the duration of the early closures and late openings for affected commuters. Operations of the North–South Line were affected by the COVID-19 pandemic, leading to the drop in ridership.

=== Route ===
Geographically accurate map of the North–South MRT line.

The North–South line forms an incomplete loop from Jurong East in the West Region of Singapore, north to Woodlands and Sembawang, and south to the Central Area. It is 45 kilometres (28 mi) long and is predominantly double-tracked, but certain short sections at the Woodlands, Yishun and Ang Mo Kio stations widen to three tracks, and four tracks at Jurong East station. The line begins above ground at Jurong East station from where it continues north on a set of elevated viaducts, with the exception of a short tunnel between the Bukit Batok and Bukit Gombak stations, and a surface section of track between the Bukit Gombak and Choa Chu Kang stations. The line curves from the Yew Tee to Kranji stations and continues eastwards, paralleling Woodlands Avenue 3 (which the line briefly cuts underneath between Kranji and Marsiling stations) and Avenue 7 main roads.

After Sembawang station, the line follows the route of Canberra Link and Yishun Avenue 2, curving southwards. Between Khatib and Yio Chu Kang stations parallel to Lentor Avenue, the line continues at surface level; this section is the longest distance between any two MRT stations in Singapore. The line continues above ground for the Yio Chu Kang and Ang Mo Kio stations, then it goes back to surface level for Bishan station, the MRT system's only at-grade station. A branch line to Bishan Depot exists between the Ang Mo Kio and Bishan stations. After Bishan, the line goes underground through the Central Area. The North–South Line runs parallel to the East–West Line at the City Hall and Raffles Place stations, which are also cross-platform interchanges to the East–West Line. The line ends at Marina South Pier station.

=== Stations ===
The line serves 27 MRT stations across 45 kilometres (28 mi) of track, and station codes for the line are red, corresponding to the line's colour on the system map. 11 stations, from Braddell to Marina South Pier are underground, with the rest being ground-level or elevated. With the exception of Bishan, Braddell and Canberra stations, the other stations have island platforms.

North–South Line Stations Timeline
Date	Project	Description
7 November 1987	Phase 1	Yio Chu Kang – Toa Payoh
12 December 1987	Phase 1	Toa Payoh – Outram Park (Direct train service to Outram Park via Raffles Place)
12 March 1988	Phase 1A	Outram Park – Clementi (Now part of the East–West Line)
5 November 1988	Phase 1B	Clementi – Lakeside (Now part of the East–West Line)
20 December 1988	Phase 1B	Yio Chu Kang – Yishun
4 November 1989	Phase 2A	Raffles Place – Marina Bay (Separation of the North–South Line & East–West Line)
10 March 1990	Phase 2B	Jurong East – Choa Chu Kang (Operates as a branch line from Jurong East)
10 February 1996	Woodlands Extension	Choa Chu Kang – Yishun
23 November 2014	North–South Line Extension	Marina Bay – Marina South Pier
2 November 2019	Canberra station	Canberra station between Sembawang and Yishun
2034	Future infill stations between existing stations	Brickland station between Bukit Gombak and Choa Chu Kang
2035	Future infill stations between existing stations	Sungei Kadut station between Yew Tee and Kranji

Legend

Elevated	Line terminus	Transfer outside paid area
Ground-level	Wheelchair accessible	Bus interchange
Underground	Civil Defence Shelter	Other transportation modes

List

Station code	Station name	Images	Interchange; Adjacent transportation	Opening	Cost
NS1 EW24 JE5	Jurong East		East–West Line; Jurong Region Line (East) (2028) ― Jurong East	5 November 1988; 38 years ago	S$5 billion
NS2	Bukit Batok		Bukit Batok	10 March 1990; 36 years ago	S$5 billion
NS3	Bukit Gombak		—	10 March 1990; 36 years ago	S$5 billion
NS3A	Brickland		—	2034; 8 years' time	S$281 million
NS4 BP1 JS1	Choa Chu Kang		Bukit Panjang LRT; Jurong Region Line (mid-2028) ― Choa Chu Kang	10 March 1990; 36 years ago	S$5 billion
NS5	Yew Tee		—	10 February 1996; 30 years ago	S$1.2 billion
NS6 DE2	Sungei Kadut		Downtown Line (2035)	2035; 9 years' time	S$450 million
NS7	Kranji		—	10 February 1996; 30 years ago	S$1.2 billion
NS8	Marsiling		—	10 February 1996; 30 years ago	S$1.2 billion
NS9 TE2	Woodlands		Thomson–East Coast Line ― Woodlands; Woodlands Temporary	10 February 1996; 30 years ago	S$1.2 billion
NS10	Admiralty		—	10 February 1996; 30 years ago	S$1.2 billion
NS11	Sembawang		Sembawang	10 February 1996; 30 years ago	S$1.2 billion
NS12	Canberra		—	2 November 2019; 7 years ago	S$274 million
NS13	Yishun		Yishun	20 December 1988; 37 years ago	S$5 billion
NS14	Khatib		—	20 December 1988; 37 years ago	S$5 billion
NS15	Yio Chu Kang		Yio Chu Kang	7 November 1987; 39 years ago	S$5 billion
NS16 CR11	Ang Mo Kio		Cross Island Line (2030) ― Ang Mo Kio	7 November 1987; 39 years ago	S$5 billion
NS17 CC15	Bishan		Circle Line ― Bishan	7 November 1987; 39 years ago	S$5 billion
NS18	Braddell		—	7 November 1987; 39 years ago	S$5 billion
NS19	Toa Payoh		Toa Payoh	7 November 1987; 39 years ago	S$5 billion
NS20	Novena		—	12 December 1987; 38 years ago	S$5 billion
NS21 – DT11	Newton		Downtown Line	12 December 1987; 38 years ago	S$5 billion
NS22 TE14	Orchard		Thomson–East Coast Line	12 December 1987; 38 years ago	S$5 billion
NS23	Somerset		—	12 December 1987; 38 years ago	S$5 billion
NS24 NE6 CC1	Dhoby Ghaut		North East Line; Circle Line	12 December 1987; 38 years ago	S$5 billion
NS25 EW13	City Hall		East–West Line	12 December 1987; 38 years ago	S$5 billion
NS26 EW14	Raffles Place		East–West Line	12 December 1987; 38 years ago	S$5 billion
NS27 CC33 TE20	Marina Bay		Circle Line; Thomson–East Coast Line	4 November 1989; 37 years ago	S$5 billion
NS28	Marina South Pier		Marina South Pier; Marina Bay Cruise Centre	23 November 2014; 12 years ago	S$357.5 million

=== Depots ===
Depot name; Lines	Location	Image	Line-specific stabling capacity	Cost	Opening
Bishan	Bishan		59 trains	S$300 million	7 November 1987; 39 years ago
Ulu Pandan; EWL	Jurong East		45 trains	S$130 million	12 March 1988; 38 years ago

== Infrastructure ==
=== Rolling stock ===
A variety of rolling stock on the North-South Line

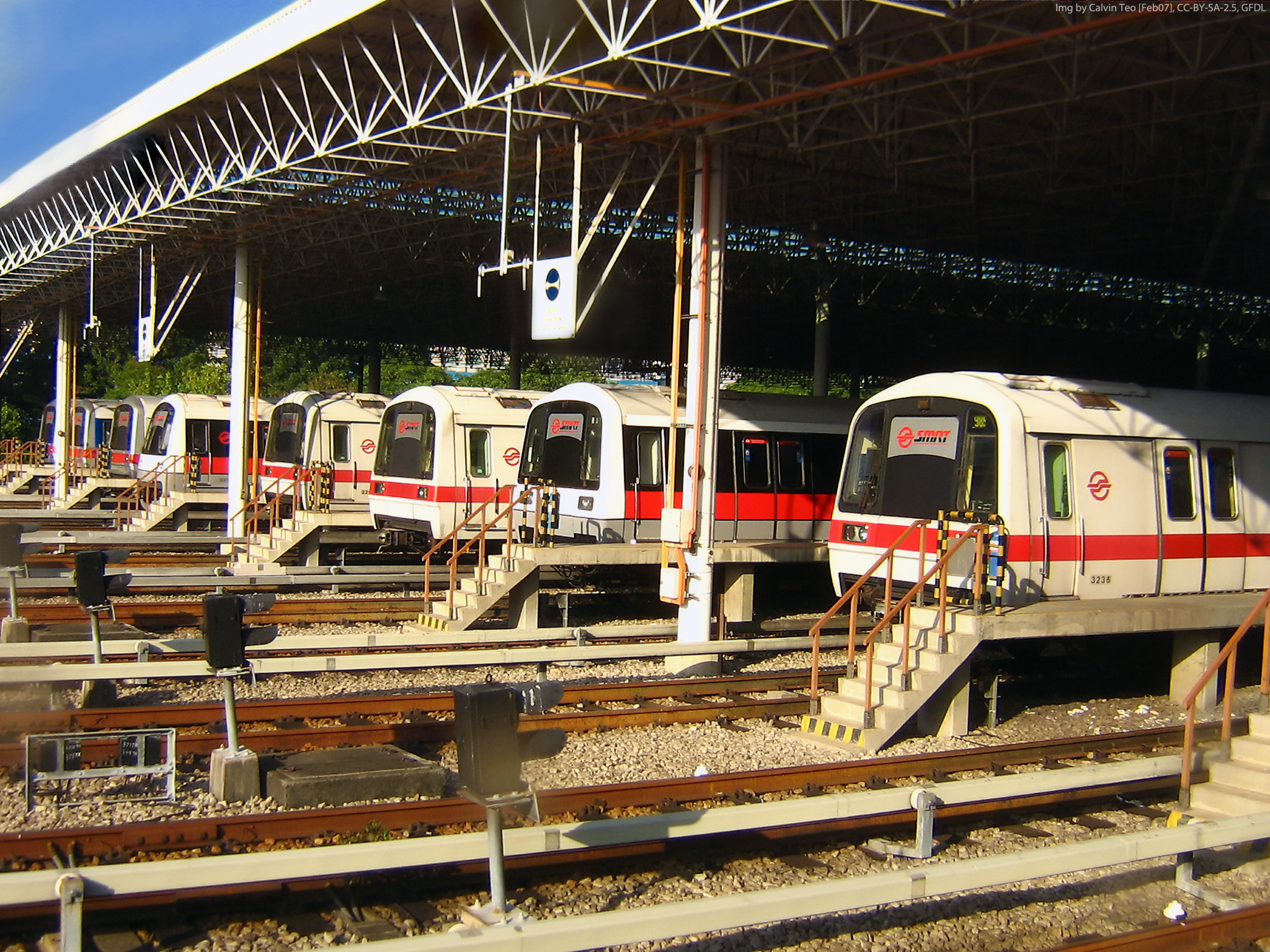
Various older-generation rolling stock of the North-South Line parked at Bishan Depot.

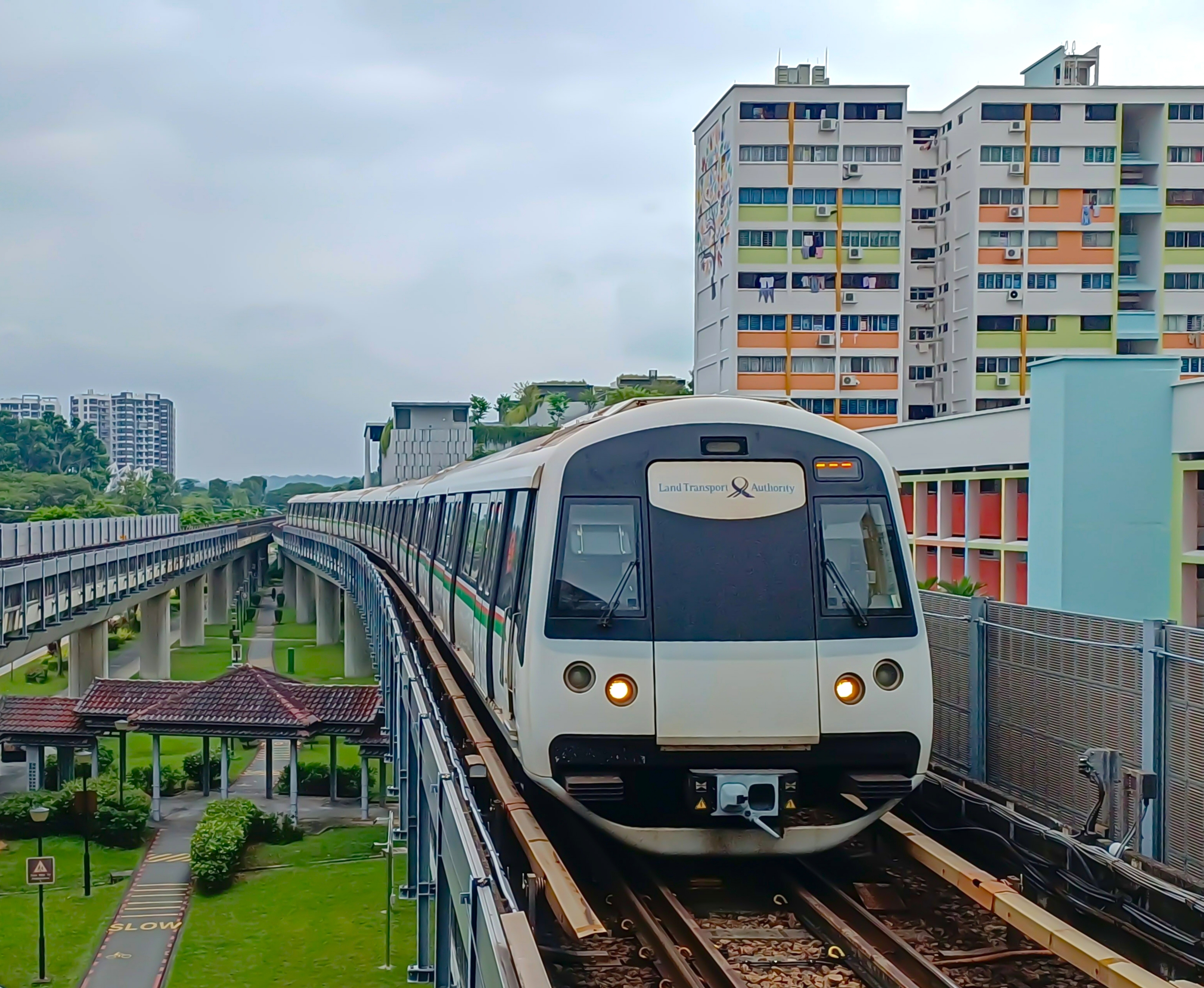
A newer rolling stock C151C

Electric Multiple Unit (EMU) trains on the North–South Line operate in a six-car formation, based out of Bishan Depot and Ulu Pandan Depot, which provide train maintenance, inspection and overhaul facilities. This rolling stock is shared with the East–West Line, with an electrification of 750 V DC powered by a third rail. With the exception of the R151 train, the current rolling stock was manufactured by Kawasaki Heavy Industries, in a joint venture with CRRC Qingdao Sifang for the subsequent rolling stocks of the C151A, C151B and C151C trains. When the initial line opened, the rolling stock of the North–South Line consisted of 66 first-generation C151 trains only. The 19 second-generation C651 trains were introduced during the Woodlands extension to complement the existing 66 first-generation C151 trains. The 21 third-generation C751B trains were introduced during the Changi Airport extension to complement the existing 66 first-generation C151 trains and 19 second-generation C651 trains. In 2011, the fourth-generation C151A trains were introduced, increasing the passenger capacity of both the North–South and East–West lines by 15%. The C151A trains were the first successful joint venture between Kawasaki Heavy Industries and CSR Qingdao Sifang in the international market.

As part of efforts to further increase passenger capacity on the line, newer C151B and C151C trains were subsequently delivered in 2017 and 2018 respectively. The introduction of the C151B trains saw the introduction of STARiS (SMRT Active Route Map Information System) 2.0, which is also seen in subsequent rolling stocks. The C151C trains are also the first MRT rolling stock on the NSEWL to be fitted with tip-up seats, in addition to the current features of the C151B trains.

Another generation of rolling stock, the R151 trains, will be delivered from 2022 to 2026, to replace all 66 first-generation C151 trains which were fully retired in 2025, as well as all 19 second-generation C651 and 21 third-generation C751B trains which were fully retired in 2024. The R151 trains will be the first rolling stock on the North–South Line to be manufactured by Bombardier Transportation (Bought by Alstom in 2021), which has also supplied trains for the Downtown Line.

=== Signalling ===
Initially, the North–South line used a semi-automatic signalling system consisting of the Westinghouse fixed block signalling system with automatic train control under automatic train operation Grades of Automation (GoA) 2. However, the ageing system had undermined the rail reliability on the line, requiring the NSL to upgrade its signalling system. Since 2019, the North–South Line is fully equipped with Thales SelTrac Communications-based train control moving block signalling system with automatic train control under automatic train operation (ATO) GoA 3. The subsystems consist of automatic train protection to govern train speed, NetTrac MT Automatic Train Supervision (ATS) to track and schedule trains and a Computer-based interlocking system that prevents incorrect signal and track points to be set.

A new moving-block signalling system, supplied by Thales, replaced the ageing fixed-block signalling system on the North–South Line. The upgrading works were completed in phases from 2016. With the upgraded signalling system, trains are now able to run closer to each other. The new system was tested on the evening of 28 March 2017. Train services were paused for ten minutes as the old signalling system was being changed to the new system. From 16 April 2017, the new system commenced full-day testing on Sundays for two months. The new C151B rolling stock were first introduced to the line on these testing days. Since 28 May 2017, the new signalling system has been operating full-day on the North–South Line. The old signalling system then ceased operations on 2 January 2019.

=== Platform screen doors ===
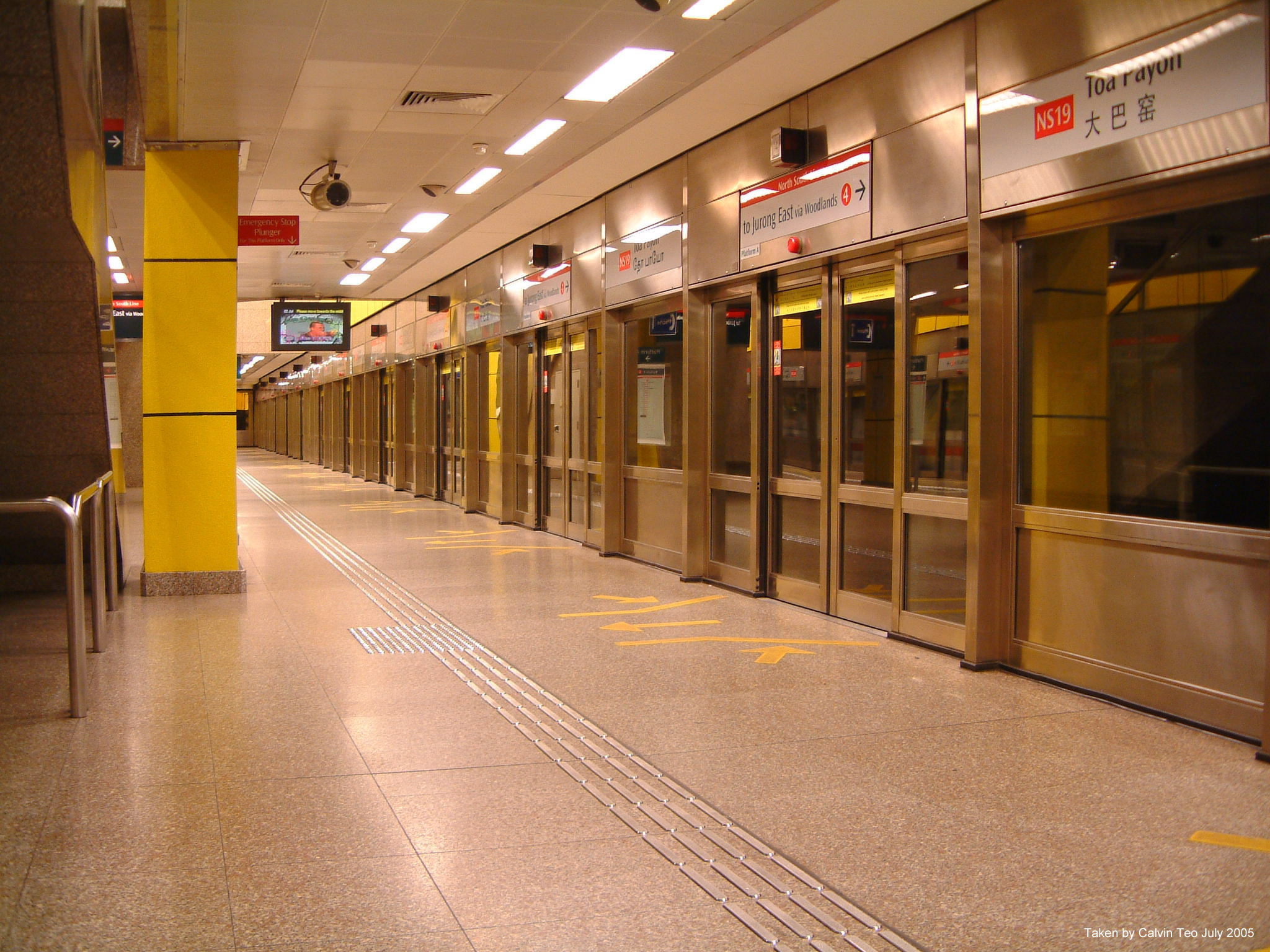
Full-height platform screen doors at Toa Payoh station.

When the line was first opened, full-height platform screen doors supplied by Westinghouse were installed at underground stations. These doors serve to prevent suicides, enable climate control within the station, better security control by restricting access to the tunnels and tracks and for overall passenger safety considerations. The authorities initially rejected calls for platform screen doors to be installed at elevated stations by casting doubts over functionality and concerns about the high installation costs. Nevertheless, the LTA reversed its decision and made plans to install half-height platform screen doors on elevated stations on 25 January 2008. The first platform screen doors by ST Electronics were installed at Pasir Ris, Jurong East and Yishun stations in 2009 as trial runs. Subsequently, installation began in May 2011 at Ang Mo Kio station. On 14 March 2012, platform screen doors became operational at all elevated stations on the North–South Line.

=== Rail ===
The NSL was built with wooden sleepers, which needed to be replaced when they neared the end of their lifespan of 15 to 25 years. The replacement sleepers, made out of concrete, have a significantly longer lifespan and enable smoother and safer rides. Since 2014, train services on the line have ended earlier for critical maintenance works, with the exception of a break between September 2016 and December 2016.

Trains on the NSL are powered via a third rail. However, constant contact between the train's Current Collector Devices (CCD) and the line saw the need for replacement works on the third rail, which were completed in August 2017. The new third rail replaced its 30-year-old predecessor, which was used since the opening of the line. The new electrical system is expected to make train services more reliable.
