= Bukit Gombak MRT station =

Mass Rapid Transit station in Singapore

Bukit Gombak NS3 武吉甘柏 புக்கிட் கோம்பாக்
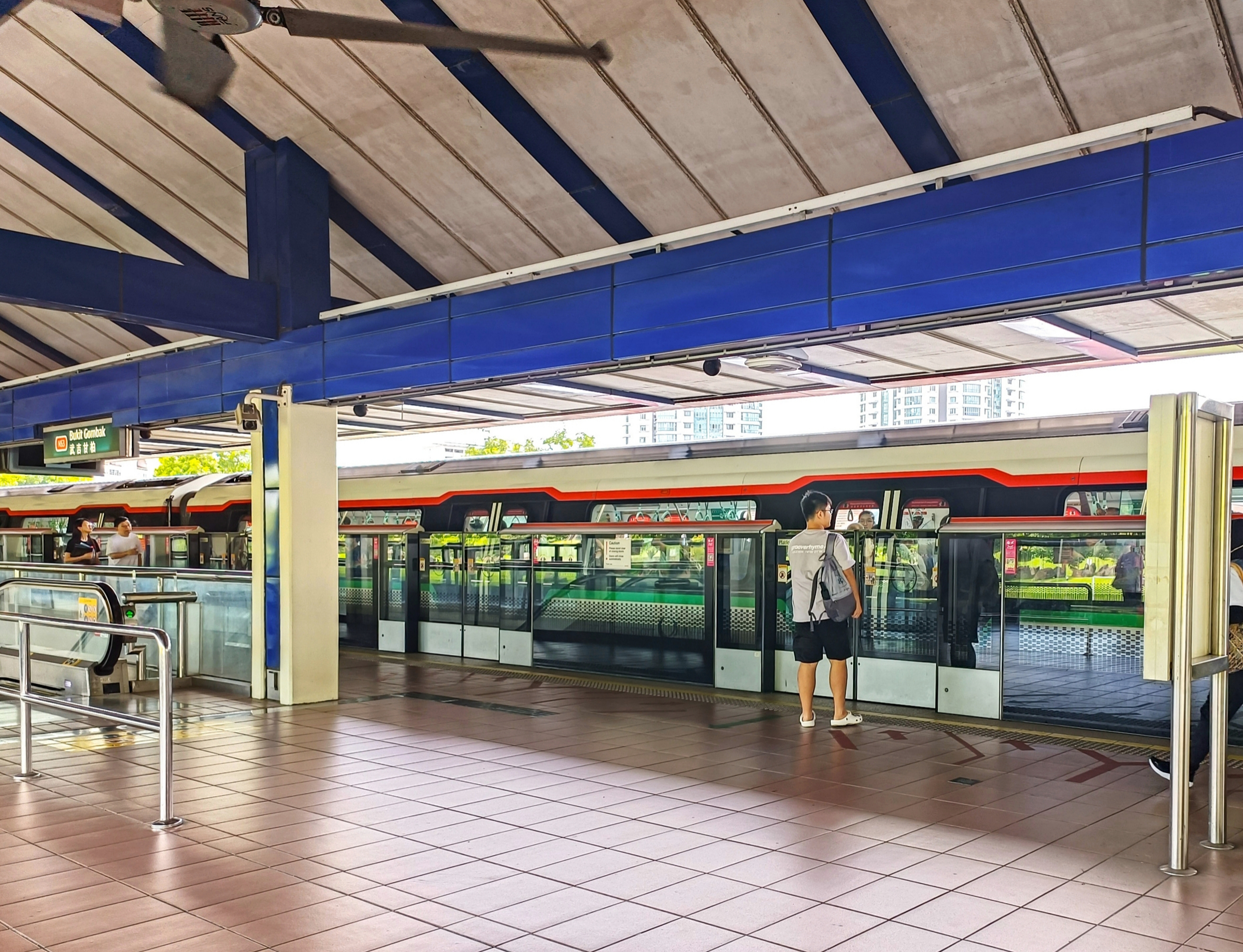
- Bukit Gombak Station Platform B

General information
- Location: 802 Bukit Batok West Avenue 5, Singapore 659083
- Coordinates: 01°21′31″N 103°45′06″E
- System: Mass Rapid Transit (MRT) station
- Owner: Land Transport Authority
- Operator: SMRT Trains
- Line: North–South Line
- Platforms: 2 (1 island platform)
- Tracks: 2
- Connections: Bus, Taxi

Construction
- Structure type: Elevated
- Platform levels: 1
- Accessible: Yes (only Exit D)

Other information
- Station code: BGB

History
- Opened: 10 March 1990; 36 years ago
- Former names: Bukit Batok North

Passengers
- June 2024: 18,519 per day

Services
Preceding station	Mass Rapid Transit	Following station
Bukit Batok towards Jurong East	North–South Line	Choa Chu Kang towards Marina South Pier
Bukit Batok towards Jurong East	North–South Line Future service	Brickland towards Marina South Pier
Former services
Preceding station	Mass Rapid Transit	Following station
Bukit Batok towards Jurong East	Branch Line	Choa Chu Kang Terminus
Track layout
Location
- Location within Singapore Rail

Bukit Gombak MRT station is an above-ground Mass Rapid Transit (MRT) station on the North–South Line (NSL) in Bukit Gombak, Singapore. Operated by SMRT, the station serves various landmarks such as Bukit Batok Town Park, Bukit Gombak Stadium, and Bukit Gombak Sports Hall. It has an inverted V-shaped roof and a blue colour scheme, similar to other stations in the former Branch Line stretch. Bukit Gombak is partially wheelchair accessible.

First announced in May 1982 as Bukit Batok North, it was later announced in October 1983 to be part of Phase IIB of the MRT system and opened on 10 March 1990. Initially served by the Branch Line, it was merged with the NSL in February 1996. Half-height platform screen doors and high-volume low-speed fans were installed by August 2011 and the first quarter of 2013, respectively.

== History ==
Bukit Gombak station was first included in the early plans of the Mass Rapid Transit (MRT) system as Bukit Batok North in May 1982. It was later revealed in October 1983 to be part of Phase IIB of the initial system by the Mass Rapid Transit Corporation (MRTC).

By August 1985, 14 out of 42 tenderers applied were prequalified by the MRTC for Contract 405, which outlined the construction of Bukit Gombak, Bukit Batok, and Bukit Panjang stations as well as the 6 kilometres (3.7 mi) track from Jurong to Bukit Panjang. A joint venture between Taiwanese company RSEA International and local company Hock Lian Seng Engineering Pte Ltd was announced in January 1986 to build the Jurong-Bukit Panjang stretch, also known as the western branch line, with the subcontract for the supply of post-tension cables and pre-cast beams for the viaducts was awarded to Swiss-Singaporean company VSL Systems in July 1986.

By March 1989, a parliamentary question session revealed that the western branch line will start operating by the middle of next year, though in February 1990, it was announced by then-Minister for Communication and Information Yeo Ning Hong that the western branch line will start operating on 10 March. An open house was to be held on 4 March for residents to familiarise themselves with the layout of Branch Line stations. Bukit Gombak, along with other stations on the Branch Line, opened on 10 March 1990.

On 10 February 1996, Bukit Gombak along with other stations in the Branch Line were merged into the North–South Line (NSL) with the Woodlands extension. Following a rise in track intrusions as well as commuters slipping when rushing for the train, the Land Transport Authority and SMRT decided to install platform screen doors. Half-height platform screen doors were eventually installed and commenced operations at Bukit Batok station by August 2011. The station was installed with high-volume low-speed fans by the first quarter of 2013. Bukit Gombak was a temporary terminus for the NSL from 18 to 19 September 2010 during the Jurong East Modification Project for Jurong East station.

== Details ==
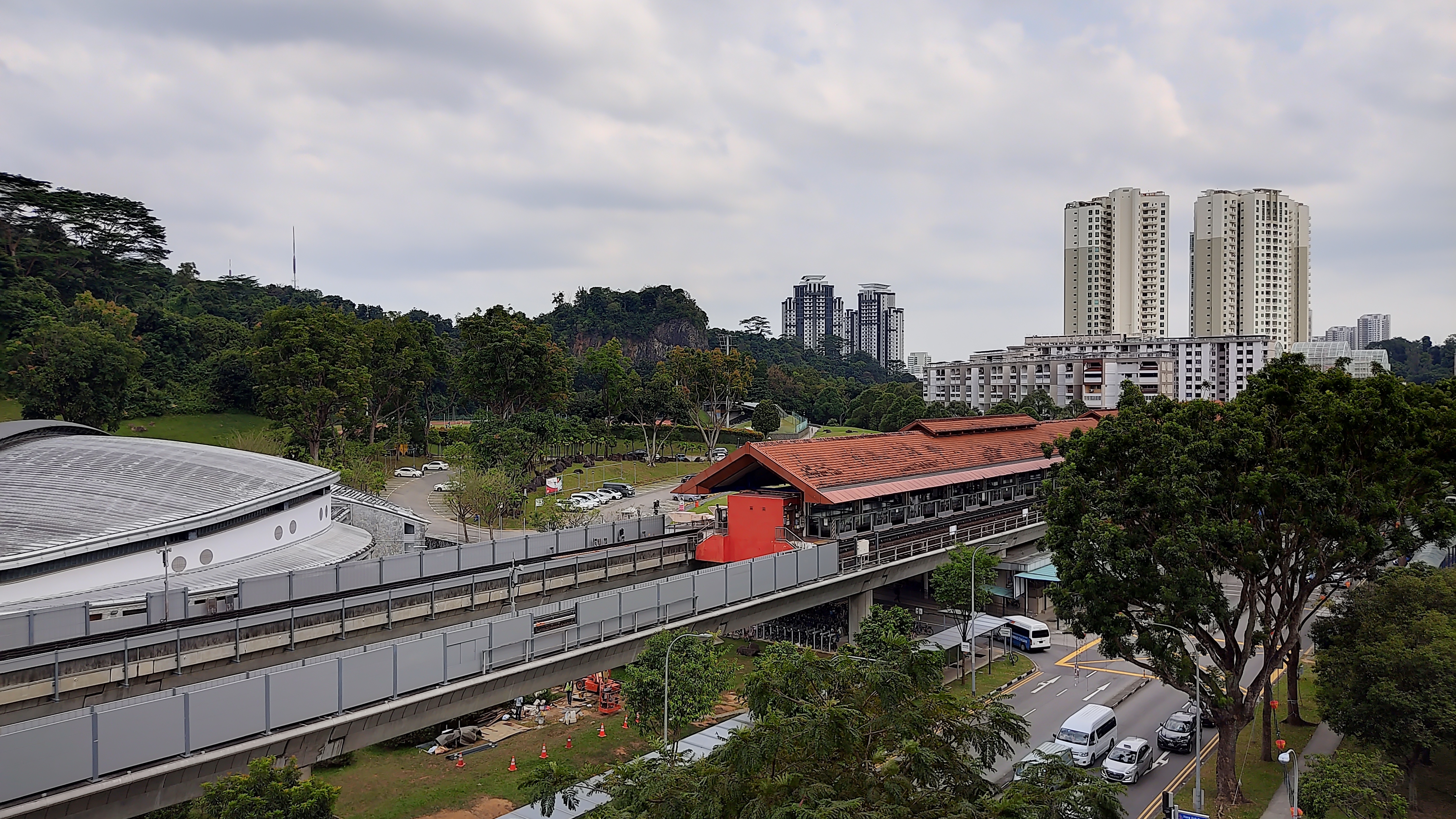
Roof of Bukit Gombak

Bukit Gombak station is on the NSL with the station number of NS3, situated between Bukit Batok and Choa Chu Kang stations. It initially had the station number of B2 when it was on the Branch line before being changed to its current station code in August 2001 as a part of a system-wide campaign to cater to the expanding MRT System. As a part of the NSL, the station is operated by SMRT Trains and just like many others stations on the initial MRT network, Bukit Gombak has an island platform and is elevated. The station operates between 5:21 am and 12:57 am daily, with train frequencies varying from 2–5 minutes during peak hours to an average of 5 minutes for off-peak hours. It is only wheelchair-accessible at Exit D and has bicycle facilities.

Bukit Gombak station is located in the town of Bukit Gombak, Singapore. It is near the junction of Bukit Batok West Avenue 5 and East Avenue 5 and has four exits serving various nearby landmarks such as the Bukit Gombak Sports Hall, Bukit Gombak Stadium, Bukit Batok Town Park (with Little Guilin), Hong Kah North Neighbourhood Police Post, and Dazhong Primary School. Like other stations in the former Branch Line as well as in Khatib and Yishun, it has an inverted, high-pitched V-shaped roof, reminiscent of the Housing and Development Board (HDB) logo since the station is located in a HDB estate. It also has brick walls on its exterior similar to nearby HDB blocks. Bukit Gombak has a blue colour scheme to distinguish itself from other stations within that branch.
