= Safety on the Mass Rapid Transit (Singapore) =

Safety concerns on Singaporean trains

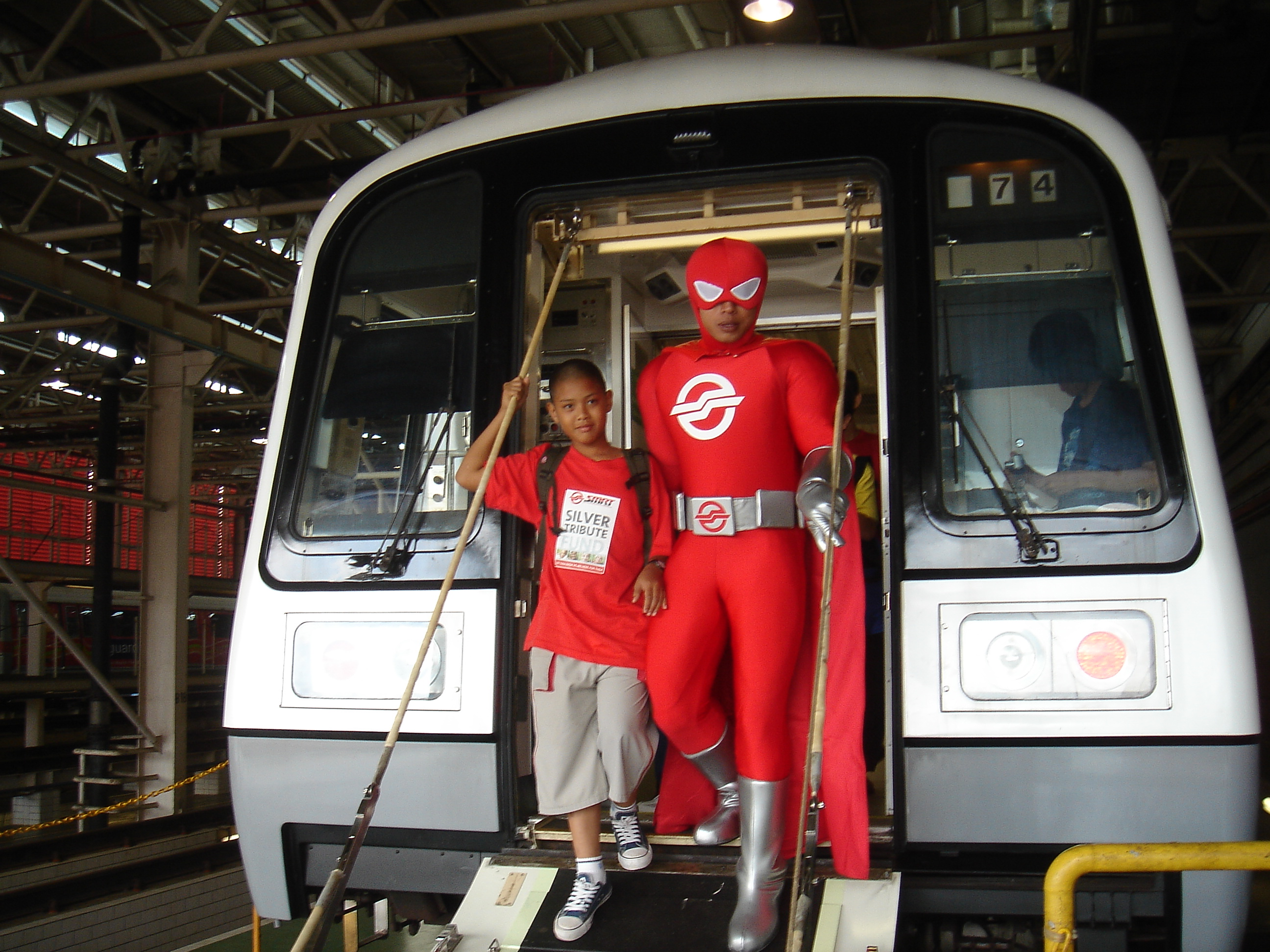
Captain SMRT demonstrating the use of a refurbished C151's emergency detrainment ramp.

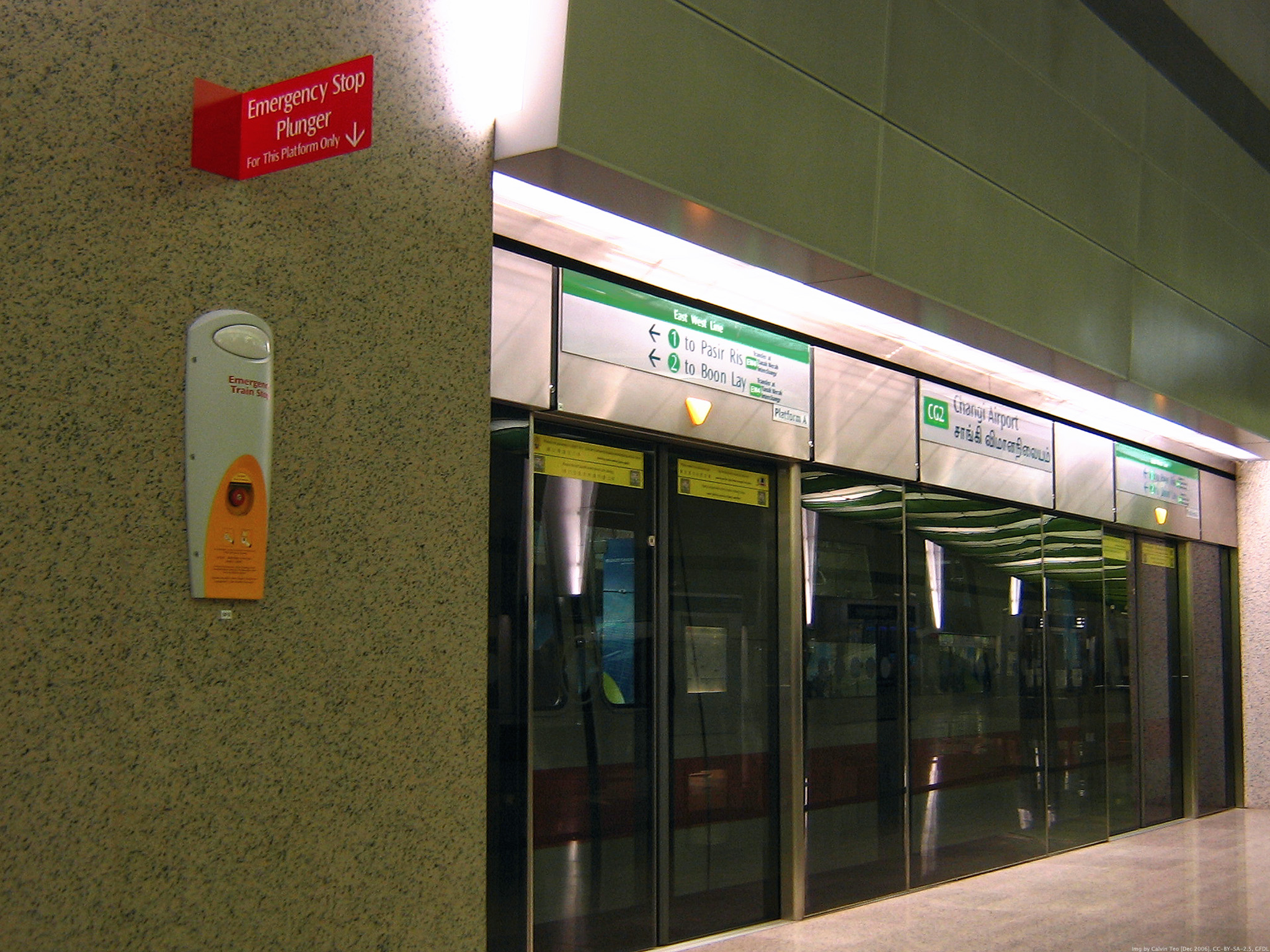
The Emergency Stop Plunger, found in all MRT stations, enables trains to be stopped before entering stations in case of an emergency.

The safety of the Mass Rapid Transit (MRT) system in Singapore was questioned by the public after several accidents on the system during the 1980s and 1990s. Most problems have been addressed, and many safety measures are visible to users of the system.

== Significant incidents ==
=== Clementi rail accident ===
On 5 August 1993 at 7:50 am, two C151 trains (051/052) & (121/122) collided with each other at Clementi, resulting in 132 injuries. The collision occurred because a work train that did maintenance work earlier that morning had spilled oil onto the tracks. One of the trains on that stretch of track that morning had been unable to brake in time because of the oil, resulting in a collision with a stationary train which was waiting to move off upon the recharging of its brakes.

=== Toa Payoh derailment ===
On 9 October 1997 at 2:00 am, a maintenance train derailed in the tunnel near Toa Payoh. The derailment occurred because a staff member had failed to reset the track alignment properly. Disruption to train services between Bishan & Newton lasted about 8 hours.

=== C651 door dislodging at City Hall ===
On 15 December 1997 at 5:14pm, a C651 train was undergoing modifications at Bishan Depot by Siemens before being deployed for the evening peak period. During this modification works one of the doors was not properly reinstalled, which resulted in that door getting dislodged while the train was approaching City Hall, smashing into one of the platform doors. Siemens was held liable in this incident.

=== Ang Mo Kio siding derailment ===
On 13 April 1999 at 10:00am, an off service C651 train on its way back to Bishan Depot after the morning peak service derailed between Yio Chu Kang and Ang Mo Kio stations. The derailment occurred because the station master had set only two of the three crossover points for the train. Disruption to train services lasted about 7 hours.

=== Nicoll Highway collapse ===
A construction accident occurred at approximately 3:30 pm on 20 April 2004 in Singapore when a Circle Line tunnel being constructed near Nicoll Highway station collapsed. The supporting structure for the deep excavation work failed, resulting in a 30-metre (100 ft) deep cave-in that spread across six lanes of Nicoll Highway.

The collapse killed four people and injured three. The accident delayed the construction end date for the MRT station. The accident left a collapse zone 150 m wide, 100 m long, and 30 m deep. Steel beams were twisted, with two construction cranes being swallowed up. A substantial chunk of the main highway running over the tunnel was also knocked out.

The rescue efforts were called off on 23 April 2004 because of the low chance of survival by that point, as well as danger to the rescue teams. Construction foreman Heng Yeow Pheow's body was never found. There was also the increasing need to stabilize the ground around the accident site to reduce the risk of further collapses. All six lanes of the Nicoll Highway were heavily damaged, rendering the road unusable. The highway re-opened on 4 December 2004 after reconstruction efforts.

A committee of inquiry found main contractor Nishimatsu Construction Company (ja:西松建設) and its officers as well as Land Transport Authority officers responsible for the collapse. Several other officers and subcontractors were reprimanded and issued warnings in connection with the accident. As a result of the accident, Stages 1 and 2 of the Circle Line were delayed. Stage 3 of the line, Bartley to Marymount stations opened first on 28 May 2009. The partially built station structure was abandoned, and the affected station has been shifted about 100 metres (330 ft) away from the accident site. Eventually, Nicoll Highway station started operations on 17 April 2010.

=== North-South Line incident ===
In 2011, a series of breakdowns occurred on the North-South Line (NSL). From 15 December to the morning of 17 December, stranded over 200,000 commuters, led to a public outcry, and remain some of the worst disruptions in the history of the MRT.

=== Pasir Ris rail accident ===
On 22 March 2016, 2 SMRT maintenance trainees who were part of a group of 15 tasked to investigate a possible signalling system fault near the tracks of Pasir Ris Station were run over by a Kawasaki Heavy Industries C151 at around 11:10 am, killing them. The incident took place 150m away from the station. This led to a 2.5 hour disruption from 11:10 am to 1:56 pm from Pasir Ris and Tanah Merah, and affected at least 10,000 commuters.

=== Bishan tunnel flooding ===
On 7 October 2017, train services were disrupted between Ang Mo Kio and Marina South Pier after the tunnels between Bishan and Braddell flooded after a heavy downpour in the afternoon and a small fire was spotted between Raffles Place and Marina Bay. Train services between Marina South Pier and Newton resumed at 9:20 pm on the day itself. However, train services between Ang Mo Kio and Newton were only restored around 2 pm the next day, after nearly 21 hours since service was stopped, making this one of the worst disruptions in SMRT's history. The cause of the disruption was a faulty water pump that failed to pump out water from the collection pools in the tunnel.

=== Joo Koon rail accident ===
On 15 November 2017 at 8:20 am, two trains collided at Joo Koon MRT station, injuring 36 passengers and 2 SMRT staff.

=== Clementi Derailment ===
On 25 September 2024, a KHI C151 train (065/066) derailed while being withdrawn from service into Ulu Pandan Depot after a defective train axle box on train-car 2065 dislodged and caused the wheels of a bogie to come off the running rail and hit track equipment, including the third rail and point machines, significantly damaging them and causing a power fault. Equipment damaged includes one train set, 1.6 km of running rails, power third rails and 3 track point switches. Recovery lasted 6 days, with service restored on the 1st of October, making this incident the longest breakdown in Singapore history.

== Safety ==
A number of emergency facilities are available in MRT stations, such as emergency stop plungers to stop trains approaching or at the station, and emergency telephones. Emergency communication buttons in trains allow communication with MRT staff, and emergency detrainment ramps at both ends of the trains allow for evacuation to the track or tunnel. Closed Circuit Televisions (CCTV) are installed in all MRT stations and onboard trains.

Several incidents have prompted a response from authorities to enhance safety features. For instance, an accident involving a student at Ang Mo Kio MRT station prompted earlier installation of half-height platform screen doors at that station, although full installation was delayed until December. Gap fillers are installed on all underground MRT stations and trains on the Downtown Line. Following a number of incidents where passenger were trapped in the gap created between the platform gates and the train, they have also been installed on new trains on the Circle and North East lines. Platform screen door designs on the North–South and East–West lines' older stations, however, prohibit the installation of such gap fillers. All stations are built to be as straight as possible to minimise the gap between the platform and the train.

Escalator safety is a general concern in Singapore, with almost one accident occurring every day. Escalators at MRT stations usually operate at 0.75m per second, in order to move crowds at a faster rate. Refurbishments are ongoing for those on the North–South and East–West lines to allow escalators to run at dual speeds of 0.5m during non-peak hours and 0.75m during peak hours. Escalators on the Thomson–East Coast Line are designed to operate in this manner. The scheme is expected to be gradually expanded to the Circle, North East, and Downtown lines. Slowing the speeds of escalators is meant to improve the safety of the elderly and young children. Additional features of the refurbished escalators include indicator lights to show the direction the escalator is moving, skirt deflectors to move people away from standing too close to the edges of the escalator, and a system to prevent escalator operation if the handrail speed is not synchronised with the speed of the escalator steps.

=== Fire safety ===
After the Daegu subway fire incident in South Korea, fire prevention became an important consideration of the Mass Rapid Transit system of Singapore. MRT fire prevention standards are adapted from the guidelines of the American National Fire Prevention Authorities (NFPA), which were established for enhancing fire safety within metro systems. Underground stations and tunnels have smoke extraction and tunnel ventilation fans to expel smoke and supply fresh air in case of a fire. All MRT trains are built to strict safety standards, with materials that are fire-retardant, while attempting to limit toxicity. Trains are also installed with fire and smoke detection systems, as well as two fire extinguishers in each train. Emergency readiness drills are conducted by the LTA to test the operators' responsiveness to fire incidents.

=== Platform screen doors and gates ===
The Singapore Mass Rapid Transit (MRT) was the first rapid transit system in Asia to incorporate glass platform screen doors, in its underground stations in 1987. These platform doors cost S$1 million per platform. Full height PSDs mainly manufactured by Westinghouse are installed at all existing underground MRT and sub-surface stations in Singapore. Future underground MRT stations will also have full-height doors installed upon opening. Half-height platform screen doors mostly manufactured by ST Electronics have been retrofitted into all elevated stations by March 2012 (starting with three elevated MRT stations in 2009), as well as all future elevated MRT stations.

There are two series of the full-height platform screen doors in use. The first series, made by Westinghouse, was installed at all underground stations along the North–South Line and the East–West Line from 1987 to the completion of the initial system in 1990. The second series of PSDs sport a sleeker design, producing less sound when the doors were opened and closed while incorporating more glass. The first station with these doors was Changi Airport MRT station which opened in 2002. All stations in the fully underground North East Line and Circle Line, which opened in 2003 and 2009 respectively, sport these new doors, also made by Westinghouse, although there are slight differences in their designs. The same doors used in the Circle Line also equip the rebuilt North–South Line platforms at Bishan MRT station in 2009 following renovations in conjunction with the Circle Line interchange at the station. The Downtown Line features Westinghouse doors of a still-newer design, which is also found in Marina South Pier MRT station which opened in 2014. The Thomson–East Coast Line uses full-height doors by a different manufacturer, Alstom, in its stations.

Considered a novelty at the time of its installation, platform screen doors were introduced primarily to minimise hefty air-conditioning costs, especially since elevated stations are not air-conditioned and are much more economical to run in comparison. Since then the safety aspects of these doors have become more important, as highlighted by a series of high-profile incidents where individuals were injured or killed by oncoming trains since the year 2002—all occurring on elevated stations with no screen doors. Intrusions onto the tracks at elevated stations have fallen since the installation of half-height platform screen doors.

Initially, all elevated stations did not have half-height platform screen doors (HHPSDs) installed. The government had not supported the retrofitting of these gates at elevated platforms due to prohibitively high costs. Costs have since fallen due to the popularity of such gates worldwide, making such a project now feasible, and in a speech by the Minister for Transport Raymond Lim on 25 January 2008, the government announced plans for the retrofitting of HHPSDs on platforms at all elevated stations by 2012.

Pasir Ris was the first elevated station to have platform screen gates and Kranji was the last elevated station to have platform screen gates. By 2011, all elevated East–West Line stations have the platform screen doors installed and by 2012, all elevated North–South Line stations have the platform screen doors installed. HHPSDs installed through this period were installed by ST Electronics. Newer half-height platform screen doors on the Tuas West Extension which opened in 2017 were installed by Fangda of China. All platform screen doors of both types on the MRT system have emergency door handles.

Type	Generation	Image	Manufacturer	Year Introduced	Routes operated	Variations
Full-height	1st		Westinghouse	1987	North–South Line; East–West Line; Underground stations built before 1990	
Full-height	2nd		Westinghouse	2002	East–West Line (Changi Airport); North East Line	North East Line Variation
Full-height	3rd		Westinghouse	2008	North–South Line (Bishan); Circle Line	Circle Line Variation
Half-height	1st		ST Electronics; Westinghouse	2009	North–South Line; East–West Line; Elevated stations built before 2012	
Full-height	4th		Siemens (formerly Invensys Westinghouse); Faiveley Transport (Note: Manufacturer)	2013	Downtown Line; North–South Line (Marina South Pier)	Downtown Line Variation
Half-height	2nd		Fangda Intelligent Innovation Technology	2017	East–West Line (Tuas West Extension)	Tuas West Extension Variation
Half-height	3rd		ST Electronics	2019	North–South Line (Canberra)	Canberra Variation
Full-height	5th		Alstom (formerly GE Transportation); ST Electronics	2020	Thomson–East Coast Line	
