= Siemens C651 =

Class of electric multiple units in Singapore

Siemens AG (SIE) C651
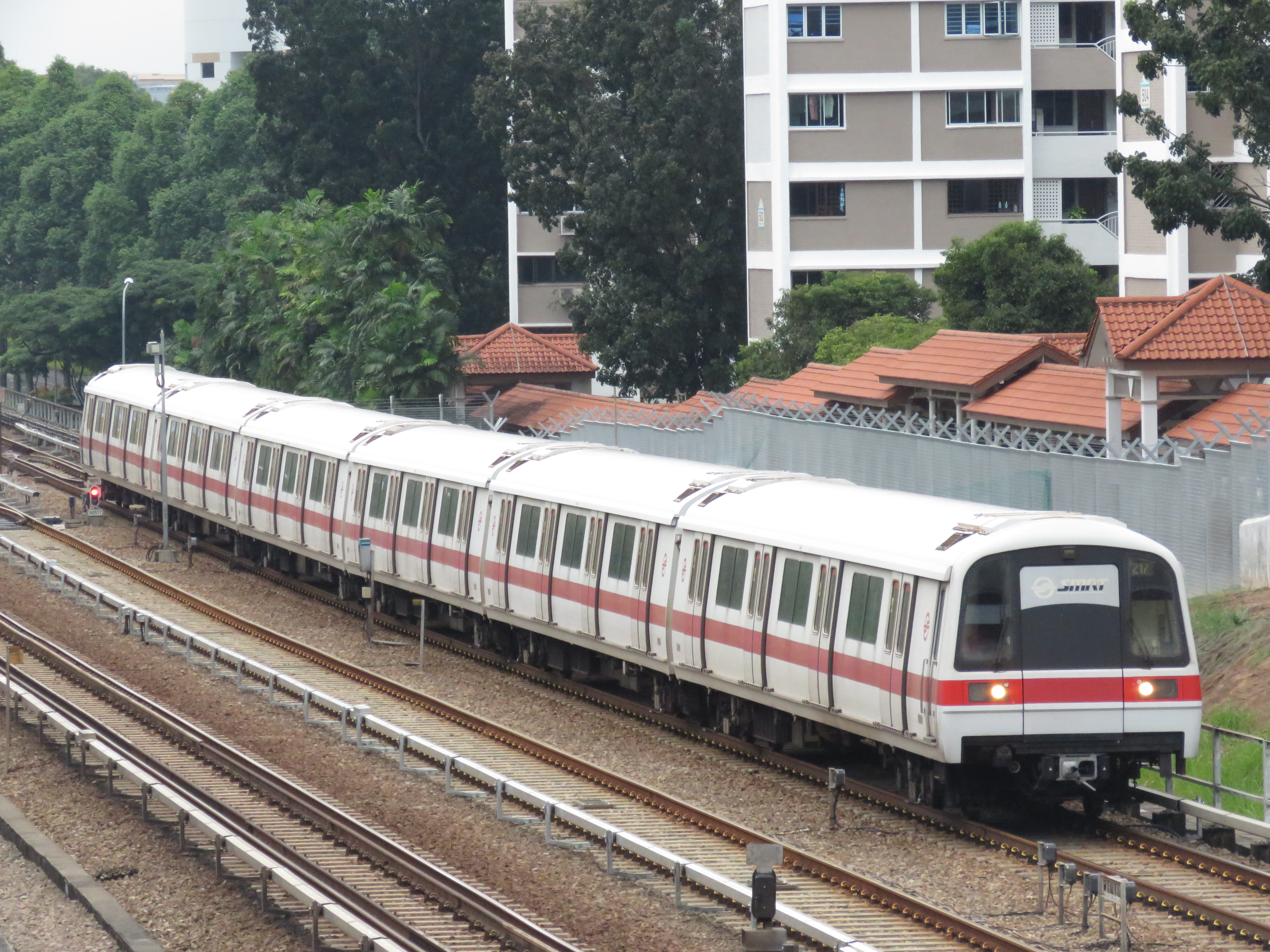
- A Siemens C651 train.

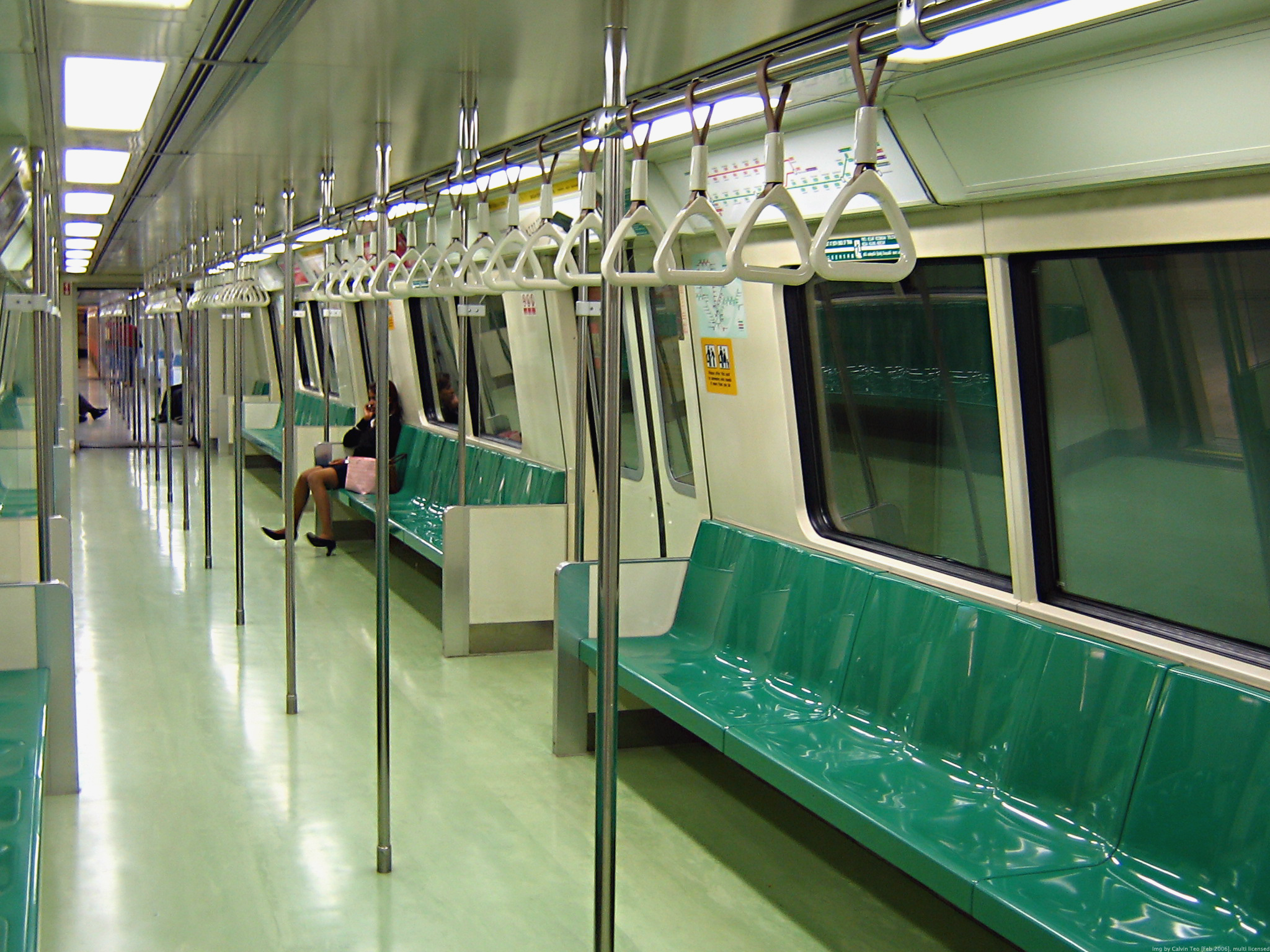
- Interior of a Siemens C651 train
- Stock type: Electric multiple unit
- In service: 2 May 1995 – 30 September 2024 (29 years, 151 days)
- Manufacturers: Siemens Mobility, SGP Verkehrstechnik
- Assembly: Vienna, Austria
- Constructed: 1994 – 1995
- Entered service: 2 May 1995; 31 years ago
- Refurbished: Singapore Rail Engineering (SRE); 2016 – 2018 (Note: Cancelled as of September 2018)
- Retired: 4 October 2024; 2 years ago
- Number built: 114 vehicles (19 sets)
- Number preserved: 6 vehicles
- Number scrapped: 108 vehicles
- Successor: Alstom Movia R151
- Formation: 6 per set DT–M1–M2+M2–M1–DT
- Fleet numbers: 201/202 – 237/238
- Capacity: 1920 passengers; 372 seats (as built); 368 seats (CBTC Box installation); 272 seats (201/202, 209/210, PR 217/218, PR 227/228, 235/236); 362 seats (237/338)
- Operator: SMRT Trains Ltd (SMRT Corporation)
- Depots: Bishan; Ulu Pandan; Tuas; Changi
- Lines served: North–South Line; East–West Line

Specifications
- Car body construction: Aluminium-alloy
- Train length: 138.5 m (454 ft 4 3/4 in)
- Car length: 23.65 m (77 ft 7 in) (DT); 22.8 m (74 ft 10 in) (M)
- Width: 3.2 m (10 ft 6 in)
- Height: 3.7 m (12 ft 1 5/8 in)
- Doors: 1,450 mm (57 1/8 in), 8 per car, 4 per side
- Wheel diameter: 850–775 mm (33.5–30.5 in) (new–worn)
- Wheelbase: 2,500 mm (98 in)
- Maximum speed: 90 km/h (56 mph) (design); 80 km/h (50 mph) (service)
- Weight: 35 t (34 long tons; 39 short tons) (unladen); 53.8 t (53.0 long tons; 59.3 short tons) (laden)
- Axle load: 16 t (16 long tons; 18 short tons)
- Traction system: Siemens G750 D585/1060 M5-1 PWM GTO–VVVF inverter
- Traction motors: 16 × Siemens 140 kW (190 hp) 3-phase AC induction motors (with enclosed-ventilated lateral drive)
- Power output: 2.24 MW (3,000 hp)
- Transmission: 5.94 : 1 (107 / 18) gear ratio
- Acceleration: 1 m/s^{2} (3.3 ft/s^{2})
- Auxiliaries: 110 V DC
- Electric systems: 750 V DC third rail
- Current collection: Collector shoe
- UIC classification: 2′2′+Bo′Bo′+Bo′Bo′+Bo′Bo′+Bo′Bo′+2′2′
- Bogies: Duewag SF 2100
- Braking systems: 1st service brake: Self-excited, mixed service and resistor brake; 2nd service brake: Pneumatic compressed air wheel tyre block brake; Parking brake: Compressed air pressure spring-loaded brake
- Safety systems: Original: Westinghouse Brake and Signal Company FS2000 ATP fixed block ATC under ATO GoA 2 (STO), with subsystems of ATP and ATS; Current: Thales SelTrac® moving block CBTC ATC under ATO GoA 3 (DTO), with subsystems of ATP, NetTrac ATS and CBI
- Coupling system: Scharfenberg coupler
- Track gauge: 1,435 mm (4 ft 8 1/2 in) standard gauge

The Siemens C651 is a class of retired trains that were the second generation of electric multiple unit rolling stock that operated on the North–South and East–West lines of Singapore's Mass Rapid Transit (MRT) system, manufactured by Siemens Mobility and SGP Verkehrstechnik in Vienna, Austria. A total of 114 cars consisting of 19 sets were purchased in 1992 and were in service from May 1995 to September 2024.

== Design ==
=== Initial design ===
The trains had a full white body and a thick red stripe in the middle. Similar to the Kawasaki Heavy Industries C151 trains, the Siemens C651 trains had no visual passenger information systems but had a built-in audio announcement system until STARiS (SMRT Active Route Map Information System) was installed and activated around 2010.

Unlike the 66 first generation Kawasaki Heavy Industries C151 sets, the C651s were delivered with a scratch-resistant acrylic finish. This alleviated the difficulty of removing dirt trapped on the exterior surface, as opposed to the aluminium finish of the C151 trains that were delivered unpainted. The train run number at the front and rear of the train was delivered by a low-power consumption electronic green flip-dot display.

The C651 trains were originally delivered with a GTO-VVVF propulsion system that was manufactured by Siemens. The wailing noise produced by their traction inverters were often described as melodious.

Other original features included specifically designed air-conditioning vents that eliminate dripping from the cooling system to the train compartments, as well as an event recorder, which records important train functions, such as braking and emergency operations to assist troubleshooting in an event of a failure.

== Operational history ==
=== Tendering process ===
The design and supply of the C651 trains were tendered in December 1992 to complement the 66 first generation C151 trains with the opening of the Woodlands extension, at a cost of $259 million. These trains began revenue service from 2 May 1995, with the first train set delivered to the Mass Rapid Transit Corporation (MRTC) of Singapore on 20 September 1994.

=== Experimental programmes ===
A number of experimental programmes had been run on the C651 cars.

In the 2000s, the third and fourth cars, coloured in green had all but eight seats, four at each end of the car, removed completely. In its place was standing room with upholstered cushion, in an attempt to provide a degree of comfort to passengers standing in that space. This design proved to be unpopular with the commuters, and it was eventually dropped. The original seats between the 1st and 2nd door and the 3rd and 4th door on these cars have been replaced. The remaining upholstered seats were reverted to original seats in May 2006. All C651 trains have had their seats on the middle part of carriage removed.

Some sets were reconfigured to have more standing space in the late 1990s as part of an experimental programme. In particular, the second and fifth cars (the blue cars) were reconfigured to have more standing room on both sides of a seat row, as 3 seats from some later cars.

More grab poles were also added to some cars. Regular grab poles in the centre of each car were replaced by grab poles that branch out into three in the centre, first in 2007, followed by triplicated hand grips and grab poles in 2014. Special non-slip floorings were also tested.

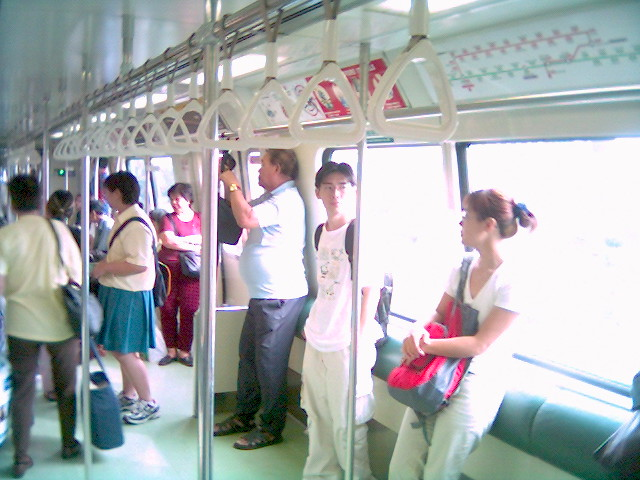
Upholstered cushions, part of an experimental program. They have since been replaced by original seats.

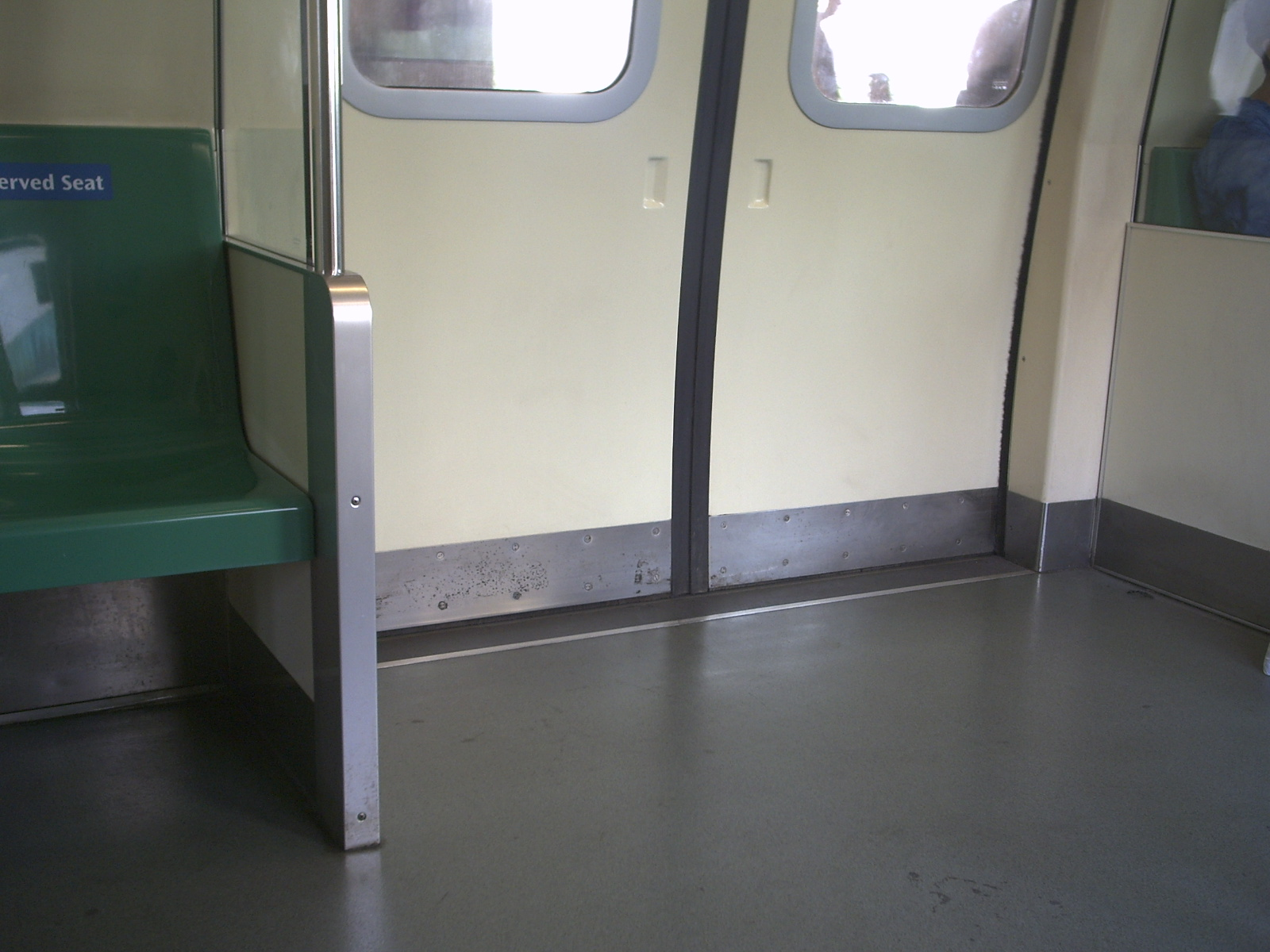
Modified flooring of some cars of C651 Set 237/238

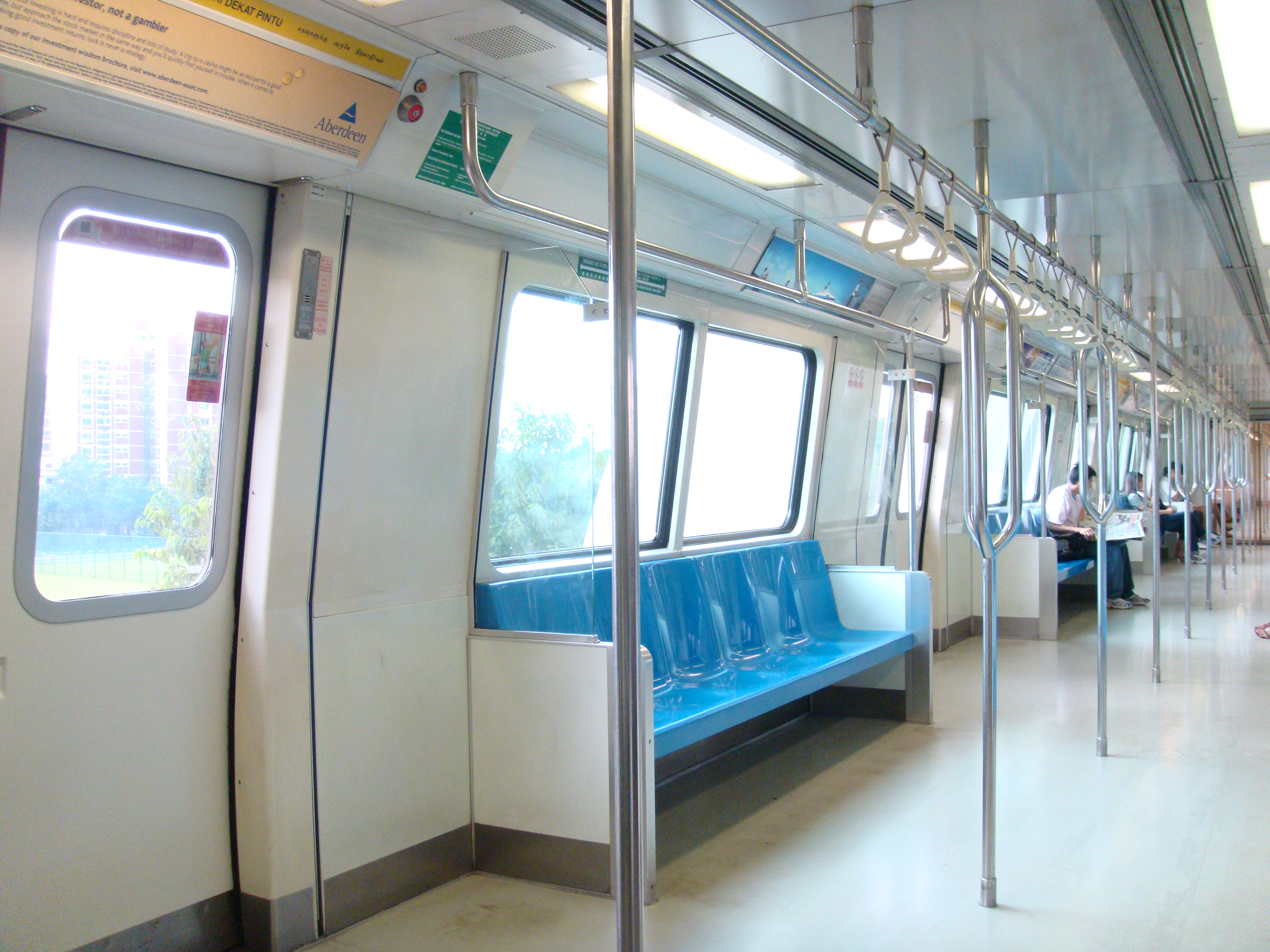
The interior of a Siemens C651 car. Modified grab poles and standing spaces, part of an experimental program, can be seen.

=== Cancelled refurbishment ===
In 2015, refurbishment contracts for all 19 C651 train sets were awarded to Singapore Rail Engineering (SRE). When completed, these upgrades would have addressed components such as doors and brakes that have been the primary cause of delays owing to train faults. The changes planned included re-signalling, refurbishing the propulsion system, air-conditioning system, auxiliary power system, interior saloon with modifying handrails, replacement of the gangway connections and improving the exterior of the trains. Upgraded trains would also have had sensors that carry vital information on the train's state of health for improved operation and maintenance of the train set.

Refurbishment works began in January 2016, starting with EMU 217/218. The refurbished trains would also have included dynamic route map displays running on STARiS 2.0 and the replacement of its propulsion system by Toshiba with Permanent Magnet Synchronous Motor (PMSM) similar to re-tractioned C151 trains. The refurbishment of all 19 C651 trains was projected to be completed by 2019.

In September 2018, SMRT announced that both the C651 refurbishment works and the C151 re-tractioning project had been prematurely terminated. At the time of project termination, refurbishment works had been conducted on the three prototype sets, with testing works incomplete.

=== Retirement and preservation ===
All C651 trains, together with the 21 C751B trains were completely decommissioned by the end of 2024, ahead of the decommissioning of the first-generation C151 trains. This was because the C651 and C751B fleets had a relatively low reliability and the fleet was also smaller compared to the C151 fleet.

In December 2019, Toyotron Pte Ltd was awarded the contract for disposal of old SMRT trains. On 6 September 2020, the first C651 train (set 203/204) was sent for scrap. On 28 September 2020, the LTA announced that a second batch of 40 new Alstom Movia R151 trains was ordered to replace all 19 Siemens C651 sets along with the 21 Kawasaki Heavy Industries & Nippon Sharyo C751B sets from 2025 onwards, on top of the initial order of 66 R151 trains to replace the 66 Kawasaki Heavy Industries C151 sets. In 2021, all three refurbished C651 sets (sets 217/218, 225/226 and 227/228) were scrapped without ever re-entering revenue service.

On 30 September 2024, the last two C651 trains in revenue service (sets 201/202 and 207/208) made their final runs on the North–South Line and East–West Line Changi Airport Branch respectively; they were sent to Tuas Depot to await scrapping on 4 October 2024, ending its 29 years of service. The C651 fleet was officially retired on 27 November 2024, with carriages of the last remaining C651 train (set 237/238) scrapped or preserved between 27–30 November 2024. This was also the first ever rolling stock model in Singapore's MRT system to be fully decommissioned from service.

Notable trains that were preserved include one donated to the Singapore Police Force for training purposes in August 2021, and at the National Museum where parts from a train such as train doors, seats and map displays have been preserved since July 2024 for future exhibitions.

== Major incidents ==
The C651 was involved in the following incidents during its service:

- C651 Door Dislodged: On 15 December 1997, at around 4:15pm, a C651 set was undergoing modifications at Bishan Depot by Siemens before being deployed for the evening peak period. One of the doors was not properly reinstalled during the modification works, which resulted in the door getting dislodged while the train was approaching City Hall Station and at the same time smashing one of the platform screen doors. Siemens was held liable in this incident.
- Ang Mo Kio Siding Derailment: On 13 April 1999, at around 10:00 am, an off-service C651 (set 227/228) was on its way back to Bishan Depot after running during the morning peak period. It derailed between Yio Chu Kang and Ang Mo Kio stations. The derailment occurred because the station master had failed to reset the track alignment properly. Disruption to train services lasted about 7 hours.
