= Kawasaki Heavy Industries C151 =

Passenger rail cars in Singapore

Kawasaki Heavy Industries (KHI) C151
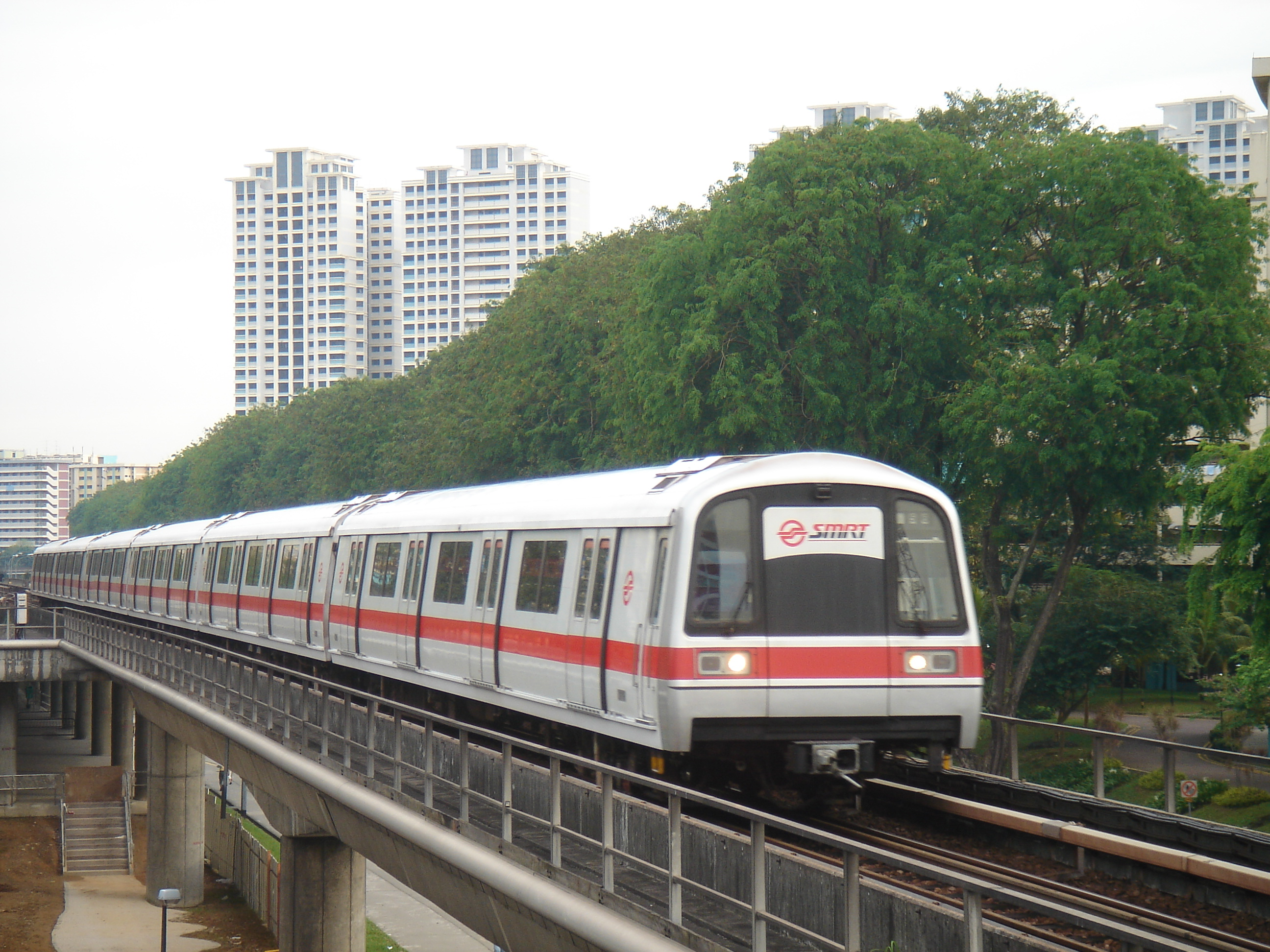
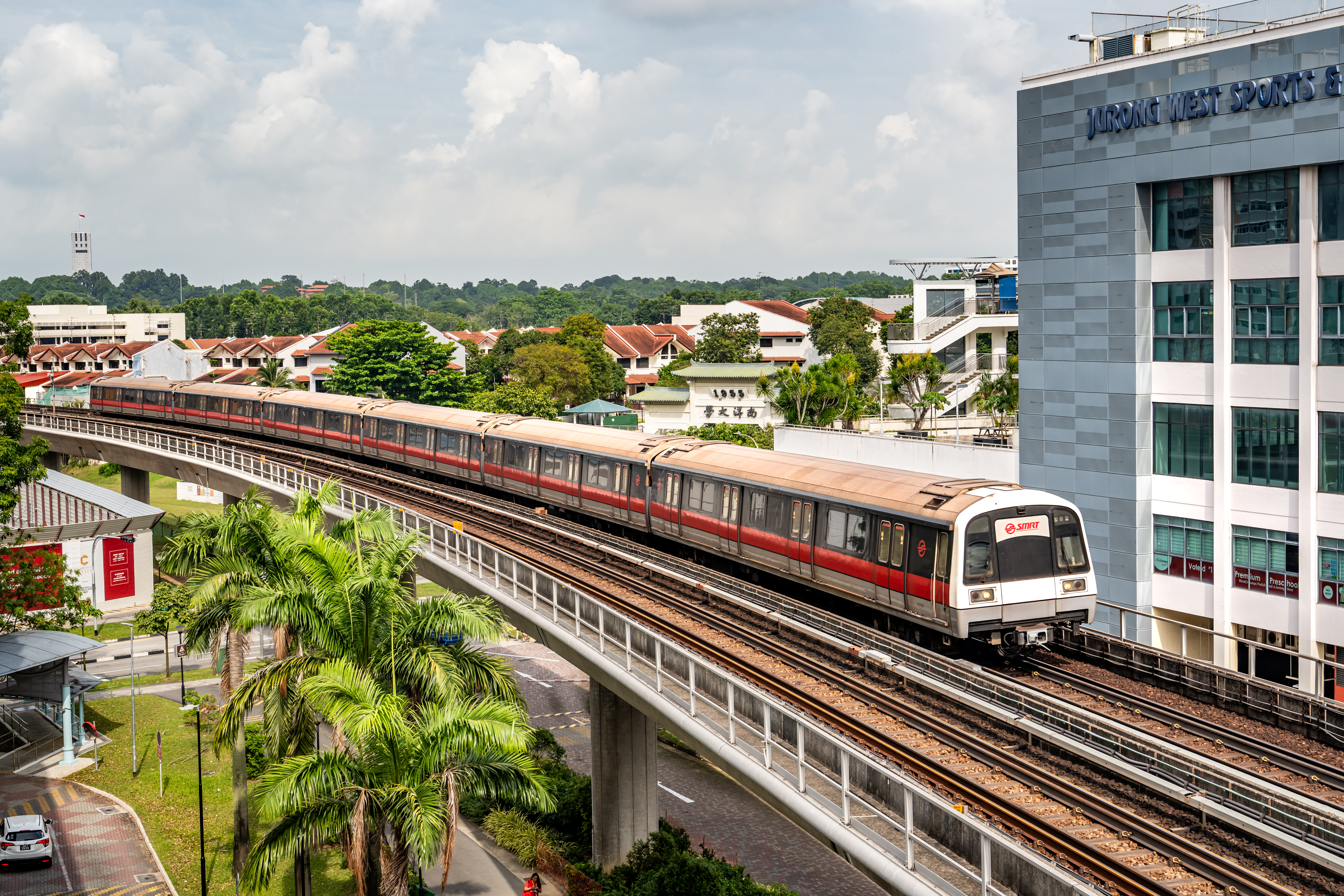
- A Kawasaki C151 train before refurbishment A refurbished Kawasaki C151 train

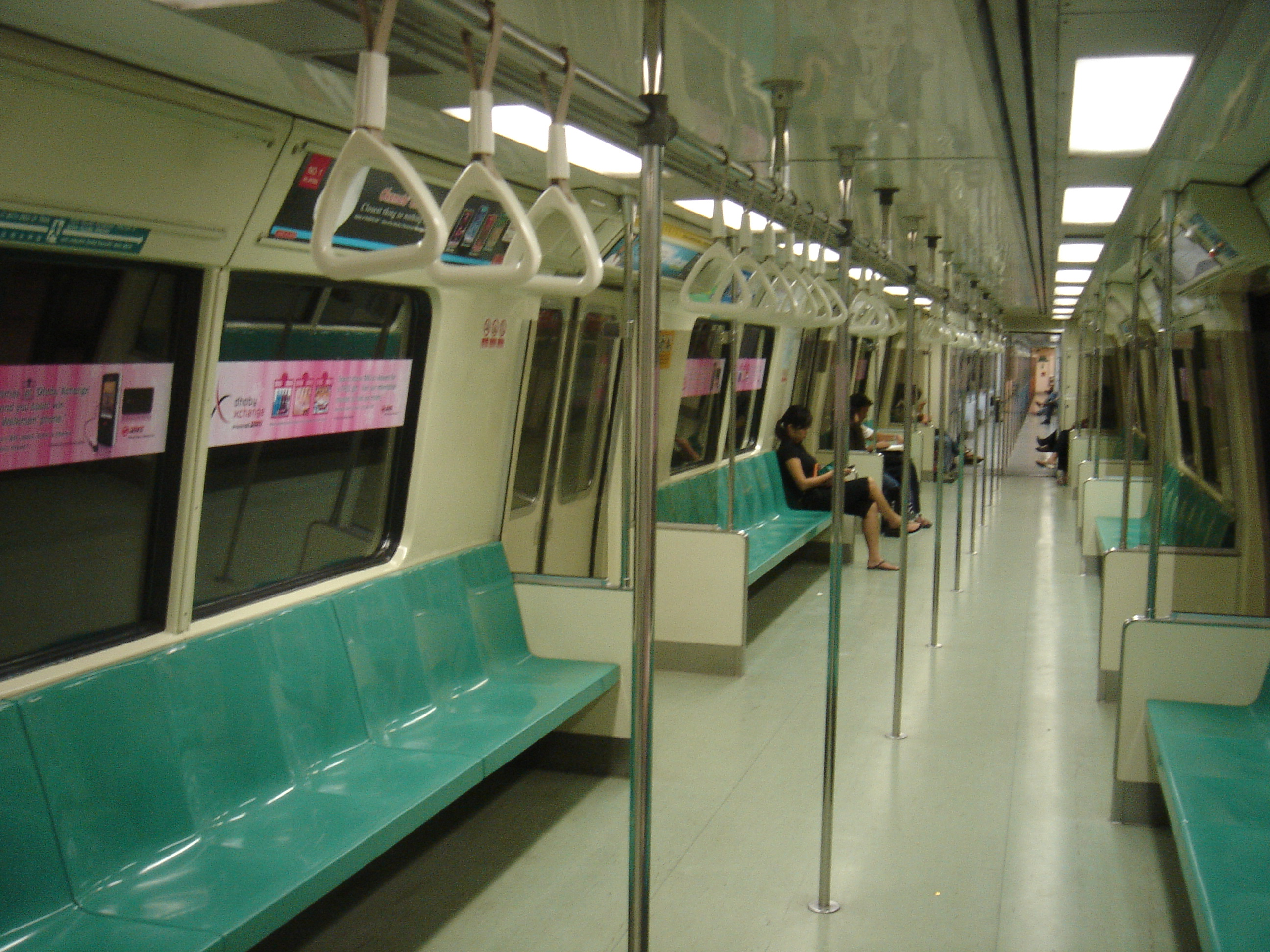
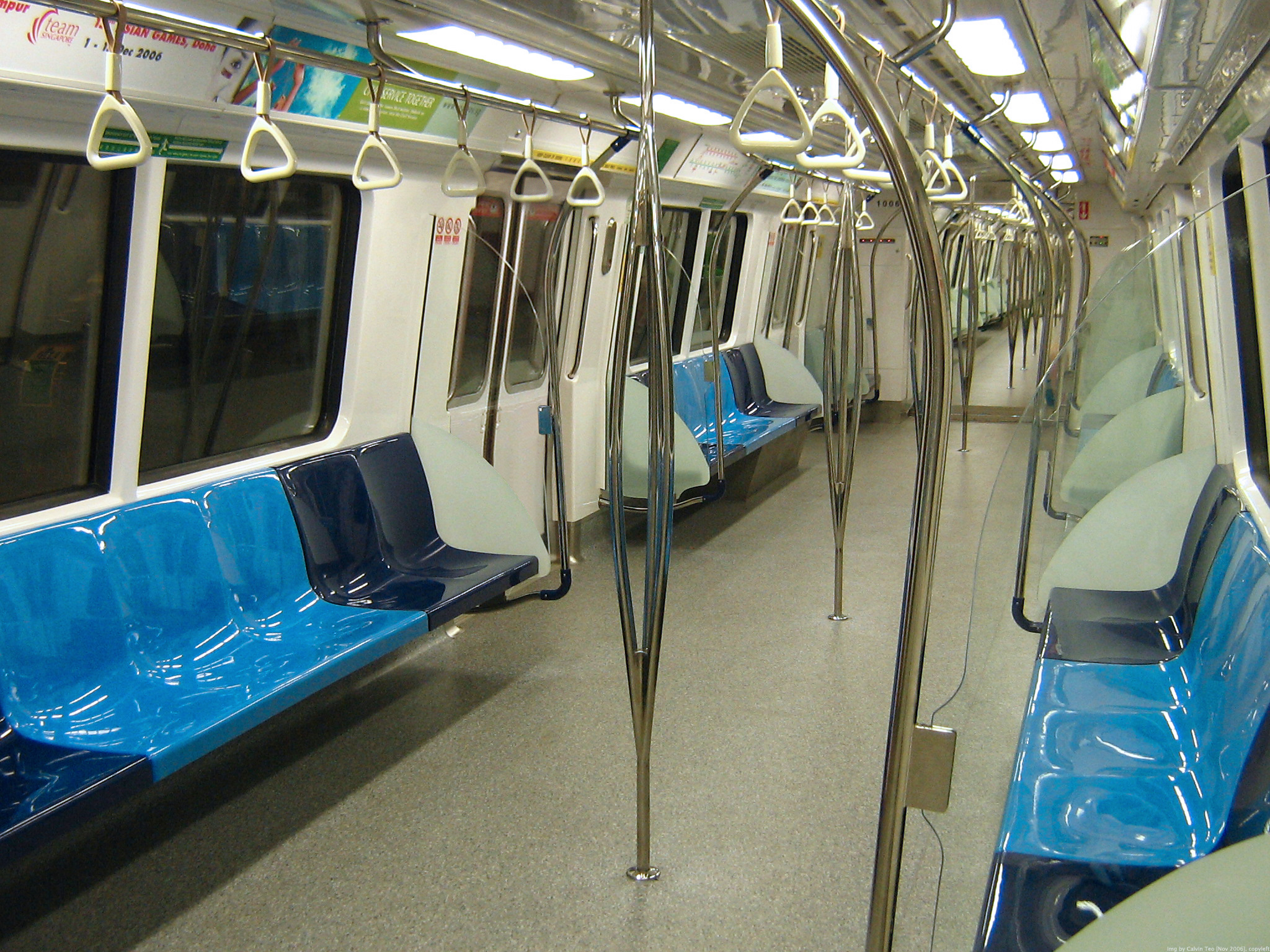
- Interior of a Kawasaki C151 before refurbishment Interior of a refurbished Kawasaki C151
- Stock type: Electric multiple unit
- In service: 7 November 1987 – 26 September 2025 (37 years, 323 days)
- Manufacturers: Kawasaki Heavy Industries (with Kinki Sharyo Co., Ltd., Nippon Sharyo, Ltd. and Tokyu Car Corporation)
- Built at: Kobe, Hyogo, Japan
- Constructed: 1986–1989
- Entered service: 7 November 1987; 39 years ago
- Refurbished: Hyundai Rotem (with Mitsui); 2006–2009
- Retired: 28 September 2025; 13 months ago
- Number built: 396 vehicles (66 sets) + 2 extra driving trailers for the money train
- Number retired: 396 vehicles (66 sets) + 2 extra driving trailers for the money train
- Successor: Alstom Movia R151
- Formation: 6 cars per trainset DT–M1–M2+M2–M1–DT; DT+M2–M1–DT (Money Train)
- Fleet numbers: 001/002 – 131/132 (regular six-car trainsets); 301/302 (2 extra driving trailers for cash transport)
- Capacity: 1920 passengers: 372 seats (as built); 296 seats (first refurbishment); 212 seats (middle seats removed); 208 seats (CBTC installation)
- Operator: SMRT Trains Ltd (SMRT Corporation)
- Depots: Bishan; Ulu Pandan; Tuas; Changi
- Lines served: North–South Line; East–West Line

Specifications
- Car body construction: Aluminium-alloy single-skinned construction
- Train length: 138.5 m (454 ft 4 3/4 in)
- Car length: 23.65 m (77 ft 7 in) (DT); 22.8 m (74 ft 10 in) (M)
- Width: 3.2 m (10 ft 6 in)
- Height: 3.69 m (12 ft 1 1/4 in)
- Doors: 1,450 mm (57 1/16 in), 8 per car
- Wheel diameter: 850–775 mm (33.5–30.5 in) (new–worn)
- Wheelbase: 2,500 mm (98 in)
- Maximum speed: 90 km/h (56 mph) (design); 80 km/h (50 mph) (service)
- Weight: 21.7 t (21.4 long tons; 23.9 short tons) (DT); 38.3 t (37.7 long tons; 42.2 short tons) (M1); 38.4 t (37.8 long tons; 42.3 short tons) (M2)
- Axle load: 16 t (16 long tons; 18 short tons)
- Traction system: As built: Mitsubishi GTO–4-quadrant chopper control; Upgraded: Toshiba IGBT–VVVF
- Traction motors: As built: 16 × Mitsubishi 145 kW (194 hp) 2-phase DC shunt-wound motor (1 hour rating: 375 V 430 A 2050 rpm); Upgraded: Toshiba permanent-magnet synchronous motor
- Power output: As built: 2.32 MW (3,111 hp)
- Transmission: Westinghouse-Natal (WN) drive; gear ratio: 6.57 : 1 (92 / 14)
- Acceleration: 1 m/s^{2} (2.2 mph/s)
- Deceleration: 1 m/s^{2} (2.2 mph/s) (service); 1.3 m/s^{2} (2.9 mph/s) (emergency)
- Electric systems: 750 V DC third rail
- Current collection: Collector shoe
- UIC classification: 2′2′+Bo′Bo′+Bo′Bo′+Bo′Bo′+Bo′Bo′+2′2′
- Bogies: Duewag SF 2100
- Braking systems: Westinghouse Brake & Signal electro-pneumatic, regenerative and rheostatic
- Safety systems: Original: Westinghouse Brake and Signal Company FS2000 ATP fixed block ATC under ATO GoA 2 (STO), with subsystems of ATP and ATS; Current: Thales SelTrac® moving block CBTC ATC under ATO GoA 3 (DTO), with subsystems of ATP, NetTrac ATS and CBI
- Coupling system: Scharfenberg
- Track gauge: 1,435 mm (4 ft 8 1/2 in) standard gauge

The Kawasaki Heavy Industries (KHI) C151 is a class of retired trains that were the first generation of electric multiple unit (EMU) rolling stock that operated on the North–South and East–West lines of Singapore's Mass Rapid Transit (MRT) system, manufactured by a consortium led by Kawasaki Heavy Industries (KHI) under Contract 151. They were first introduced in 1987 and retired in 2025, making them the oldest trains operated on the network.

Sixty-six trainsets consisting of six cars each and a single money train set consisting of four cars were contracted in 1984. They were manufactured from 1986 to 1989 in two batches by a Japanese consortium consisting of the namesake Kawasaki, Kinki Sharyo, Nippon Sharyo and Tokyu Car Corp following a round of intense competitive bidding by international rolling stock manufacturers.

The trains underwent a two-year mid-life interior refurbishment programme by Hyundai Rotem. After the 2011 major train disruptions on 15 and 17, December 2011, further plans to upgrade its mechanical components to increase its reliability were made. The first two trainsets to receive this upgrade, which included a replacement traction system to PMSM, entered service in July 2015. In total, 6 trains were fitted with the PMSM system by Toshiba. From June 2023, the Alstom Movia R151 trains began replacing the C151 trains, with the latter being entirely superseded by September 2025.

== Operational history ==
=== Tendering process ===
With construction of the Mass Rapid Transit system underway in 1983, Contract 151 called for the procurement of rolling stock – 150 cars in Phase I and an option for 246 cars in Phase II. In what the Financial Times described as "a time when manufacturers were begging for orders" for the global rolling stock market, competition for the contract was intense. At least eight companies from around the world submitted bids for what they had nicknamed the "Big One". Bidders included Metro-Cammell with Singapore Automotive Engineering, Kawasaki with three Japanese manufacturers, MAN with AEG, Siemens and Brown, Boveri & Cie, Francorail with Alsthom-Alantique, SOFRETU and Singapore Shipbuilding and Engineering, ASEA with Sembawang Shipyard, and a Bombardier Transportation-led consortium with Hawker Siddeley Canada and Brown Boveri Canada. Also during the bidding process, the Belgian BN-ACEC (makers of the light rail vehicle for Manila's system) and the Finnish Valmet and Strömberg submitted bids for the trains.

Competition for the contract was so fierce that it involved last-minute discounts, offers of free parts, and allegations of sabotage. Metro-Cammell, Kawasaki, and ASEA were shortlisted for the final round. Metro-Cammell based its design on the Hong Kong MTR M-Train EMU and proposed to use the GEC Traction camshaft resistance control propulsion system had they won the contract. Metro-Cammell also delivered a concept mock-up and was originally the favourite to win the contract. However, analysts became concerned that a measuring error involving the London Underground 1983 Stock during the evaluation period could jeopardise their bid.

On 12 April 1984, the Japanese consortium of Kawasaki with Nippon Sharyo, Tokyu Car Corp., and Kinki Sharyo was awarded Contract 151 at a cost of S$581.5 million for the construction of 396 passenger cars. Kawasaki won the contract; its bid – aided by favourable financing from Mitsui and extremely positive economic conditions in Japan – was 12% lower than those of other bidders, and the 50% lower energy usage of the Mitsubishi GTO-Chopper traction motors in comparison to the GEC Traction camshaft resistance control motors then used on the MTR M-Train EMU was also a major factor in said consortium being awarded the contract. The award was the largest single contract awarded in the initial construction of the system. Kawasaki also promised to supply $20.9m worth of complimentary spare parts after delivery. The loss of Contract 151 was a massive financial blow to Metro-Cammell, who were forced to reduce their workforce by half later that year.

=== Initial construction ===
A mock-up was manufactured in Japan after Kawasaki won the contract. It was shipped to Singapore and put on public display during the 1984 National Exhibition held in November at the World Trade Centre. The mock-up featured three choices of seating arrangements and colour schemes; members of the public were invited to give feedback on these options. The finalised interior design of the C151 trains consisted of a fully longitudinal seating arrangement. The bucket seats were made of plastic; glass partitions separated the seating areas from the passenger doors. Strap lines for standing passengers were installed in the middle of every car. The colour scheme of each adjacent car's interior was distinct to make car identification in cases of fault reporting easier for passengers. Originally the colour scheme of the driving trailer cars was orange, that of the second and fifth motor cars was blue, and that of the two centre motor cars was green. There were also nine seats between two doors; this was reduced to seven after the first round of refurbishment.

While the rolling stock and Mitsubishi Electric propulsion equipment were constructed in Japan, many parts were sourced from Europe. The trains were fitted with Stone Platt air-conditioning, Duewag bogies, Narita Mfg gangways and detrainment doors, Scharfenberg couplers, and Westinghouse brakes. The propulsion equipment used by Mitsubishi Electric was estimated to consume 50% less electricity than Hong Kong's existing MTR M-Train EMU. Its Automatic Train Control (ATC) signalling system was supplied by Westinghouse, which was capable of running at pre-programmed speeds that was activated by the train driver. While theoretically possible for it to be designed for a fully driverless operation using this signalling technology, the MRT Corporation (MRTC; now SMRT Corporation) decided against this option. These trains were assembled in Kobe, Japan, and then shipped to Singapore by Neptune Orient Lines. The first train set was delivered to the MRTC on 8 July 1986 at Bishan Depot, where it was officiated by Yeo Ning Hong. The following year, the first stretch of the MRT network opened alongside the C151 train's debut. The last was delivered in September 1989.

The C151 was also the basis for the Taipei Metro C301, built from 1992 to 1994 by the Kawasaki and Union Rail Car Partnership, for the Taipei Metro's Tamsui–Xinyi line. Between 1994 and 1996, original rail wheels of all 66 Kawasaki C151 trains were progressively replaced with German-made rail bogies equipped with absorbers that dampened vibrations on the wheels in motion. The replacements were made at a cost of $5.4 million, and were part of enhancement works in conjunction with the commencement of the Woodlands extension.

=== First refurbishment ===
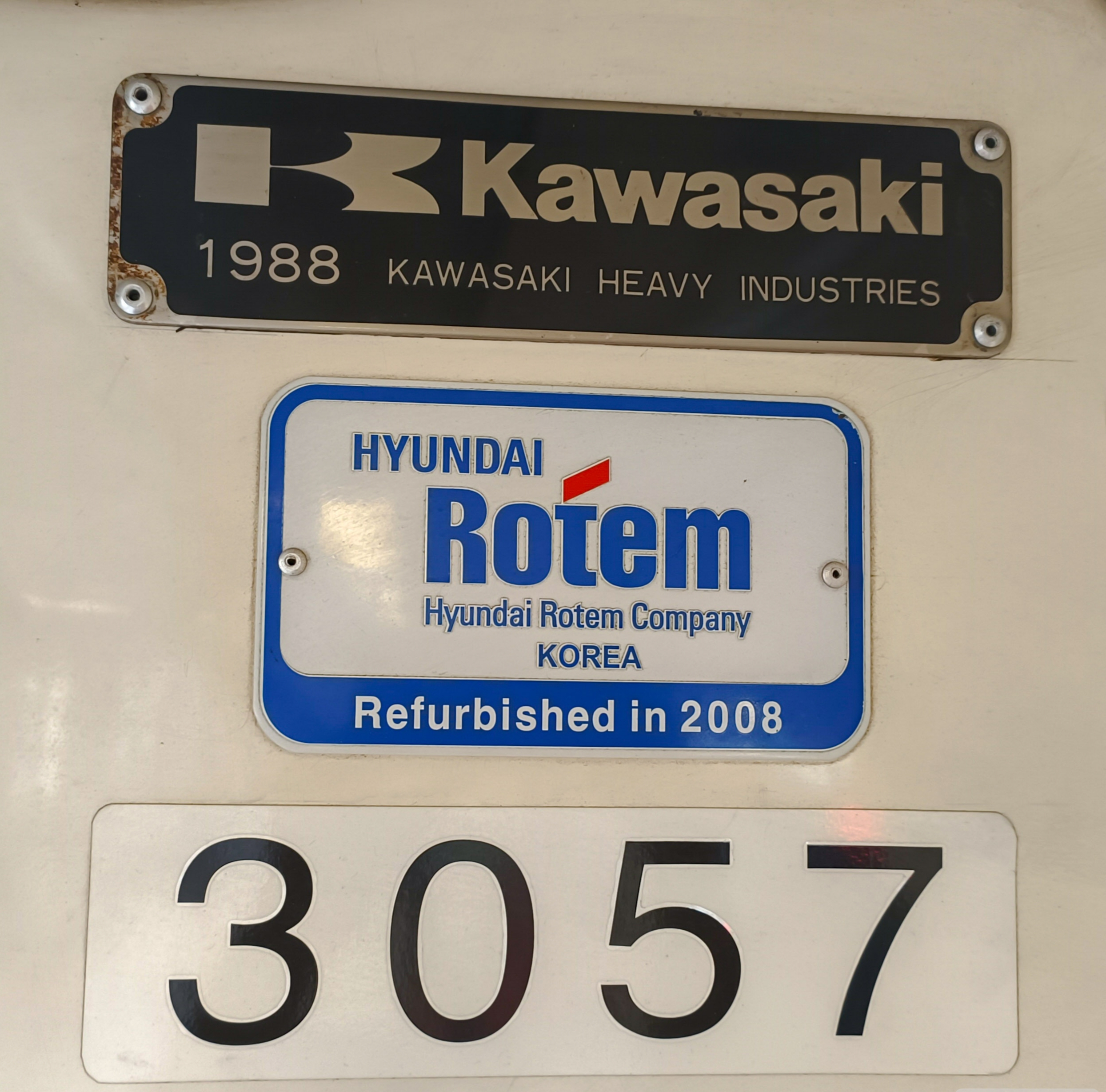
A Kawasaki builder's plate, Hyundai Rotem refurbishment plate and a car number label in a C151 train

On 3 September 2004, Hyundai Rotem, Mitsui, RM Transit Technology, and dU LexBuild received an order to refurbish all 396 carriages, costing S$142.7 million in total. The works included the refurbishment of interior fixtures, the addition of wheelchair spaces, the upgrading of onboard communications equipment, enhancement of the public announcement system, and general improvement of the cars' appearance. SMRT Corporation said the reasons for this refurbishment were due to wear and damage of important components over the past two decades, and water leaks from the air-conditioning systems on some trains. The company chose this option instead of buying new rolling stock as it would have cost S$792 million. The first refurbished train began revenue service on 5 November 2006, and all remaining trainsets had been refurbished by January 2009.

The refurbished C151 trains used the SMRT's repainted "Blackbird" livery scheme from the C751B, which was also later adopted in the C151A rolling stock. The interior fittings were replaced with white interior walls along with new seats that were installed further back to allow for more standing space. The colour of the seats in the driving trailer were also changed from orange to red. Seats of the refurbished train cars measured from 43 cm (16.9 in) to 48 cm (18.9 in). Four of seven seats per row were designated as priority seats, which were differentiated using a darker colour; this practice of distinguishing priority seats with darker shades was also used on the Taipei Metro rolling stock in Taiwan.

The Mitsubishi Electric propulsion system was retained, having performed better than expected. The wheelchair space was made available at the end of two mid-train cars, nearest to the elevators in elevated stations. Each three LED lights (top) that blink to warn passengers of closing doors were also introduced in the upper middle section of the door. Additional loud speakers and advertisement panels were added. Handgrips were moved to the support stanchion bars of the seats on the ceiling, and grab bars were located near the doors and at both ends of each car. The air-conditioning system was modified to match the system used in the C751B cars, with air-conditioning vents and in-flow fans installed.

In November 2008, SMRT Corporation and the Land Transport Authority (LTA) announced that the last ten refurbished trainsets would have only one-third of their seats replaced with rails to create extra standing space. This move was justified on grounds of allowing more standing space on board during peak-hour services. The reduction of seats per row from nine to seven after refurbishment was already unpopular among commuters; the decision to further reduce seating capacity drew sharp criticism against the operator and LTA. As of December 2015, one-third of the seats in all 66 C151 trains have been replaced by metal bars to create extra standing space.

=== Second refurbishment and replacement ===
Following major train disruptions on 15 and 17 December 2011, a Committee of Inquiry (COI) found that despite the first refurbishment of the C151 rolling stock, "there does not appear to be any upgrade in terms of engineering components". The COI was particularly critical of the inadequate and ageing emergency battery installed on the C151 and recommended the installation of a Train Integrated Management System (TIMS), found on the C751B and C151A trains.

In response, SMRT announced it was replacing important engineering components on the oldest C151 and C651 trains. This included changing the existing Mitsubishi Electric propulsion system with the newer insulated-gate bipolar transistor (IGBT) and Permanent Magnet Synchronous Motor (PMSM) propulsion system by Toshiba, technology which was also used in the Tokyo Metro's 1000 and 16000 series trains as well as the JR Kyushu's 305 series and the Hankyu 1000 series trains. In July 2015, two trains were trialed with the new propulsion system on the Changi Airport Extension. The trial was successful and was ported to the C651 refurbishment from 2016 to 2018, while four other trains were rolled out with PMSM all the way till August 2017. The replacement of the C151's traction motors into Toshiba PMSM was terminated prematurely by SMRT Corporation in September 2018 together with the termination of the C651 refurbishment project due to the New Rail Financing Framework (NRFF). In tandem with the replacement of the signalling system on the East–West Line and North–South Line with the newer Thales SelTrac signalling system, new equipment was installed in the passenger compartment of the trailer cars.

In January 2016, LTA had announced its intention to replace all trains with the new R151 trains. On 13 April 2017, LTA released a tender for contract R151, which would be the replacement train for all of the oldest MRT trains. On 25 July 2018, the contract was awarded to Bombardier Transportation at a sum of $1.2 billion, inclusive of a long-term service support package for up to 30 years. A total of 106 R151 trains were ordered to replace the entire fleet of C151 trains, as well as the second-generation Siemens C651 and third-generation Kawasaki Heavy Industries & Nippon Sharyo C751B trains. In July 2025, The Straits Times reported that 61 R151 trains had entered service, with the remainder scheduled to enter revenue service by 2026.

=== Withdrawal ===
The withdrawal of the C151 trains commenced on 22 June 2020. Initially projected to be completed by end-2026, the deadline was brought forward to the third quarter of 2025, following the derailment of a C151 train in September 2024.

On 26 September 2025, the final four C151 trains made their last revenue service runs. A commemorative trip on a C151 train was held on the North–South Line on 28 September, beginning at Ang Mo Kio and following the original route when the MRT was first opened, from Yio Chu Kang to Toa Payoh. Several trains are preserved at Safti City Track 1 and used for training purposes by the Singapore Armed Forces, and at Changi Exhibition Centre, where they are used in the filming of Mediacorp drama series Third Rail (2022). The last C151 train was scrapped in September 2026.

== Operational details ==
=== Livery ===
The cars had an aluminium-alloy single-skinned construction using large extruded profiles, and were delivered unpainted to save time. A red adhesive strip ran through the length of the cars in the middle to match the operator's visual branding. The unpainted cars had a shiny appearance upon delivery, but as dirt and grime accumulated it became a recurring problem for the operator and attracted several public complaints. In response, the MRTC built a wash machine at Bishan Depot in an attempt to clean up the cars' exterior proper. After refurbishment, the problem was solved by covering the cars' exterior entirely with giant stickers, creating a blackbird livery with a red band-colour running down the middle and a grey band-colour at the bottom that is similar to the newer generation C751B and C151A rolling stocks.

=== Passenger announcement and information systems ===
The Kawasaki C151 sets originally had no visual passenger information system; station announcements had to be made by the train operator. An automatic audio announcement system using voice synthesisers was installed on each train by September 1994. The first iteration of the door closing buzzer announcements, which replaced the initial door chimes, was fully introduced by April 1997. Kawasaki also built a specially modified DT trailer car to serve as a money train.

SMRT first attempted to install a passenger information system, SMRTime, on trains using LCD displays in 1999; these have since been removed. In 2008, 4 units of vacuum fluorescent display (VFD) were mounted on the ceiling and 8 units of dynamic route maps were mounted above every door in each car of 2 train carriages for a 2-month trial. The new SMRT Active Route Map Information System (STARiS) was then progressively introduced to all C151 trainsets, and subsequently to Siemens C651 and Kawasaki C751B trains for a cost of S$12 million – S$20,000 per car.

=== Technical dimensions ===
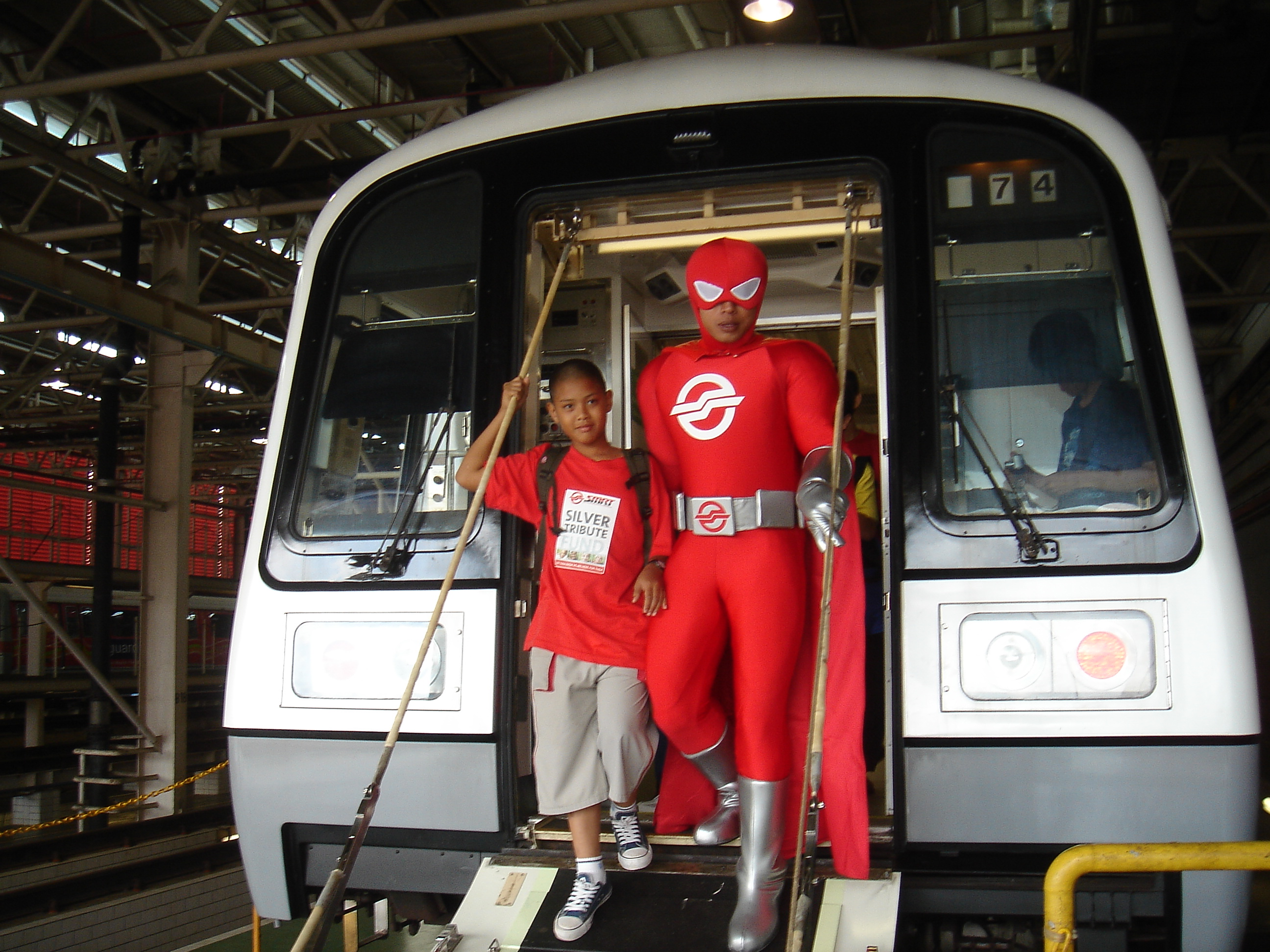
Captain SMRT demonstrating the use of a refurbished C151's emergency detrainment ramp

The configuration of a C151 in revenue service is DT–M1–M2–M2–M1–DT, where DT is a driving trailer car, M1 is a motor car, and M2 is a motor car with Hostler control, and each car can seat 62 people. M2 is the heaviest car at 38.4 tonnes (37.8 long tons; 42.3 short tons), followed by M1 at 38.3 tonnes (37.7 long tons; 42.2 short tons) and DT at 32.2 tonnes (31.7 long tons; 35.5 short tons). The nominal operation speed for the C151 is 80 kilometres per hour (50 mph), with a maximum speed of 90 kilometres per hour (56 mph); the C151 can also accelerate up to 1 metre per second (3.3 ft/s), with a deceleration of 0.8 metres per second (2.6 ft/s) that could go down to 1.3 metres per second (4.3 ft/s) in emergency situations. The carbody unit includes four equally spaced doorways across the train length, with a curved roof structure to allow the evaporator portion of the split air conditioning system to function. The carbody's maximum vertical loading is about 21,660 kilograms (47,750 lb), or 380 passengers, but its estimated vertical loading during service is around 18,240 kilograms (40,210 lb), or 320 passengers.

Cars of C151
Car Type	Driver cab	Motor	Collector shoe	Car length		Wheelchair space
Car Type	Driver cab	Motor	Collector shoe	mm	ft in	Wheelchair space
DT	✓	✗	✓	23,650	77 ft 7.1 in	✗
M1	✗	✓	✓	22,800	74 ft 9.6 in	✗
M2	✗	✓	✓	22,800	74 ft 9.6 in	✓

== Major incidents ==
Throughout its almost four decade history, the C151 rolling stock was involved in the following high-profile incidents:

- Clementi rail accident: On 5 August 1993, two C151 trains sets collided at Clementi station because of a 50-litre (11 imp gal; 13 US gal) oil spillage on the track by a maintenance locomotive, resulting in 132 injuries.
- On 17 May 2010, Oliver Fricker trespassed and vandalised a C151 with graffiti at Changi Depot. The graffiti was initially mistaken for an advertisement and was not spotted until the car was filmed and the video was uploaded to YouTube by a railway enthusiast. Fricker was convicted and sentenced to seven months' imprisonment and caning. The public perceived this incident to have serious security implications, as the depot was considered a sensitive installation.
- In a major MRT disruption on 15 December 2011, a C151 train was stalled in the tunnel and its backup battery failed. The passenger compartments experienced a blackout and loss of ventilation, leading to one passenger smashing a train door window to avoid suffocation. The battery failure led to criticism by the Committee of Inquiry on the condition of the aging emergency batteries installed on all C151 trains. SMRT had proposed an upgrading plan to address this issue.
- Pasir Ris rail accident: On 22 March 2016, two SMRT maintenance trainees were run over and killed by an oncoming C151 train reportedly travelling at 60 km/h, 150 metres from Pasir Ris MRT station, at approximately 11.10 am. The maintenance staff were part of a group of 15 personnel tasked to investigate a possible signalling system fault on the tracks near the Pasir Ris MRT station. This incident led to a 2.5 hour train service disruption, with at least 10,000 commuters affected.
- 2024 East–West MRT line disruption: On 25 September 2024, a C151 train had a bogie on its third carriage separated from the running rail near Dover station, causing extensive damage to track and equipment between Dover and Jurong East stations. This included 46 rail breaks over 1.6km of track and three track switches. The derailment also caused the train to trip the power supply before stalling outside Ulu Pandan Depot, causing four other trains in service between Clementi and Buona Vista to stall as well. This incident led to a train service disruption between Jurong East and Buona Vista from 25 September to 30 September 2024 for repair works, making it one of the longest unplanned MRT disruptions in Singapore's history. Train services resumed on 1 October 2024 with trains travelling at lower speeds than normal. The incident resulted in SMRT bringing forward the C151's retirement date from end-2026 to end of September 2025.
