= Alstom Movia R151 =

Passenger rail cars in Singapore

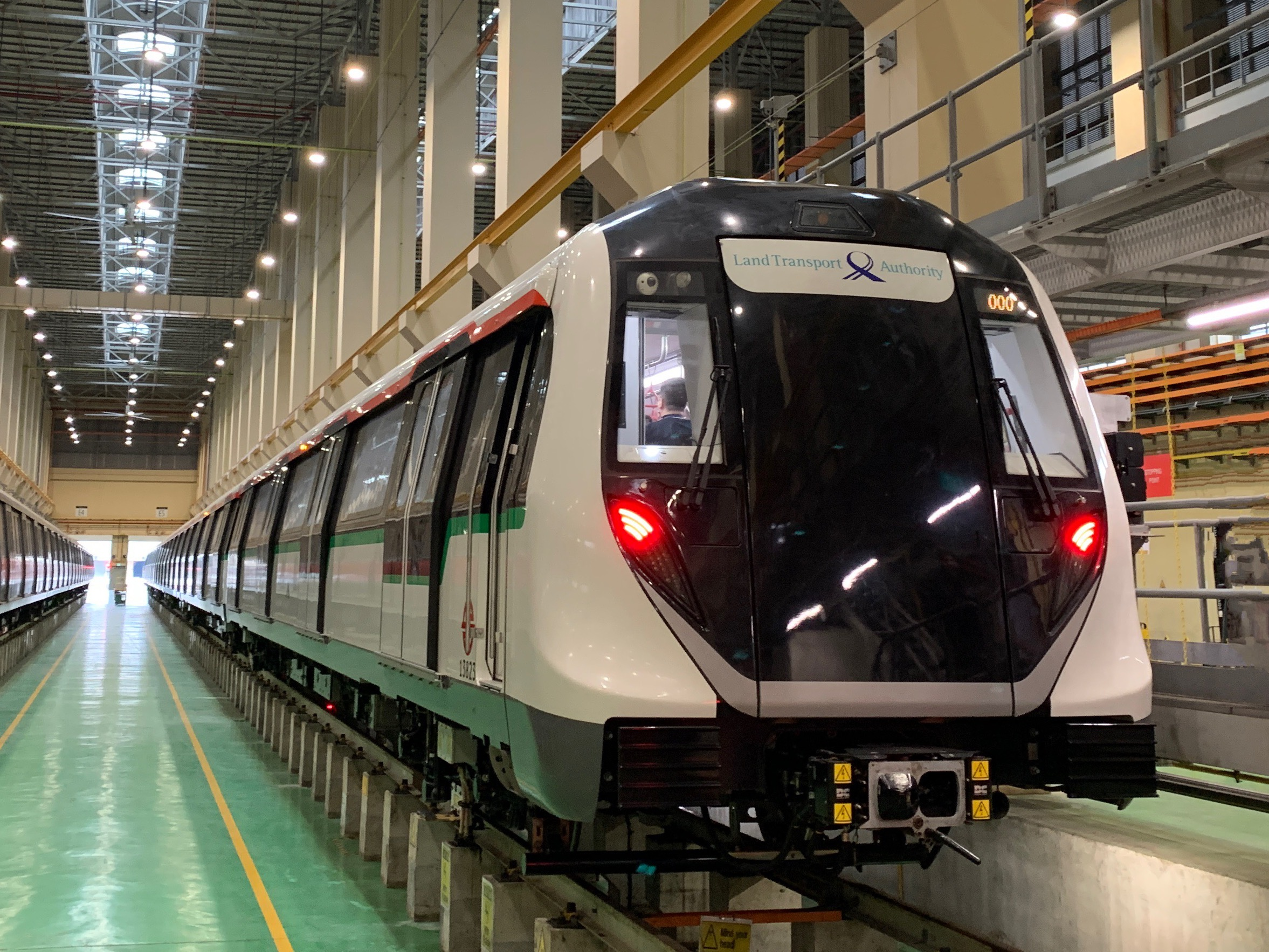
- Alstom Movia R151 at Tuas Depot

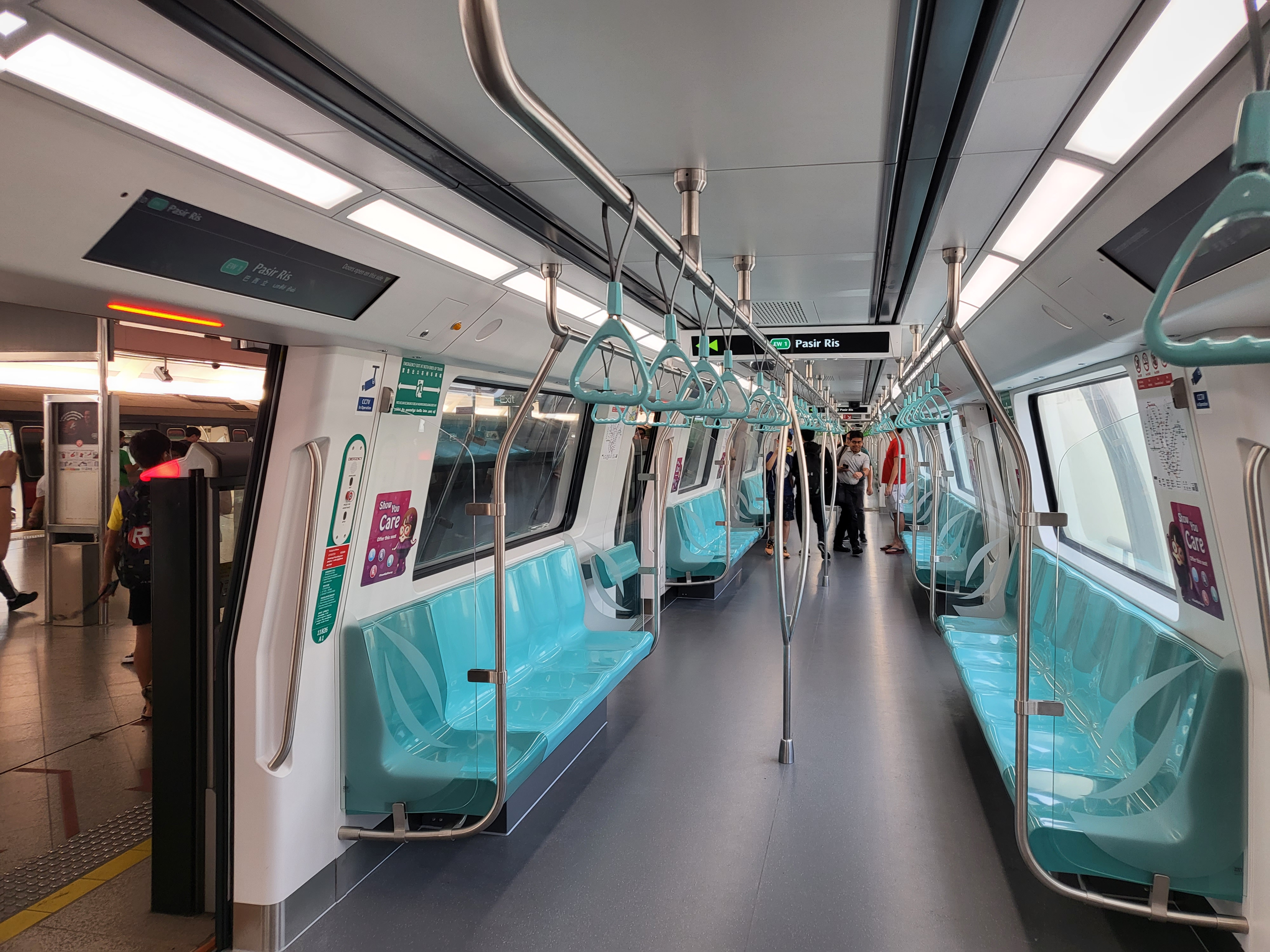
- Interior of the Alstom Movia R151
- Stock type: Electric multiple unit
- In service: 4 June 2023; 3 years ago – Present
- Manufacturers: Changchun Alstom Railway Vehicles (Note: Formerly Changchun Bombardier Railway Vehicles.) (Alstom (Note: Formerly Bombardier Transportation prior to its acquisition by Alstom.) and CRRC Changchun)
- Built at: Changchun, China
- Family name: Movia
- Replaced: Kawasaki Heavy Industries C151; Siemens C651; Kawasaki–Nippon Sharyo C751B
- Constructed: 2020 – 2026
- Entered service: 4 June 2023; 3 years ago
- Number built: 636 vehicles (106 sets)
- Number in service: 636 vehicles (106 sets)
- Formation: 6 per trainset DT–M1–M2+M2–M1–DT
- Fleet numbers: 151/152 – 165/166 801/802 – 897/898 901/902 – 997/998
- Capacity: 1920 passengers (224 seats)
- Operator: SMRT Trains Ltd (SMRT Corporation)
- Depots: Bishan; Ulu Pandan; Tuas; East Coast
- Lines served: North–South Line; East–West Line

Specifications
- Car body construction: Aluminium-alloy construction
- Train length: 138.86 m (455 ft 6 7/8 in)
- Car length: 23.83 m (78 ft 2 in) (DT); 22.8 m (74 ft 10 in) (M)
- Width: 3.2 m (10 ft 6 in)
- Height: 3.7 m (12 ft 1 5/8 in)
- Doors: 1,450 mm (57 1/8 in), 8 per car, 4 per side
- Maximum speed: 90 km/h (56 mph) (design); 80 km/h (50 mph) (service)
- Traction system: Alstom MITrac TC1500 SiC–VVVF
- Acceleration: 1.15 m/s^{2} (3.8 ft/s^{2})
- Deceleration: 1.2 m/s^{2} (3.9 ft/s^{2}) (service); 1.3 m/s^{2} (4.3 ft/s^{2}) (emergency)
- Electric systems: 750 V DC third rail
- Current collection: Collector shoe
- UIC classification: 2′2′+Bo′Bo′+Bo′Bo′+Bo′Bo′+Bo′Bo′+2′2′
- Safety systems: Thales SelTrac® moving block CBTC ATC under ATO GoA 3 (DTO), with subsystems of ATP, NetTrac ATS and CBI
- Coupling system: Dellner
- Track gauge: 1,435 mm (4 ft 8 1/2 in) standard gauge

The Alstom Movia R151 is the seventh generation electric multiple unit (EMU) rolling stock in operation on the existing North–South (NSL) and East–West (EWL) lines of Singapore's Mass Rapid Transit (MRT) system. It is manufactured by Changchun Alstom Railway Vehicles, a joint venture of Alstom and CRRC Changchun under Contract R151 as part of their Movia family of trains.

The new rolling stock progressively replaced all of the C151s, C651s and C751Bs, all of which had been in service for at least 25 years when the R151s entered service in 2023. These new trains are part of the North–South and East–West lines' core systems upgrade and renewal programme. 106 six-car high-capacity trainsets comprising 636 cars were delivered from 21 February 2022 onwards, with the first train entering service on the East–West Line on 4 June 2023 and the last train entering operations on 30 September 2026.

== Overview ==
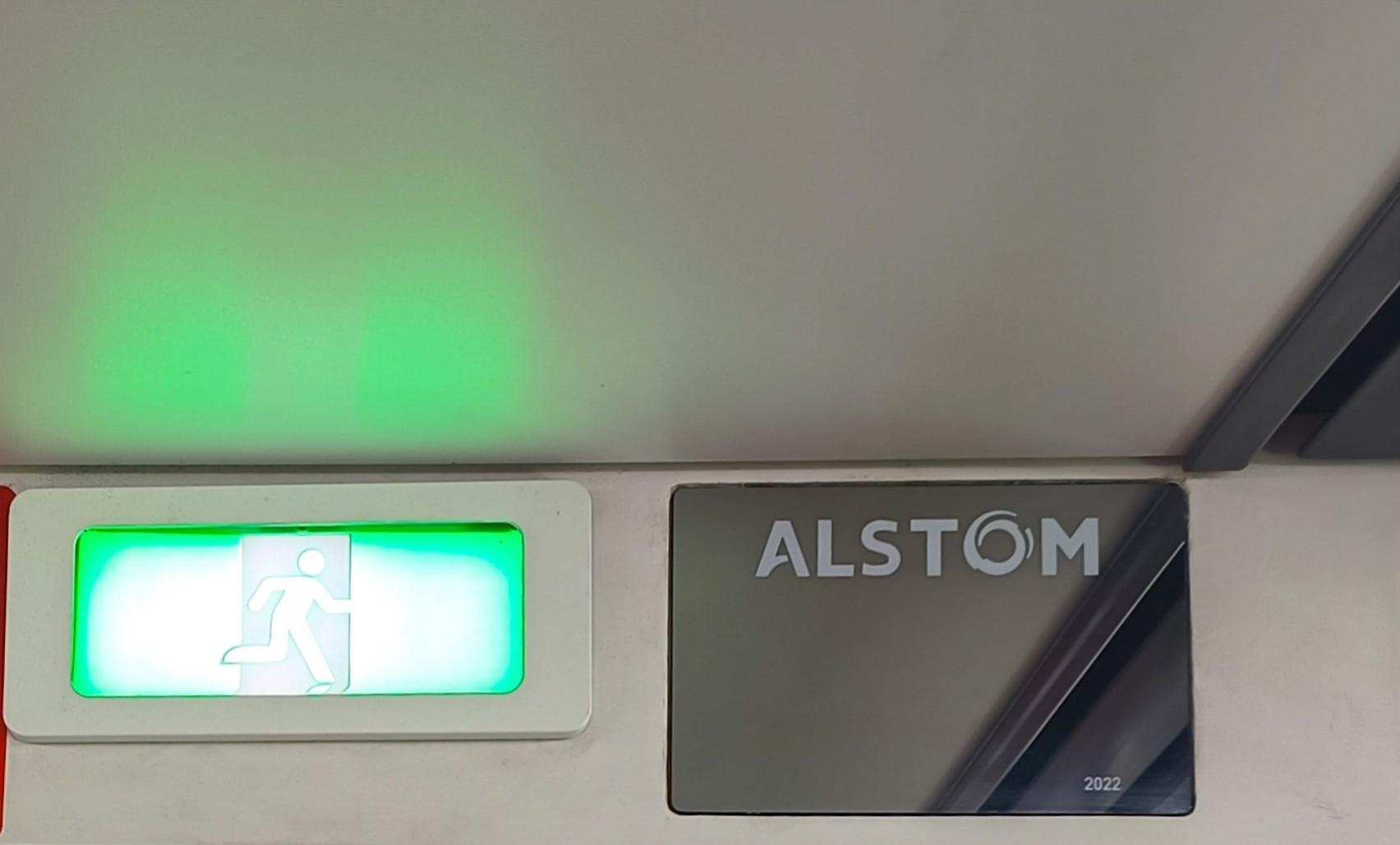
Builder's plate of a R151 train

In October 2016, the Land Transport Authority (LTA) announced plans to replace the first-generation rolling stock on the North–South and East–West lines as part of an asset renewal programme for the two lines. The LTA awarded the contract for the replacement of the first-generation trains to Bombardier Transportation in July 2018, which comprised the provision of 66 new trains, and their maintenance and technical support, to replace all the first-generation C151 trains, which had been in service for more than 30 years.

On 1 April 2019, Bombardier Transportation and the LTA launched a mockup of the interior of the R151 at the SG Mobility Gallery at LTA's office at Hampshire Road.

In September 2020, the LTA ordered an additional 40 R151 trains at a cost of S$337.8 million, to replace all 19 second-generation C651 trains, and all 21 third-generation C751B trains, which had been in service for more than 20 years. These trains, and the ones ordered in 2018, were to be assembled by Bombardier in Changchun.

The first two trains arrived in Singapore on 21 February 2022, and the remaining trains will progressively be delivered. The trains underwent testing and commissioning works before entering passenger service from 4 June 2023. All R151 trains entered service by 30 September 2026.

== Tender ==
The tender for trains under Contract R151 closed on 4 September 2017 with five bids. The LTA subsequently shortlisted all of them, and the tender results were published.

S/N	Name of Tenderer	Amount (S$)	Option 9 (Long Term Service Support)
1	Alstom Transport S.A. / Alstom Transport (S) Pte Ltd Consortium	682,696,431.00	S$626,697,233.00
2	Bombardier (Singapore) Pte Ltd	827,075,921.00	SGD 269,652,420.94 + EUR 75,135,673.16 + GBP 2,670,699.27
3	Construcciones y Auxiliar de Ferrocarriles, S.A.	867,275,662.00	S$307,320,742
4	Hyundai Rotem Company	696,960,000.00	S$517,973,000.00
5	Kawasaki Heavy Industries, Ltd. / Kawasaki Heavy Industries(Singapore) Pte Ltd & CRRC Qingdao Sifang Consortium / Singapore CRRC Sifang Railway Vehicles Service Pte. Ltd. Consortium	941,906,324.00	S$1,111,653,342

== Design and features ==
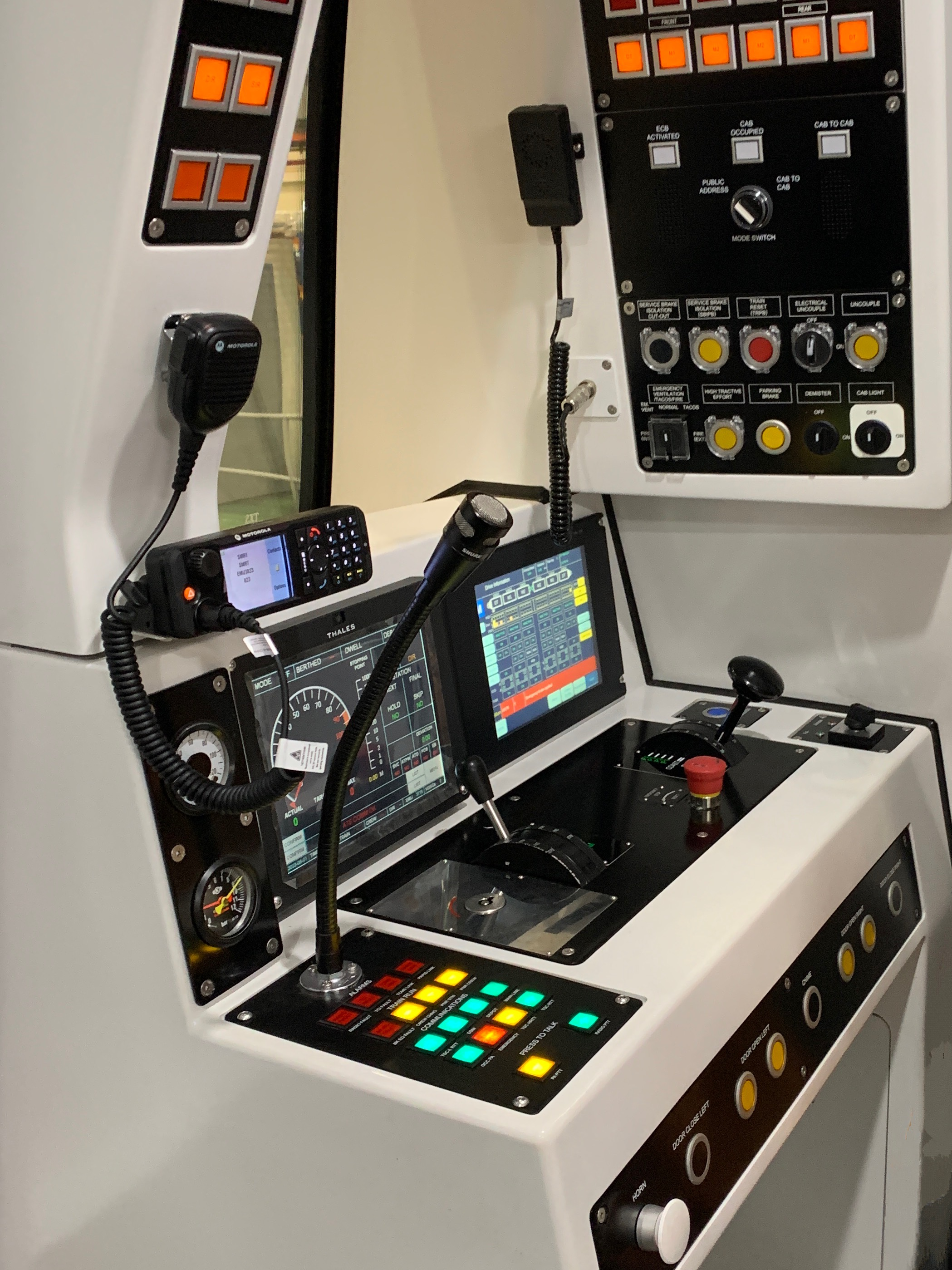
Driver's cab of the Alstom Movia R151

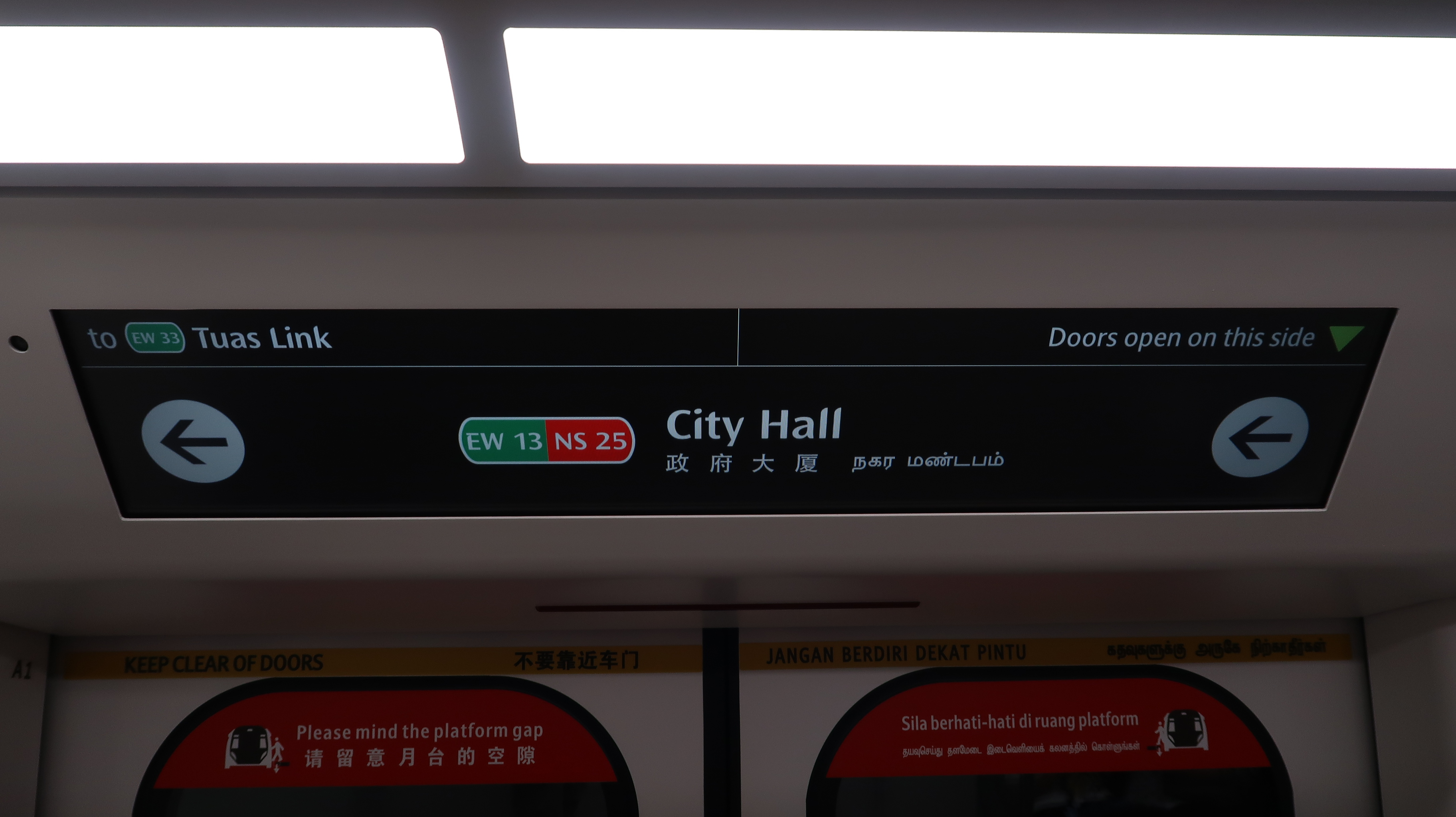
Car Door Display of the Alstom Movia R151

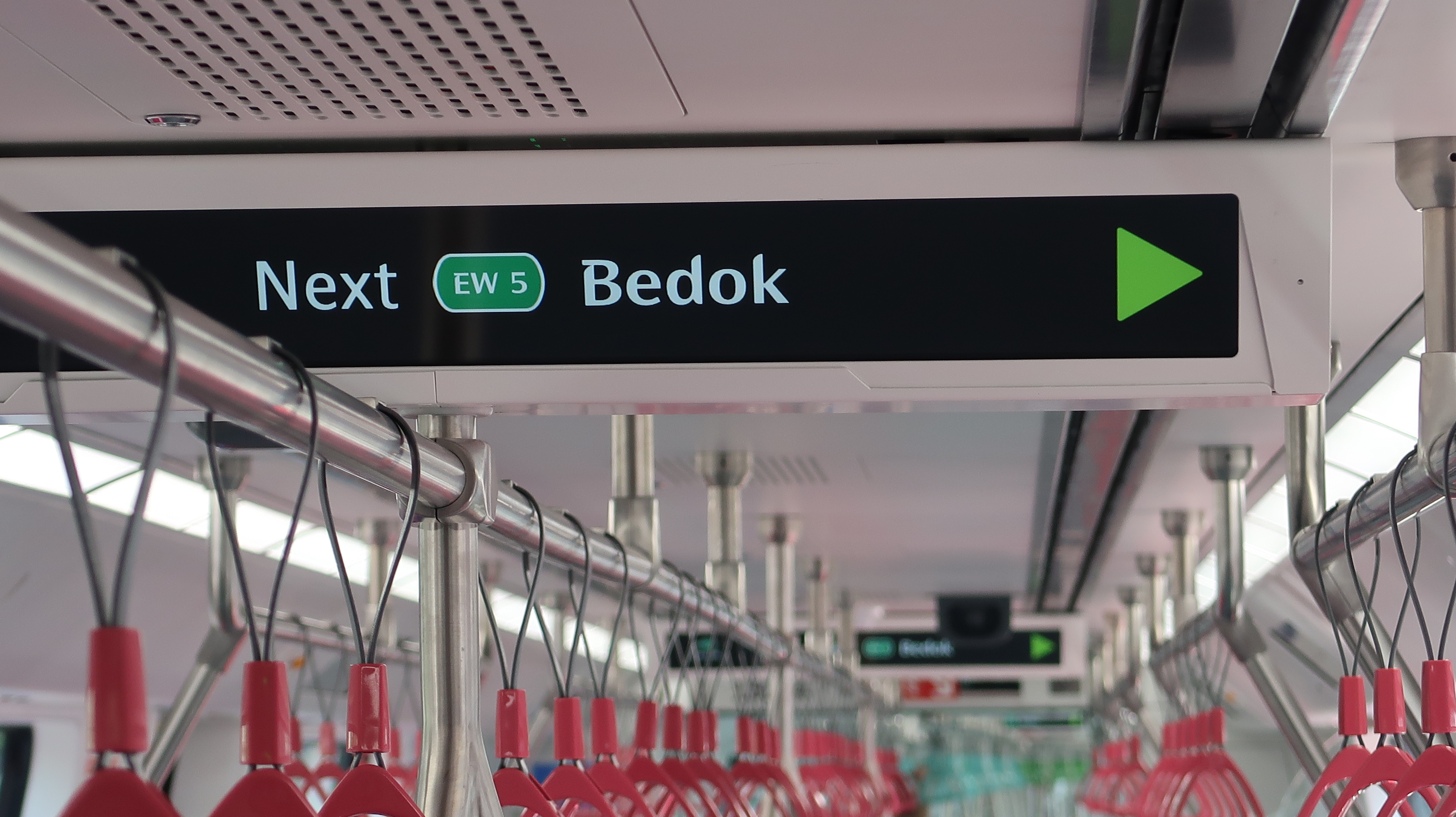
Ceiling Level Display of the Alstom Movia R151

The exterior of the R151 trains feature a new livery of green and red stripes against a black and white background running around the cars, similar to the C151C. The interior of the trains sport certain design features similar to the C951, such as the matte finishing of the walls, positioning of the overhead lighting as well as the builder plates.

The trains include several unique engineering features, such as an onboard self-test system that checks whether the train is fit for operation prior to revenue service. In addition, four trains will be equipped with an automatic track inspection system consisting of cameras, lasers and sensors to detect rail defects. Condition monitoring sensors and analytic systems will be subsequently equipped on all trains to detect developing faults and to facilitate prompt rectification as part of predictive maintenance.

The trains have wider areas near the doors to facilitate efficient movement of passengers in and out of the train. Preliminary designs of the R151 featured tip-up seats to increase passenger capacity, while catering to parents with prams, wheelchair users and people with personal mobility devices or foldable bicycles without reducing seat count. However, these tip-up seats has since been replaced with perch seats in the final product of the R151.

== Train formation ==
The coupling configuration of an R151 in revenue service is DT–M1–M2+M2–M1–DT. D stands for "driver's desk", M for "motor" and T for "trailer".

Cars of R151
Car Type	Driver Cab	Motor	Collector Shoe	Car Length		Wheelchair Bay
Car Type	Driver Cab	Motor	Collector Shoe	m	ft in	Wheelchair Bay
DT	Yes	No	Yes	23.83	78 ft 2.2 in	No
M1	No	Yes	Yes	22.8	74 ft 9.6 in	No
M2	No	Yes	Yes	22.8	74 ft 9.6 in	Yes
