= Bishan Depot =

Mass Rapid Transit train depot in Bishan, Singapore

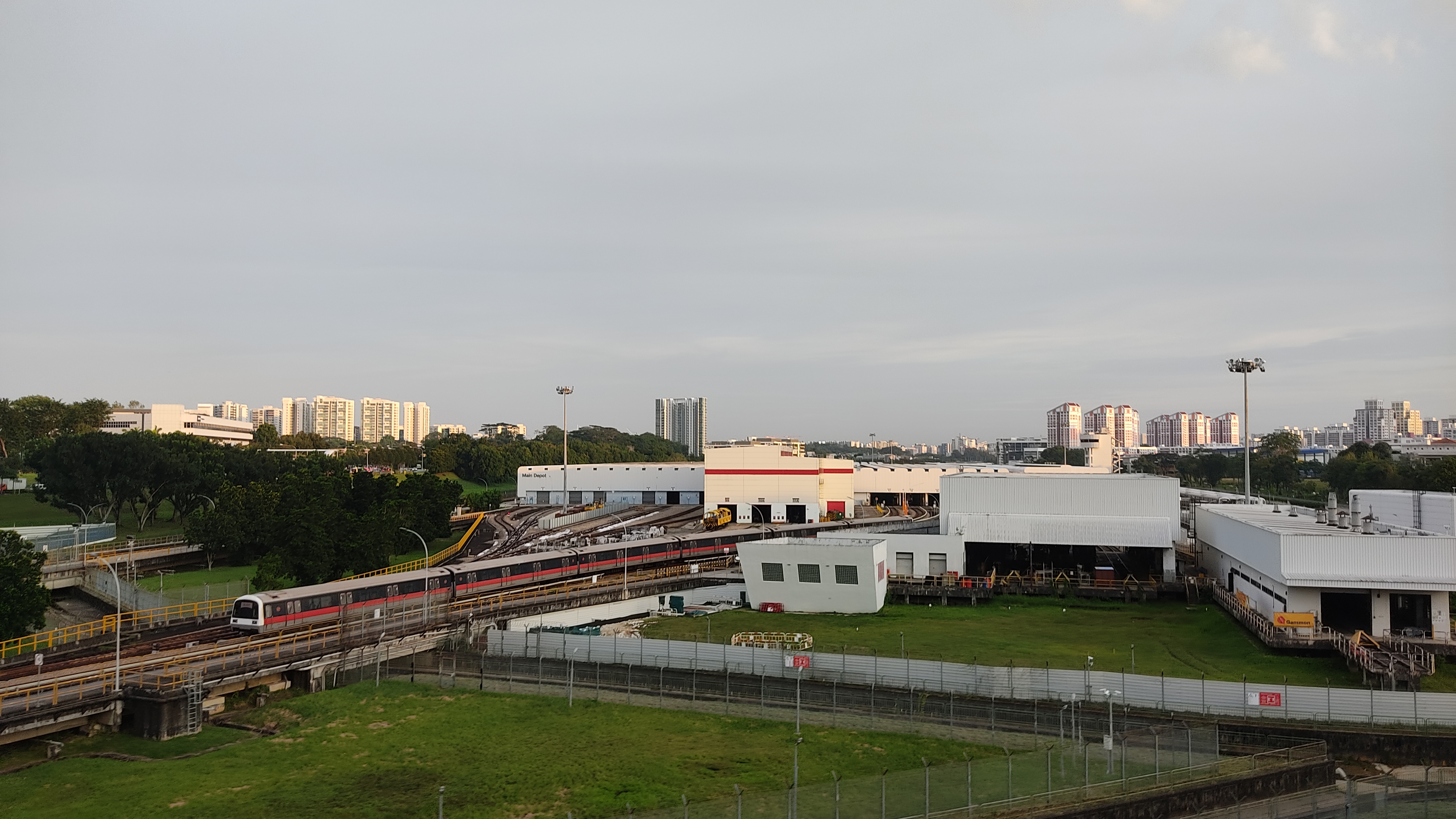
- Overview of the depot as viewed from the mainline tracks, October 2020
- Interactive map of Bishan Depot

Location
- Location: 300 Bishan Road, Singapore 579828
- Coordinates: 1°21′19.03″N 103°51′14.43″E

Characteristics
- Owner: Land Transport Authority
- Operator: SMRT Trains
- Depot code: BSD
- Type: At-grade
- Roads: Ang Mo Kio Ave 1, Bishan Road
- Rolling stock: Kawasaki–Sifang C151A; Kawasaki–Sifang C151B; Kawasaki–Sifang C151C; Alstom Movia R151
- Routes served: NSL North–South Line

History
- Opened: 7 November 1987; 39 years ago

Bishan Depot (Chinese: 碧山车厂) is a depot of the Mass Rapid Transit in Bishan, Singapore. It was completed in 1986 by American architect Vikas M. Gore and the 12,000 square metres maintenance area at a cost of S$300 million.

The depot comprises a storage yard with a capacity of 59 trains and an area of 300,000 m^{2}. The depot also houses a central maintenance facility with train overhaul facilities and a supply of trains travelling on the North–South Line operated by SMRT. Bishan Depot previously provided maintenance work for the East–West Line, prior to the opening of the Tuas Depot. It also acts as a training centre for newly recruited staff, and is where the faregate operation department is located. The depot is located between Ang Mo Kio station and Bishan station on the North–South Line and has three reception tracks: two tracks northbound towards Ang Mo Kio station and one track southbound towards Bishan station.

== History ==
Plans for the Mass Rapid Transit (MRT) system's depot were first conceptualised in May 1980 as part of Phase III of the MRT study. It was proposed for the depot to have two stabling yards and be built in Clementi as it was recommended in the study to build the East–West Line first, which would be near the site. A plot of land in the area was earmarked a month later, though in October 1982, it was announced by the Provisional Mass Rapid Transit Authority that the depot will be moved to Kampong San Teng (Bishan) as the North–South Line (NSL) would be built first instead of the East–West Line.

The contract for the design of Bishan depot and the trackwork for the MRT system was awarded to Electrowatt Engineering Service Ltd in June 1983 for S$6 million (1983) (US$2.84 million), where it would work closely with Deutsche Eisenbahn Consulting GmbH, DP Architects, and Lau Downie and Partners. It was expected for Electrowatt to take 15 months to design the depot, with the depot expected to be open by 1987. By June 1984, ten groups were prequalified for Contract 101C, which detailed the construction of Bishan Depot, and six groups for Contract 101P, which detailed the supply of the piling works to the depot. Balken Piling, a joint venture between Hong Leong Industries and Goteborgs Betongpalar, ended up winning Contract 101P in July for S$10.5 million (1984) (US$4.92 million) whilst Nishimatsu and Lum Chang won Contract 101C on 8 September 1984 for S$164 million (1984) (US$76.88 million).

On 4 July 1985, there was a MRT mishap where four workers were trapped within 15 minutes. The MRT had built rail tracks for testing trains in 1986–1987.

On 11 February 2007, SMRT organised the SMRT Cram Jam! cum Learning Journey and Charity Bazaar to raise funds for the SMRT Silver Tribute Fund. The Cram Jam took place in the morning seeking an entry into the Singapore Book of Records by cramming people inside a standard Kawasaki C151 car (car used: 2027), a Mercedes O405G Hispano Habit bus (bus registered: TIB1202K) and a Ssangyong Rodius/Stavic MPV cab. The Singapore Police Force crammed 550 officers inside the train car, 235 staff from SMRT were crammed inside the bus and 44 Girl Guides Singapore cadets crammed themselves into the cab. Games, carnival food and a 90-minute tour around the Bishan Depot were organised.

A C751B MRT train was vandalised in an apparent security breach at Bishan Depot on 17 August 2011. The train was then put into service before the vandalism was discovered. The Land Transport Authority subsequently fined SMRT S$200,000 for failing to detect, in a timely manner, the graffiti on the train. On 15 July 2016, local and Australian media reported that between April and July 2015, two Americans, Jim Harper and Danielle Bremner, posted a series of vandalism videos online under the pseudonyms Utah and Ether, with one video showing them committing the act at Bishan Depot. Harper was arrested and jailed for six months in May in Melbourne, Australia, while his partner fled.

Another incident of a MRT train being vandalized happened on a Kawasaki Heavy Industries C151 set on 5 May 2014. Police reports were made in the early hours of the morning when trains were being dispatched from the depot.

A third case of vandalism took place on 8 November 2014 when two Germans, Andreas Von Knorre and Elton Hinz, spraypainted a cabin on a C151 train after breaking into the depot. They were each sentenced to nine months in jail and given three strokes of the cane, as per the Vandalism Act.

A technical officer working at the depot died as a result of injuries sustained while operating a hydraulic press machine in the rolling stock shed on the morning of 23 March 2020. Following the accident, SMRT imposed a safety time-out and suspended maintenance works during the investigation period.

== Installation and upgrading shed ==
The rolling stock workshop and Tracks 10–12, built enclosed are where various programmes are conducted. Only five trains can undergo installation works during each 3- to 18-week period. The upgrading shed was officially closed down on 18 September 2018 with the arrival of Kawasaki Heavy Industries C151 trains.

- Refurbishment of Kawasaki Heavy Industries C151 sets (from 2006 to 2008 as well as 2010 to 2013). Prior to the opening of Pioneer and Joo Koon, there were 94 trains in service at each time. It was increased to 96 in 2010, and finally to 106 in 2012.
- Upgrading the signalling system (from 2014 to 2016) in all trains. It had increased the total cohort to 120 in 2014.
