= Geylang Bahru =

- Subzone of Kallang Planning Area

Other transcription(s)
  - Malay: Geylang Bahru (Rumi) ݢيلڠ بهرو (Jawi)
  - Chinese: 芽笼峇鲁 (Simplified) 芽籠峇魯 (Traditional); Yálóng Bālǔ (Pinyin); Gê-láng Bā-ló͘ (Hokkien POJ)
  - Tamil: கேலாங் பாரு Kēlāṅ pāru (Transliteration)
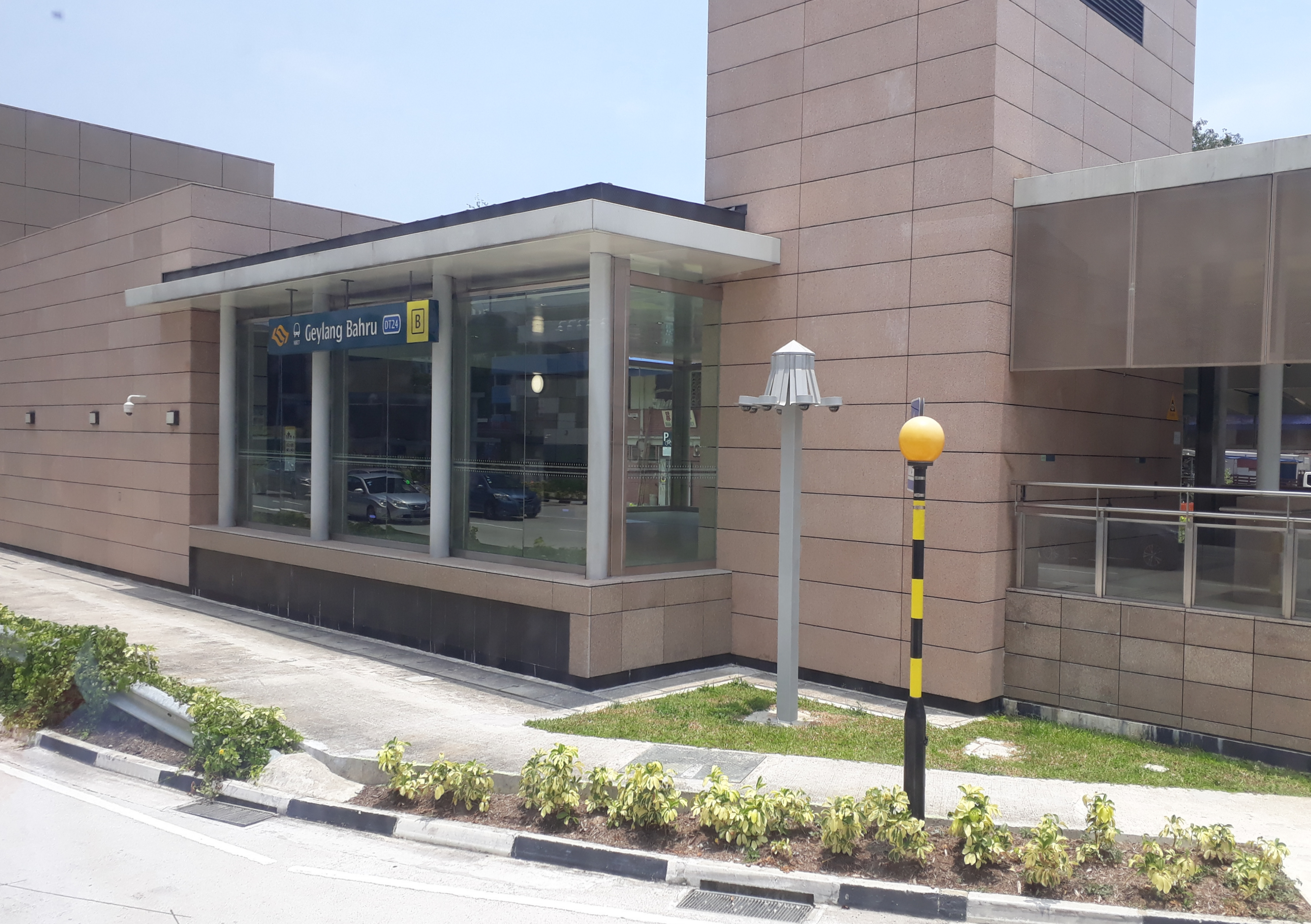
- Exit of Geylang Bahru MRT station at the junction of Geylang Bahru and Kallang Bahru
- Interactive map of Geylang Bahru
- Coordinates: 1.32226°N 103.86982°E
- Country: Singapore
- Region: Central Region
- Planning Area: Kallang

Area
  - Total: 0.74 km^{2} (0.29 sq mi)

Population (2015)
  - Total: 12,870
  - Density: 17,000/km^{2} (45,000/sq mi)

Geylang Bahru is a subzone within the planning area of Kallang, Singapore, as defined by the Urban Redevelopment Authority (URA). It is bounded by the Pan Island Expressway (PIE) in the east; the Pelton Canal in the south; the Kallang River in the west; and Serangoon Road in the north.

Previously, "Kolam Ayer" encompassed an area that included present-day Geylang Bahru subzone and the adjacent Kallang Way subzone, the latter of which is officially organised under Geylang Planning Area. Several places within Geylang Bahru still retain this name: Kolam Ayer Community Club and Kolam Ayer Neighbourhood Police Post, as well as the road Jalan Kolam Ayer. Made up of both residential and industrial developments, other notable places in Geylang Bahru include the Kallang Basin Swimming Complex, Kallang Distripark, the main office of Jalan Besar Town Council, the office of the Singapore Examinations and Assessment Board (SEAB) and Ministry of Manpower (MOM) Services Centre. Geylang Bahru MRT station along the Downtown Line serves this subzone.

Geylang Bahru is also the name of a two-way road in the area. This road connects Bendemeer Road in the north with Upper Boon Keng Road in the south, with major junction located at Kallang Bahru. This road is unique as it is one of the few roads in Singapore to have a name without any generic element. The name of the subzone was derived from this road.

== Etymology ==
The name. Kolam Ayer, was derived from the Malay phrase "kolam air", which translates to "pond water".

The subzone's current name, Geylang Bahru, came from a road in the area; "Geylang" is a place in Singapore, now considered a separate planning area from Kallang, while "Bahru" is the old Malay spelling for "baru", meaning "new".

Geylang Bahru first appeared as a proposed road in a street directory in 1969. The road marked as Geylang Bahru in the 1969 map (and numerous revised editions released in the following years) roughly corresponds to the modern-day Upper Boon Keng Road. By 1975, Geylang Bahru, the current road was completed.

== History ==
Kolam Ayer roughly covers the modern-day subzones of Geylang Bahru and Kallang Way, part of the Kallang and Geylang planning areas respectively.

Before the development of Kallang, Kolam Ayer (as it was known at the time) had numerous Malay kampongs. The precinct was mainly served by a main road called Jalan Kolam Ayer before the 1960s. This road was eventually merged to form part of the present-day Pan Island Expressway (PIE).

During the dredging of the Kallang River in the late 1960s and early 1970s, (Note: The history of the "Kallang River". Archived from the original on 2 March 2016. by the National Heritage Board) the Singapore government filled and leveled up the surrounding riverside with red mud that was carried by trucks from a nearby hill called Ang Chiang San (modern-day Toa Payoh). These areas formed what are today Bendemeer, Kallang Bahru and the old Geylang Bahru estate. (Note: Tan Khoon Yong (Chinese: 陈军荣) (2001). "二：五龙汇星洲之【南龙】". 新加坡地形风水：五龙汇星洲 (in Chinese (Singapore)) (Reprint ed.). Singapore: Times Books International. p. 207. ISBN 981232061X.)

Kolam Ayer

Chinese name
- Simplified Chinese: 哥南亚逸
Transcriptions
Standard Mandarin
- Hanyu Pinyin: Gēnán Yàyì
Yue: Cantonese
- Jyutping: go1 naam3 ngaa3 jat6
Southern Min
- Hokkien POJ: Ko-lām A-ıt

Malay name
- Malay: Kolam Ayer

Tamil name
- Tamil: கோலம் ஆயெர்

Since then, the precinct was connected with the Kolam Ayer Community Club and the People's Action Party Kolam Ayer Branch. (Note: The "Kolam Ayer Community". page (SNS) published by Dr. Yaacob and his team)

After the 1980s, the Jalan Besar Town Council relocated its office in Kallang Bahru. It was later renamed Moulmein-Kallang between 2011 and 2015 after the redrawing of GRC boundaries. (Note: The "Jalan Besar Town Council". official website) The old name was then restored following the 2015 general elections.

In April 2008, the Kolam Ayer ABC Waterfront was officially opened to the public as the first project under the Active, Beautiful, Clean Waters programme handled by Public Utilities Board. (Note: The "Active, Beautiful, Clean Waters". (ABC Waters) main page by the Public Utilities Board) (Note: The "Kolam Ayer ABC Waterfront". Archived from the original on 11 December 2015. introduction with a map by the Public Utilities Board)
