= MacPherson MRT station =

Mass Rapid Transit station in Singapore

MacPherson CC10 DT26 麦波申 மெக்பர்சன்
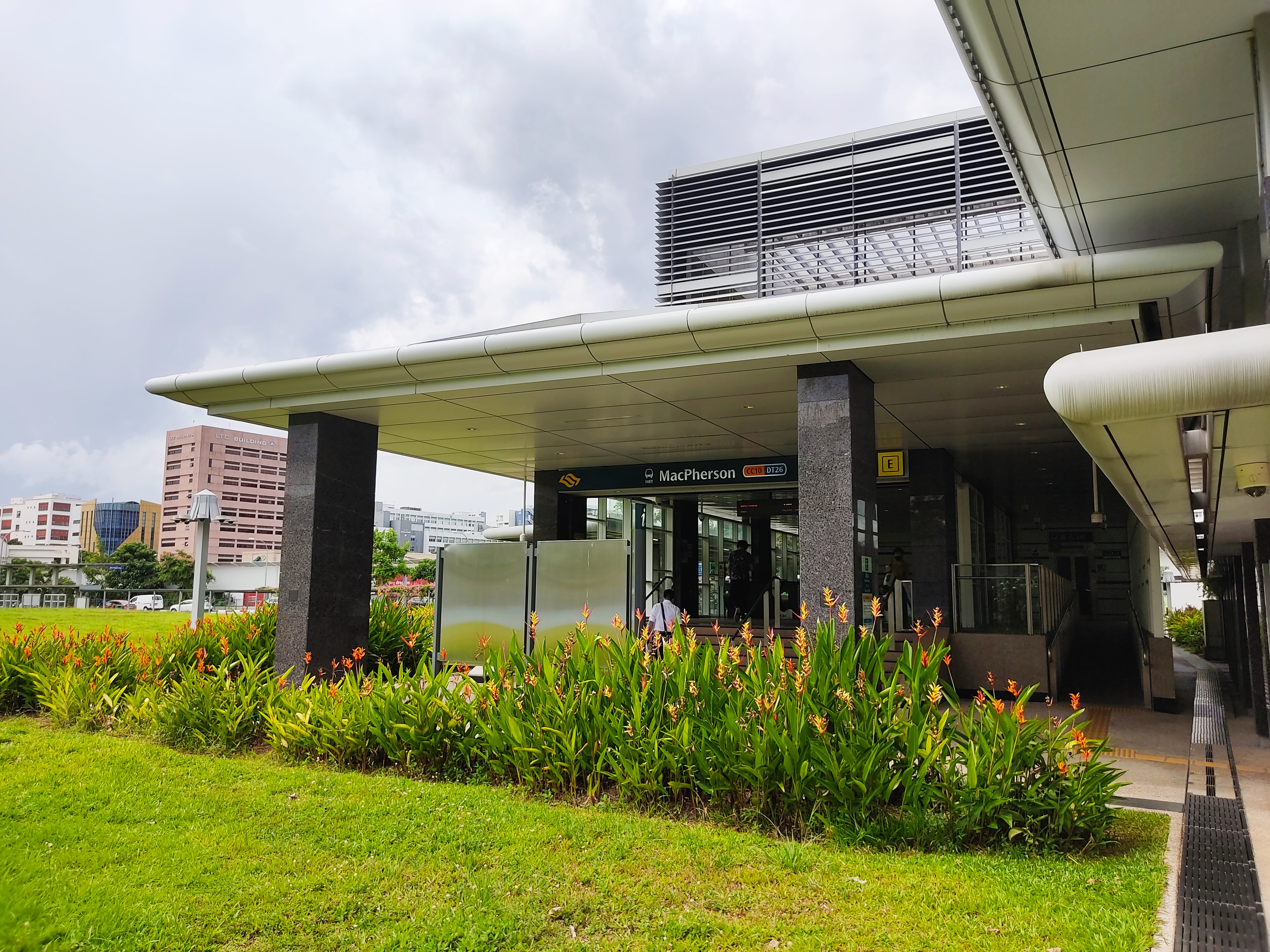
- Exit E of MacPherson station

General information
- Location: 171 Paya Lebar Road, Singapore 409048 (CCL); 10 Circuit Link, Singapore 378956 (DTL)
- Coordinates: 01°19′36″N 103°53′24″E
- System: Mass Rapid Transit (MRT) interchange
- Owner: Land Transport Authority
- Operator: SMRT Trains (Circle Line); SBS Transit (Downtown Line)
- Line: Circle Line Downtown Line
- Platforms: 4 (1 island platform, 2 side platforms)
- Tracks: 4
- Connections: Bus, Taxi

Construction
- Structure type: Underground
- Platform levels: 2
- Accessible: Yes

Other information
- Station code: MPS

History
- Opened: 17 April 2010; 16 years ago (Circle Line); 21 October 2017; 9 years ago (Downtown Line)
- Former names: Ubi

Passengers
- June 2024: 15,026 per day

Services
Preceding station	Mass Rapid Transit	Following station
Paya Lebar Clockwise	Circle Line	Tai Seng Anticlockwise
Paya Lebar towards Dhoby Ghaut	Circle Line	Tai Seng towards Prince Edward Road
Mattar towards Bukit Panjang	Downtown Line	Ubi towards Expo
Track layout
Location
- Location within Singapore Rail central area

MacPherson MRT station is an underground Mass Rapid Transit (MRT) interchange station on the Downtown Line and Circle Line in Geylang planning area, Singapore, located underneath Paya Lebar Road at the junction with Circuit Link and Ubi Avenue 2.

Named after the nearby MacPherson estate, which itself was named after Colonel Ronald MacPherson, the first Colonial Secretary of the Straits Settlements in 1867, this station serves not only the residents of MacPherson estate but also the Ubi industrial estate.

== History ==
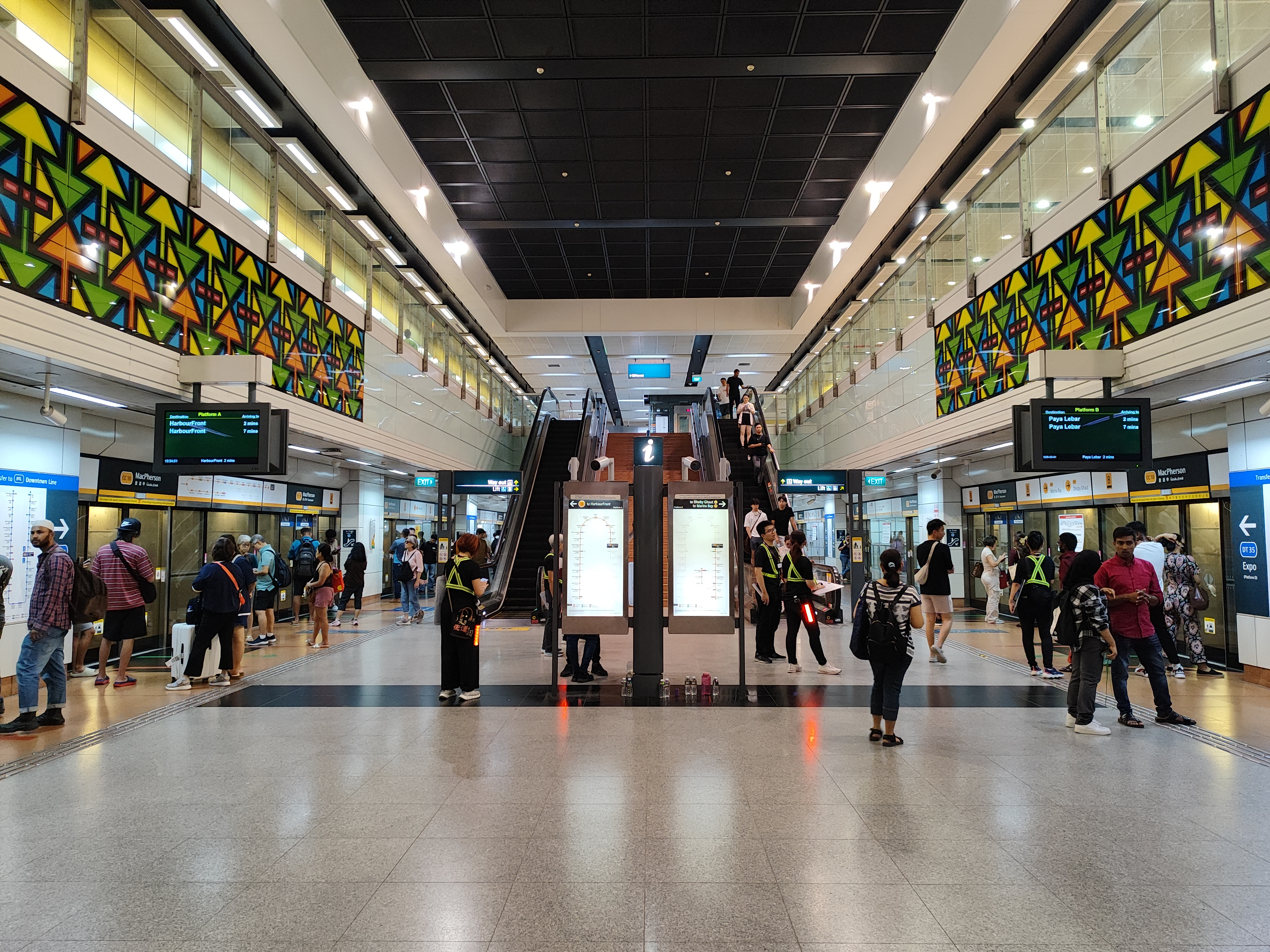
Circle Line platform level of MacPherson station.

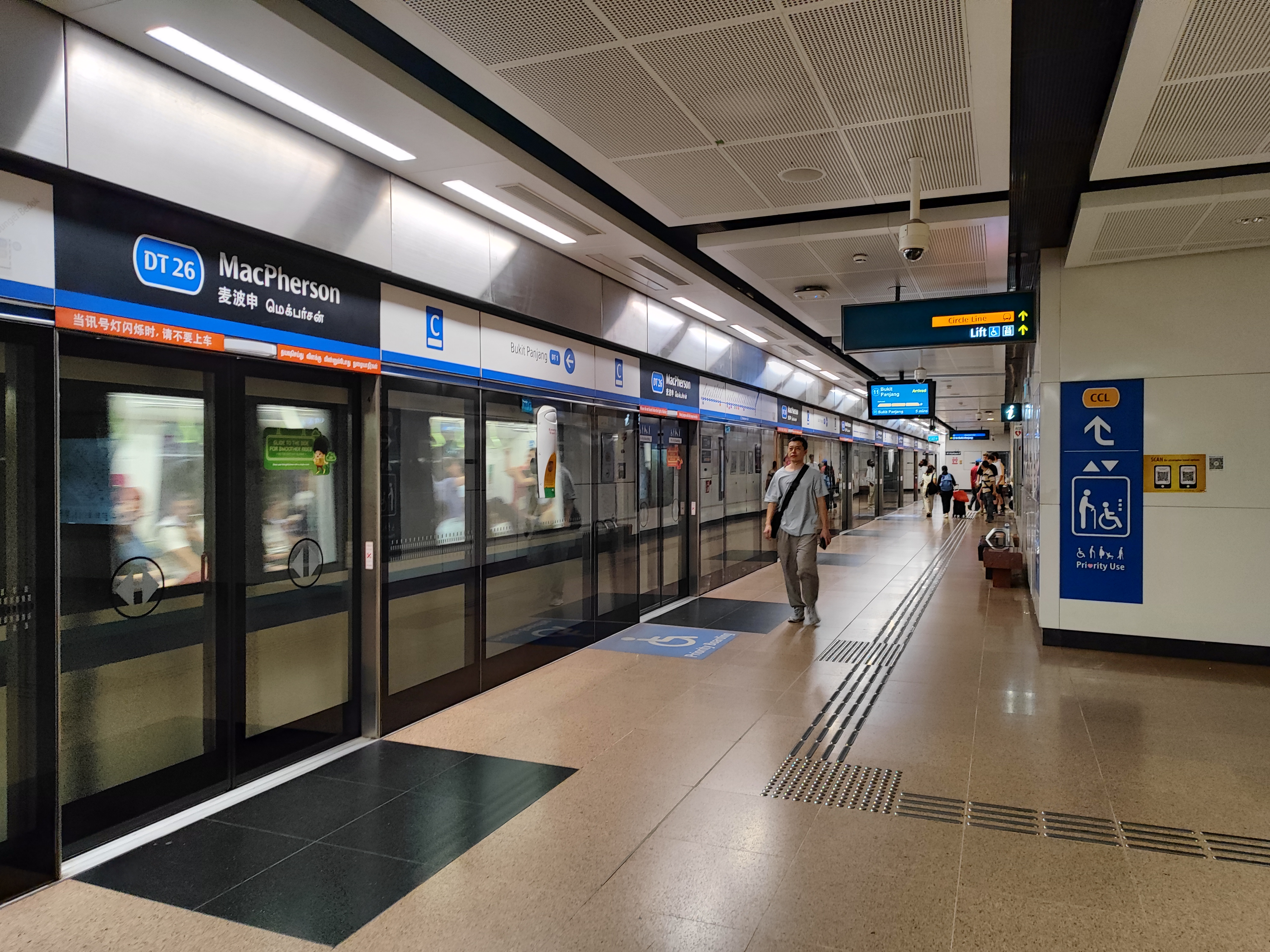
Downtown Line platform of MacPherson station

Contract 822 for the construction of CCL MacPherson station was awarded to Econ Corporation Ltd - NCC International AB Joint Venture at a contract sum of more than S$300 million. However, in 2005, Econ Corporation later dropped out due to financial difficulties, and LTA had sought to replace the contractors involved due to 'major outstanding works' on the two stations. To facilitate the construction for the CCL station, part of Paya Lebar Road, Circuit Link and Ubi Avenue 2 had to be realigned. In September 2007, Chye Joo Construction won the tender to finish building the MacPherson and Tai Seng MRT stations at a contract sum of S$17.5 million.

The station was opened on 17 April 2010 along with the rest of Stage 1 & 2 of the Circle Line.

=== Downtown Line interchange ===
During the CCL station's construction, provisions were made for MacPherson station to link with the planned Eastern Region Line, the precursor to Stage 3 of the DTL. Contract 931 for the design and construction of DTL MacPherson station and associated tunnels was awarded to Sato Kogyo (S) Pte Ltd at a sum of S$188 million in April 2011. Construction of the station and the tunnels commenced in the second quarter of that year and completed in 2017.

The station became an interchange with the Downtown Line when Stage 3 of the line opened on 21 October 2017, as announced by the Land Transport Authority (LTA) on 31 May that year.

== Civil Defence Shelter ==
MacPherson station is one of eleven stations along the Circle Line designated as Civil Defence (CD) shelters, which will be activated in times of national emergency. Apart from reinforced construction, the stations are designed and equipped with facilities to ensure the shelter environment is tolerable for all users during shelter occupation. These facilities include protective blast doors, decontamination facilities, ventilation systems, power and water supply systems and a dry toilet system.
