= Geylang Bahru MRT station =

Mass Rapid Transit station in Singapore

Geylang Bahru DT24 芽笼峇鲁 கேலாங் பாரு
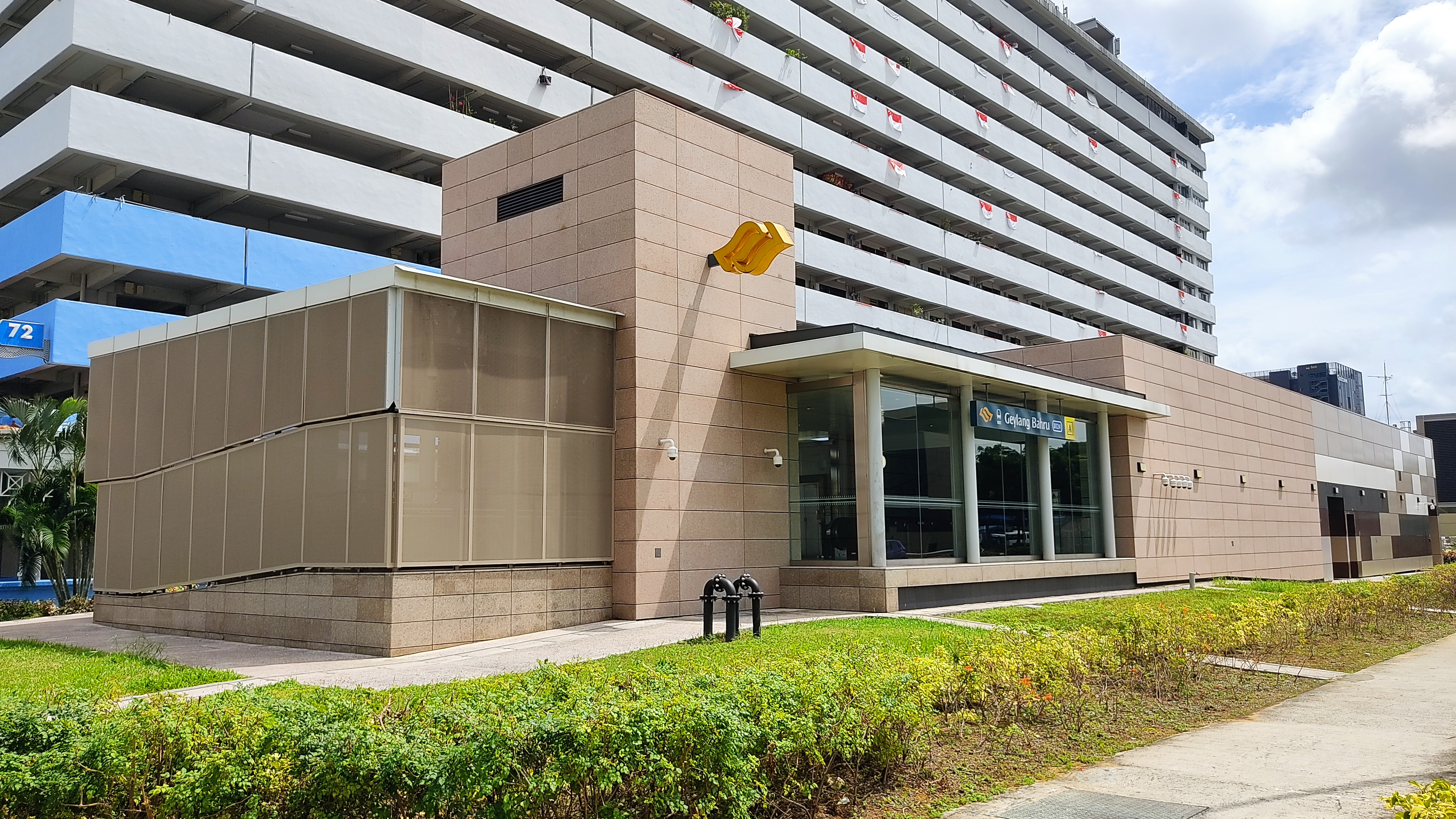
- Exit A of Geylang Bahru station

General information
- Location: 541 Kallang Bahru, Singapore 339355
- Coordinates: 01°19′17″N 103°52′17″E
- System: Mass Rapid Transit (MRT) station
- Owner: Land Transport Authority
- Operator: SBS Transit
- Line: Downtown Line
- Platforms: 2 (1 island platform)
- Tracks: 2
- Connections: Bus, Taxi

Construction
- Structure type: Underground
- Platform levels: 1
- Accessible: Yes

Other information
- Station code: GLB

History
- Opened: 21 October 2017; 9 years ago
- Former names: Kallang Bahru, Kolam Ayer

Passengers
- June 2024: 5,134 per day

Services
Preceding station	Mass Rapid Transit	Following station
Bendemeer towards Bukit Panjang	Downtown Line	Mattar towards Expo
Track layout
Location
- Location within Singapore Rail central area

Geylang Bahru MRT station is an underground Mass Rapid Transit (MRT) station on the Downtown Line in Kallang, Singapore.

The station is located under Kallang Bahru, at the junction with Geylang Bahru, hence its name. Nearby developments are largely residential. The Kallang Basin Swimming Complex and Kallang MRT station are located near to this station.

== History ==
The station was first announced as Kallang Bahru station on 20 August 2010 when the 16 stations of the 21-kilometre (13-mile) Downtown Line Stage 3 (DTL3) from the River Valley (now Fort Canning) to Expo stations were unveiled. The line was expected to be completed in 2017. Contract 932A for the construction of Kallang Bahru station was awarded to China State Construction Engineering Corporation Limited at a sum of S$123 million (US$97.79 million) in June 2011. Construction of the station and the tunnels commenced in July that year and was targeted to be completed in 2017.

The station opened on 21 October 2017, as announced by the Land Transport Authority on 31 May that year.

== Station details ==
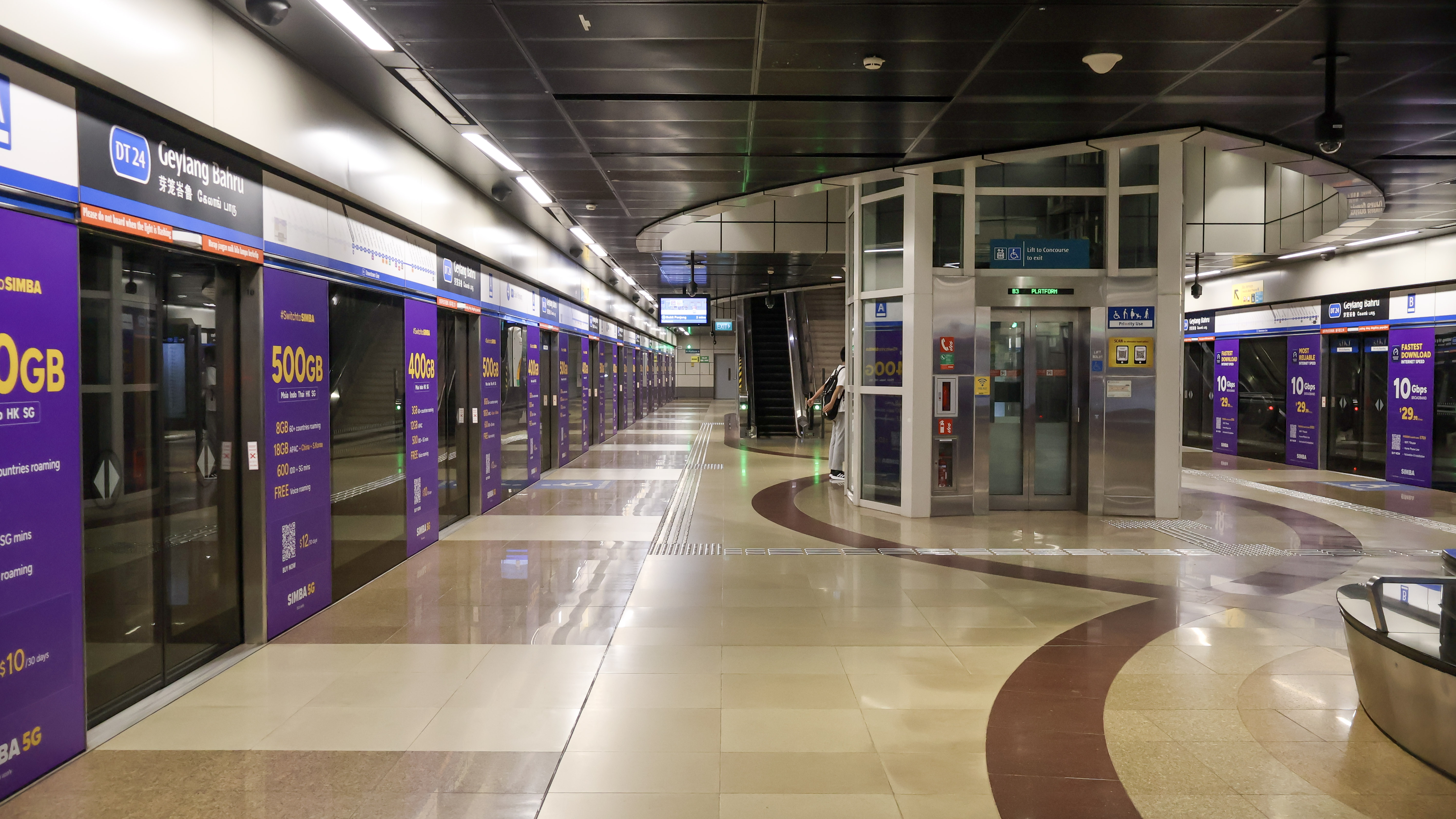
Platform level of Geylang Bahru station

=== Design and artwork ===
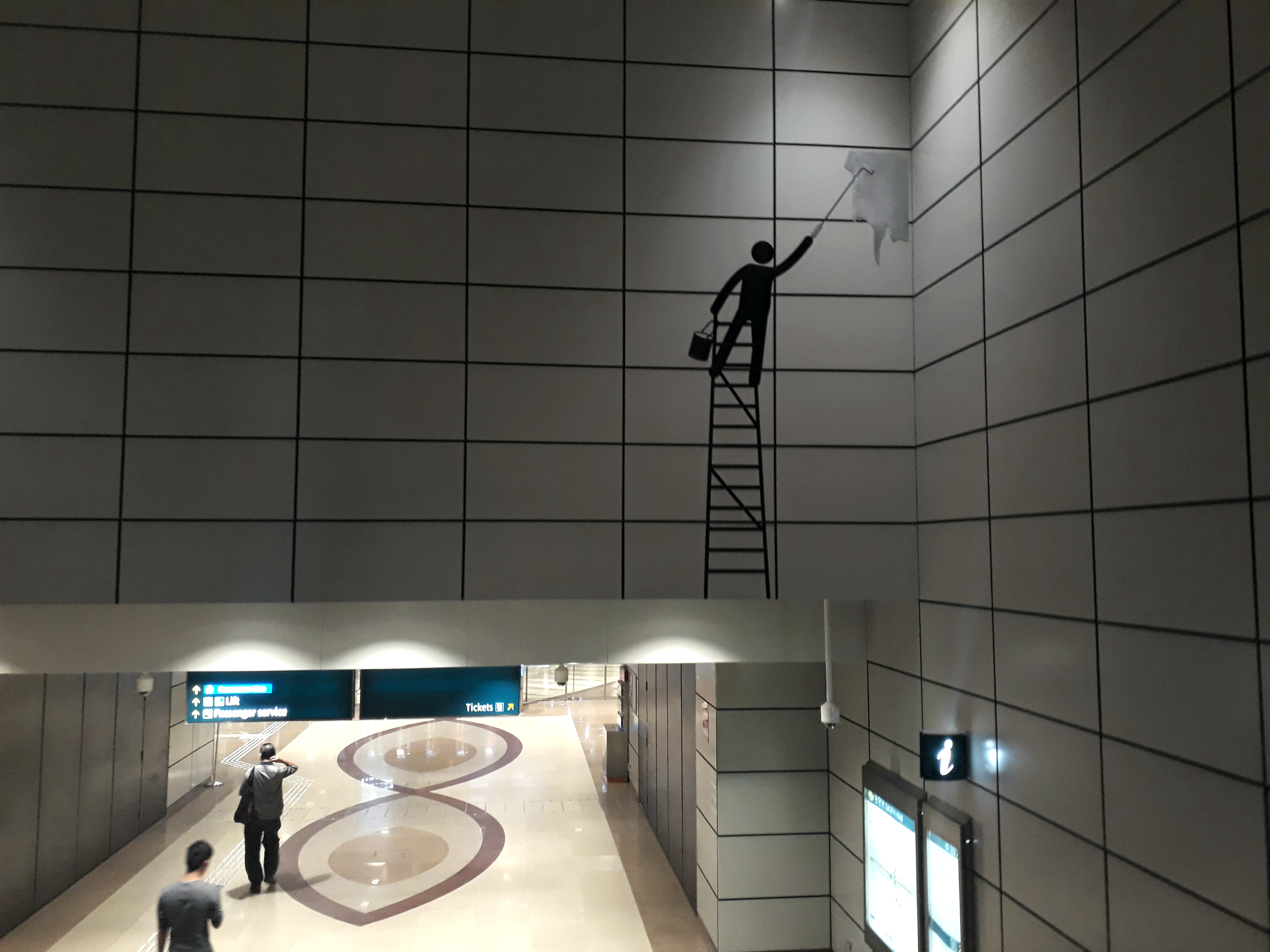
An artwork of a painter at the MRT station.

The station's internal area features a design resembling a leaf. Artworks portraying objects from day-to-day activities are also placed all over the station, and are part of an installation called Constructed Memories, by Marianne Yang.

=== Facilities in the vicinity ===
The station is located near to Kallang Basin Swimming Complex, Kallang Basin Industrial Estate, Kallang station and Lorong 1 Geylang Bus Terminal.
