= Bendemeer MRT station =

Mass Rapid Transit station in Singapore

Bendemeer DT23 明地迷亚 பெண்டிமியர்
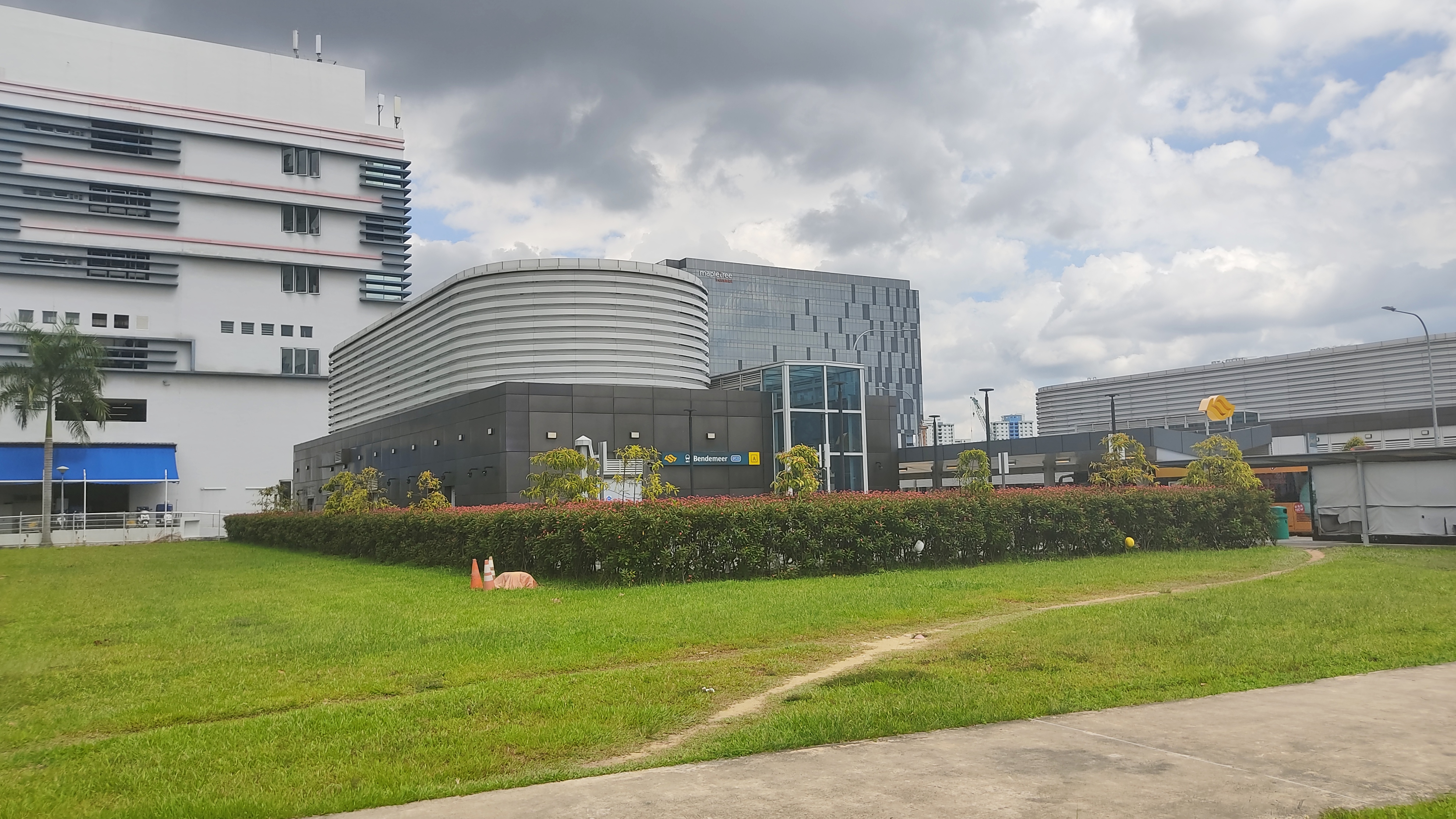
- Exit A of Bendemeer station

General information
- Location: 11 Kallang Bahru, Singapore 339356
- Coordinates: 01°18′49″N 103°51′47″E
- System: Mass Rapid Transit (MRT) station
- Owner: Land Transport Authority
- Operator: SBS Transit
- Line: Downtown Line
- Platforms: 2 (1 island platform)
- Tracks: 2
- Connections: Bus, Taxi

Construction
- Structure type: Underground
- Platform levels: 1
- Accessible: Yes

Other information
- Station code: BDM

History
- Opened: 21 October 2017; 9 years ago
- Former names: Jalan Besar, Kallang Bahru

Passengers
- June 2024: 4,219 per day

Services
Preceding station	Mass Rapid Transit	Following station
Jalan Besar towards Bukit Panjang	Downtown Line	Geylang Bahru towards Expo
Track layout
Location
- Location within Singapore Rail central area

Bendemeer MRT station is an underground Mass Rapid Transit (MRT) station on the Downtown Line in East of Rochor, Singapore.

Despite its name, the station is not located under Bendemeer Road, but under Kallang Bahru. This station serves the commercial developments around Lavender Street and the industrial estates along Kallang Avenue. The famous Jalan Besar Stadium, Lavender MRT station and Boon Keng MRT station are in close proximity.

== History ==
The station was first announced as Jalan Besar station on 20 August 2010 when the 16 stations of the 21-kilometre (13-mile) Downtown Line Stage 3 (DTL3) from the River Valley (now Fort Canning) to Expo stations were unveiled. The line was expected to be completed in 2017. Contract 933 for the construction of Bendeemer station and associated tunnels was awarded to Penta-Ocean Construction Co. Ltd. at a contract sum of S$215.24 million (US$171.13 million) million in August 2011. Construction was scheduled to start in September that year and targeted to be completed by 2017.

The twin 2.25 km tunnels between Jalan Besar, Bendemeer and Geylang Bahru stations were bored under old pre-war shophouses along Jalan Besar Road and required careful and stringent control of the tunnelling works beneath it. The tunnels were constructed using steel-fibre reinforced concrete (SFRC) segments, the first in South East Asia, which enhances the long term durability of the tunnels.

The station opened on 21 October 2017, as announced by the Land Transport Authority on 31 May that year.

== Gallery ==
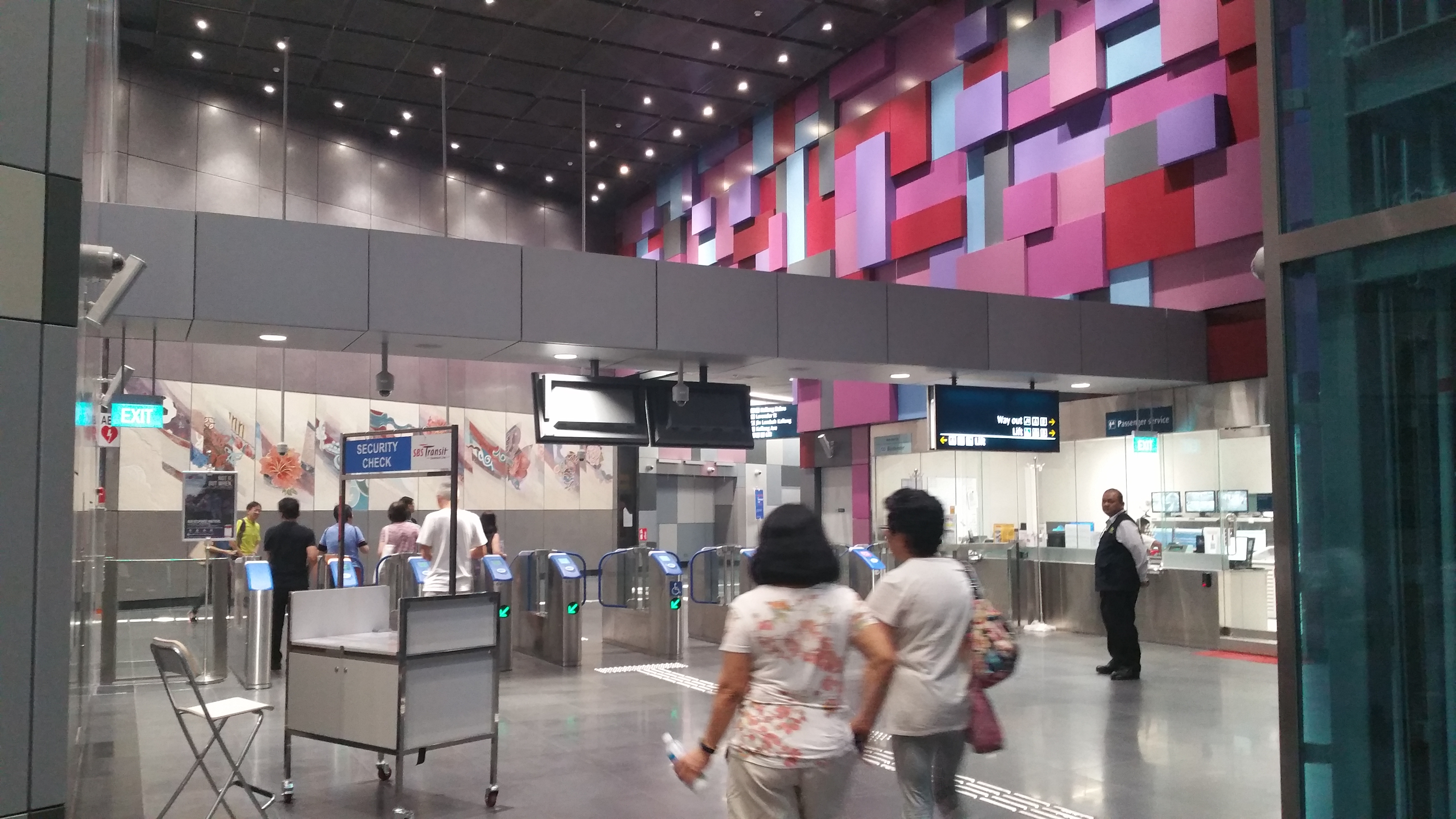
Concourse level

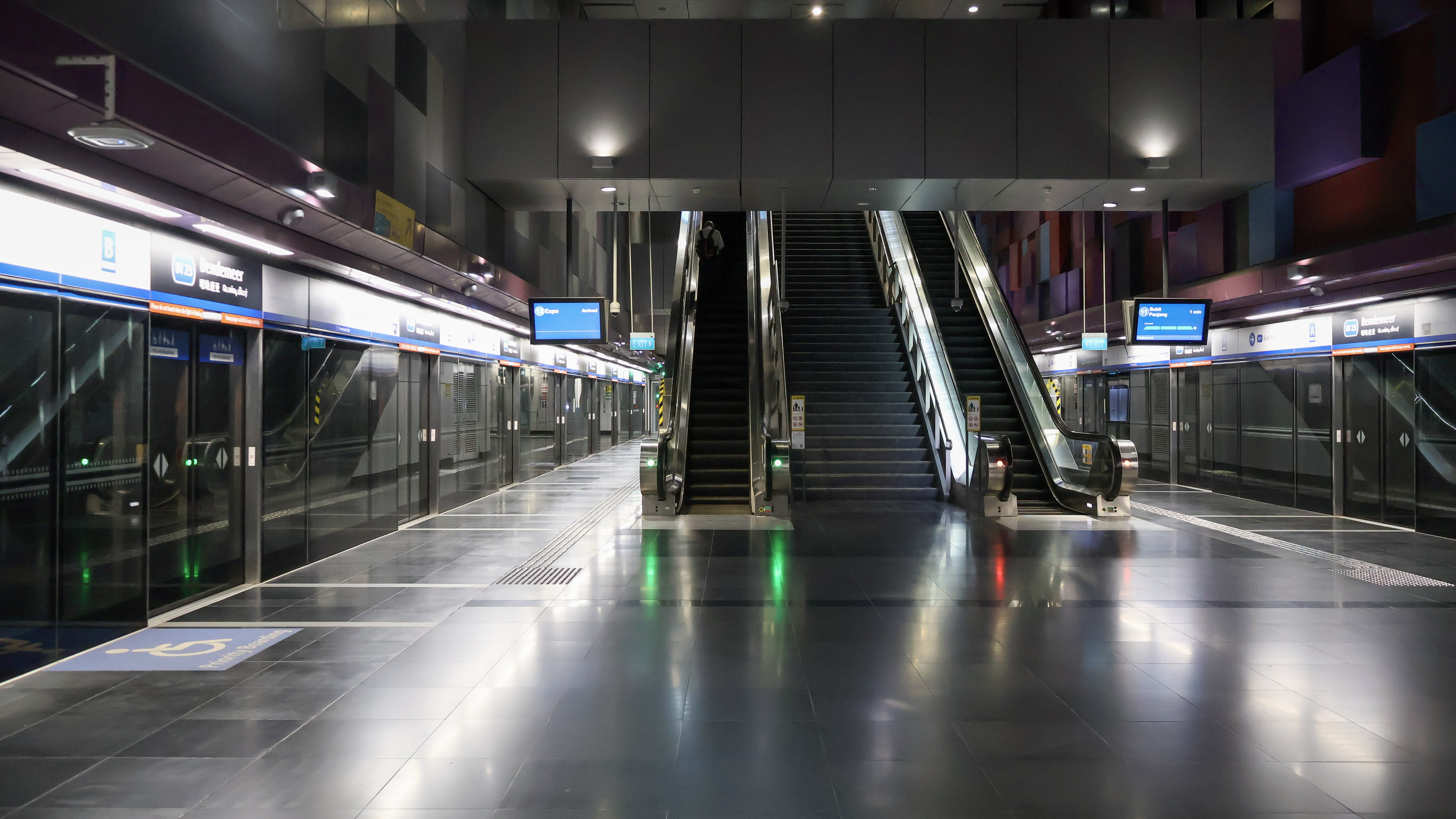
Platform level
