= Jalan Besar MRT station =

Mass Rapid Transit station in Singapore

Jalan Besar DT22 惹兰勿刹 ஜாலான் புசார்
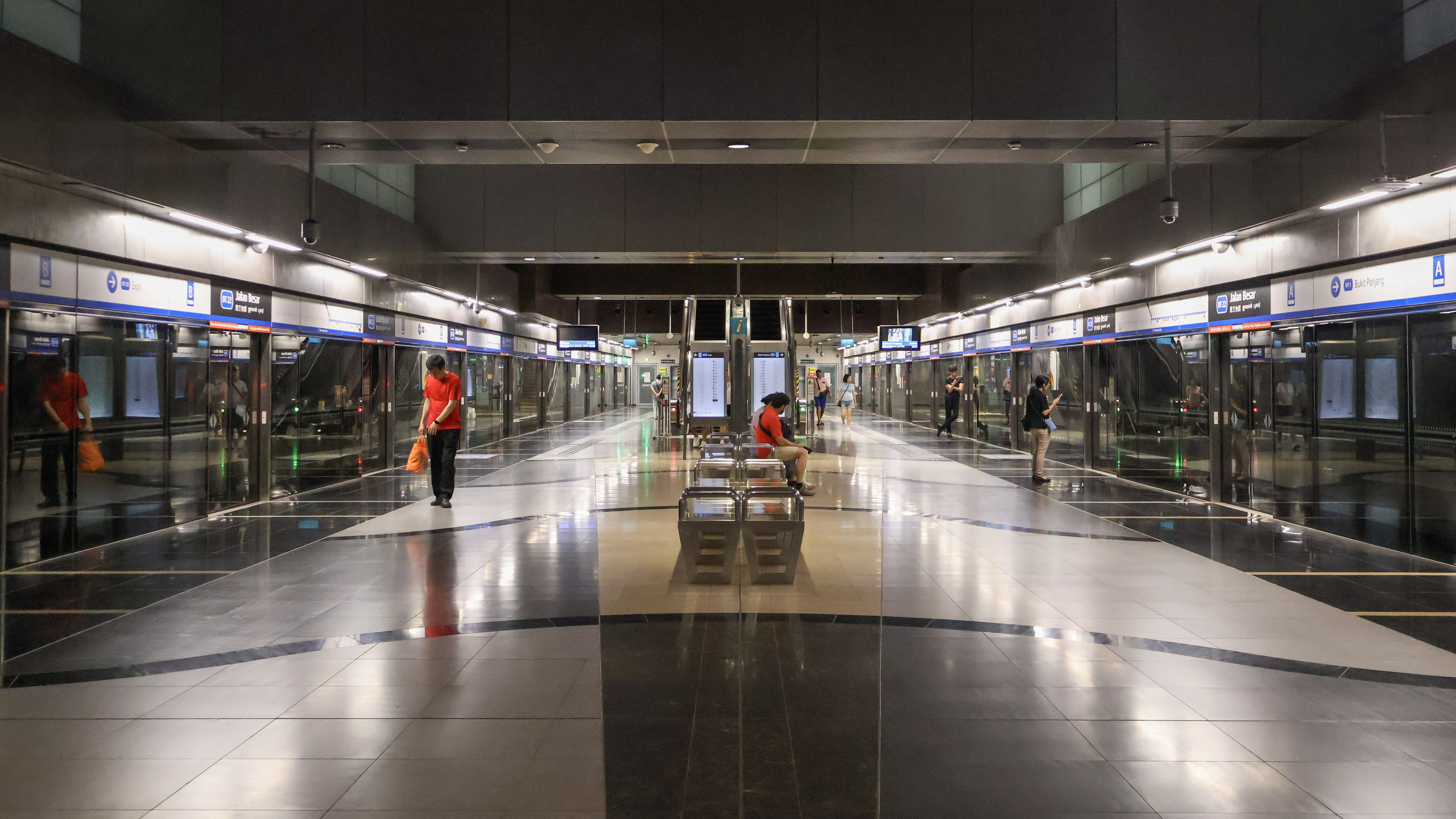
- Platform level of Jalan Besar station

General information
- Location: 90 Jalan Besar, Singapore 208826
- Coordinates: 01°18′20″N 103°51′19″E
- System: Mass Rapid Transit (MRT) station
- Owner: Land Transport Authority
- Operator: SBS Transit
- Line: Downtown Line
- Platforms: 2 (1 island platform)
- Tracks: 2
- Connections: DT13 Rochor; Bus, Taxi

Construction
- Structure type: Underground
- Platform levels: 1
- Accessible: Yes

Other information
- Station code: JLB

History
- Opened: 21 October 2017; 9 years ago
- Former names: Sungei Road

Passengers
- June 2024: 9,291 per day

Services
Preceding station	Mass Rapid Transit	Following station
Bencoolen towards Bukit Panjang	Downtown Line	Bendemeer towards Expo
Track layout
Location
- Location within Singapore Rail central area

Jalan Besar MRT station is an underground Mass Rapid Transit station on the Downtown Line in Rochor, Singapore. The station is located under Jalan Besar, at the junction with Weld Road, hence its name.

The station was first announced as Sungei Road MRT station in August 2010. The former Sungei Road Thieves' Market was located next to this station. Jalan Besar station is within walking distance of Rochor MRT station and Bugis MRT station.

== History ==
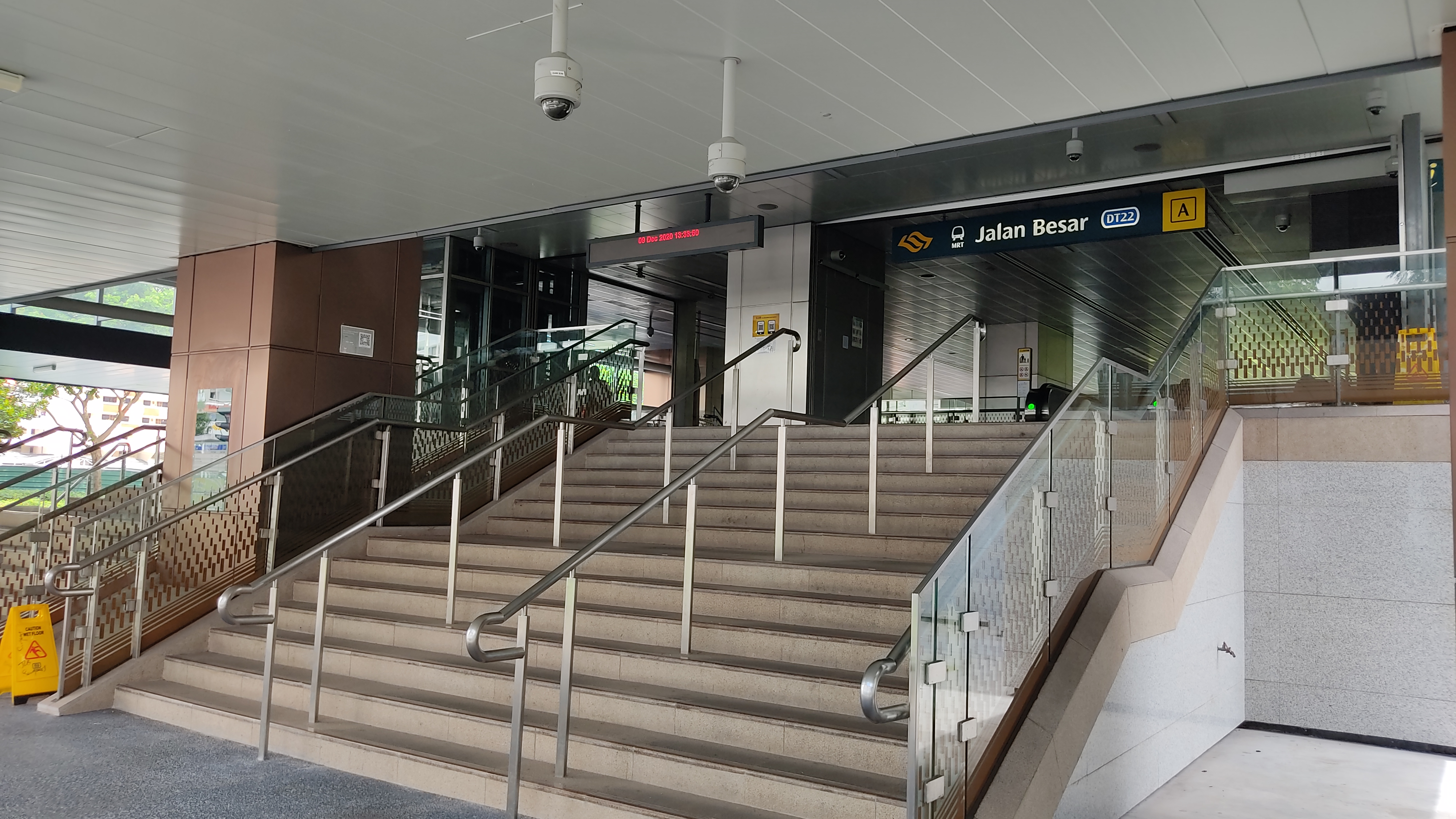
Exit A of the station

The station was first announced as Sungei Road station on 20 August 2010 when the 16 stations of the 21-kilometre (13-mile) Downtown Line Stage 3 (DTL3) from the River Valley (now Fort Canning) to Expo stations were unveiled. The station was the latest addition to the initial plans for the DTL3. The line was expected to be completed in 2017. Contract 935 for the construction and completion of Sungei Road station was awarded to Leighton Offshore Pte Ltd - John Holland Pty Ltd (Singapore Branch) Joint Venture at a sum of S$171.46 million (US$136.32 million) in May 2011. Construction of the station and the tunnels commenced in June that year and was targeted to be completed in 2017.

The construction had begun in July 2011 when the Pasar Lane and Pitt Street was closed to make way for Downtown Line with the road realigned on 6 April 2012. After Downtown Line Stage 3 was completed, construction began on two new HDB flats, River Peaks I and II.

On 31 May 2017, the Land Transport Authority (LTA) announced that the station, together with the rest of DTL3, will be opened on 21 October that year. Passengers were offered a preview of the station along with the other Downtown Line 3 (DTL 3) stations at the DTL 3 Open House on 15 October.

== Details ==
The station is located in close proximity to Rochor MRT station. Since March 2018, passengers can transfer between the two stations without a fare penalty, therefore skipping the loop of the Downtown Line.
