= Kallang Bahru =

- Subzone of Kallang Planning Area

Other transcription(s)
  - Malay: Kallang Bahru (Rumi) کالڠ بهرو (Jawi)
  - Chinese: 加冷峇鲁 (Simplified) 加冷峇魯 (Traditional); Jiālěng Bālǔ (Pinyin); Ka-léng Bā-ló͘ (Hokkien POJ); Gā-láahng Bā-lóuh (Cantonese Yale)
  - Tamil: காலாங் பாரு Kālāṅ pāru (Transliteration)
- Interactive map of Kallang Bahru
- Coordinates: 1.3179°N 103.8644°E
- Country: Singapore
- Region: Central Region
- Planning Area: Kallang

Area
  - Total: 0.84 km^{2} (0.32 sq mi)

Population (2015)
  - Total: 30,000
  - Density: 36,000/km^{2} (92,000/sq mi)

Kallang Bahru is a subzone within the planning area of Kallang, Singapore, as defined by the Urban Redevelopment Authority (URA). This subzone is bounded by Bendemeer Road and Sungei Whampoa in the north; the Kallang River in the east; Kallang Road and Sims Avenue in the south; and Lavender Street in the west.

"Kallang Bahru" is also the name of a two-way road in the area. This road connects the Pan Island Expressway (PIE) in the northeast with Lavender Street in the southwest, with major junctions located at Geylang Bahru and Boon Keng Road. This road is unique as it is one of the few roads in Singapore to have a name without any generic element. The name of the subzone was derived from this road.

The subzone of Kallang Bahru consists mostly of industrial and office developments. Notable places include the Kallang Delivery Base of Singapore Post, Aperia Mall and Victoria Wholesale Centre. Bendemeer MRT station along the Downtown Line is located within this subzone.

== History ==
The name "Kallang Bahru" first appeared in a street directory as a proposed road in 1969. Meaning "New Kallang" in the Malay language, the road and its surrounding area were seen as an extension of the Kallang settlement. Prior to the construction of the road, the area was a swampland.

== See also ==
- Kallang
- Bendemeer MRT station
- Geylang Bahru
- Geylang Bahru MRT station (construction alias: Kallang Bahru)
