= Mattar MRT station =

Mass Rapid Transit station in Singapore

Mattar DT25 玛达 மாத்தார்
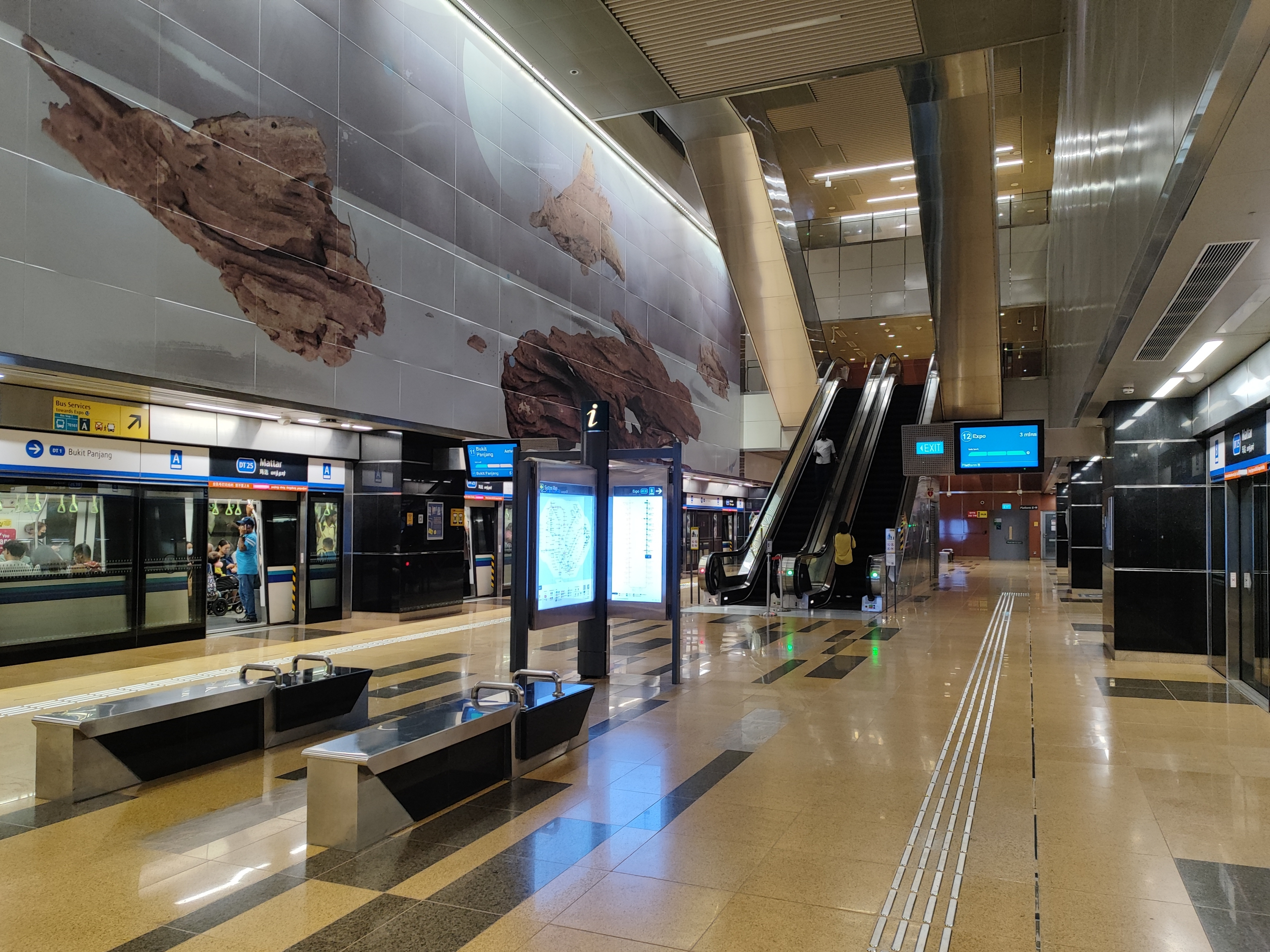
- Platform level of Mattar station

General information
- Location: 60 Merpati Road, Singapore 379314
- Coordinates: 01°19′38″N 103°52′58″E
- System: Mass Rapid Transit (MRT) station
- Owner: Land Transport Authority
- Operator: SBS Transit
- Line: Downtown Line
- Platforms: 2 (1 island platform)
- Tracks: 4 (including a track siding for each platform)
- Connections: Bus, Taxi

Construction
- Structure type: Underground
- Platform levels: 1
- Accessible: Yes

Other information
- Station code: MTR

History
- Opened: 21 October 2017; 9 years ago
- Former names: Merpati

Passengers
- June 2024: 4,050 per day

Services
Preceding station	Mass Rapid Transit	Following station
Geylang Bahru towards Bukit Panjang	Downtown Line	MacPherson towards Expo
Track layout
Location
- Location within Singapore Rail central area

Mattar MRT station (IPA: /ˈmɑːtɑːr/ MAH-tar) is an underground Mass Rapid Transit (MRT) station on the Downtown Line (DTL) in Geylang, Singapore. The station is located underneath Mattar Road near the junction of Merpati Road. Surrounding landmarks of the station include Canossa Convent, Masjid Sallim Mattar, Church of St Stephen, and Circuit Road Food Centre. The station is operated by SBS Transit.

The station was announced in August 2010 when the DTL Stage 3 stations were revealed, and station operations began on 21 October 2017. Designed by ONG & ONG, Mattar station features a public artwork, Agar Panel by Genevieve Chua.

== History ==
The station was first announced on 20 August 2010 when the 16 stations of the 21-kilometre (13-mile) Downtown Line Stage 3 (DTL3) from the River Valley (now Fort Canning) to Expo stations were unveiled. The line was expected to be completed in 2017. The station was built at the former carpark of Mattar Road which was cleared in the first phase of redevelopment works. The contract for the construction of Mattar station and associated tunnels was awarded to Sato Kogyo (S) Pte Ltd for S$199.85 million (US$158.89 million) in April 2011. Tunnelling works for the DTL3 officially began at a ceremony held at Mattar station on 11 July 2012.

On 31 May 2017, the Land Transport Authority (LTA) announced that the station would be opened on 21 October that year. Passengers were offered a preview of the station along with the other DTL3 stations at the DTL3 Open House on 15 October.

On the morning of 24 May 2024, a maintenance locomotive caught fire while works were carried out at Mattar Station. The tracks were closed from Fort Canning to Mattar as the Singapore Civil Defence Force put out the fire. Regular operations resumed at 7:16 am.

== Details ==
Mattar station serves the Downtown Line and is located between Geylang Bahru and MacPherson stations. The station code is DT25. Being part of the DTL, the station is operated by SBS Transit. Situation near the junction of Mattar Road and Merpati Road, this station has two entrances which serve various landmarks including Canossian School, Canossa Convent, Church of Saint Stephen, Masjid Sallim Mattar, and Circuit Road Food Centre.

Designed by ONG & ONG, the three shades of brown of the station entrances allude to the Mattar tree. (Note: Possibly a plant name of Malay origin, like how many other streets in the area are named after plants in the Malay language.) The interior also features an aluminium panel ceiling and staggered floor patterns. The station is wheelchair-accessible. A tactile system, consisting of tiles with rounded or elongated raised studs, guides visually impaired commuters through the station, with dedicated routes that connect the station entrances to the platforms or between the lines. Wider fare gates allow easier access for wheelchair users into the station.

=== Public artwork ===
The station features Agar Panel by Genevieve Chua as part of the MRT network's Art-in-Transit programme, a public art showcase which integrates artworks into the MRT network. The artwork depicts agarwood shavings interspersed with blue dots and white specks that seem to float above the platforms in a backdrop of grey and blue, creating a cosmic landscape while also symbolising the movement of commuters and trains. The title Agar Panel refers to the 133 vitreous enamel panels used and the scientific agar plate used in culturing microorganisms.

The work intends to depict Mattar's religious landscape composed of "tiny pieces accumulated over time". Agarwood has been used as incense in various religions and cultures due to its exquisite fragrance, and hence Chua photographed the pieces at a gemstone shop at Fortune Centre and transformed them into the grand landscape painting displayed over the platforms. Although unintentional, the agarwood pieces were seen by the Art Review Panel as resembling meteorites in a cosmic backdrop, a comparison embraced by Chua. Chua hoped the artwork would pique commuters' curiosity about its connection to Mattar, believing that engaging with the artwork often begins with a leap of faith.
