= Downtown Line =

Mass Rapid Transit line in Singapore

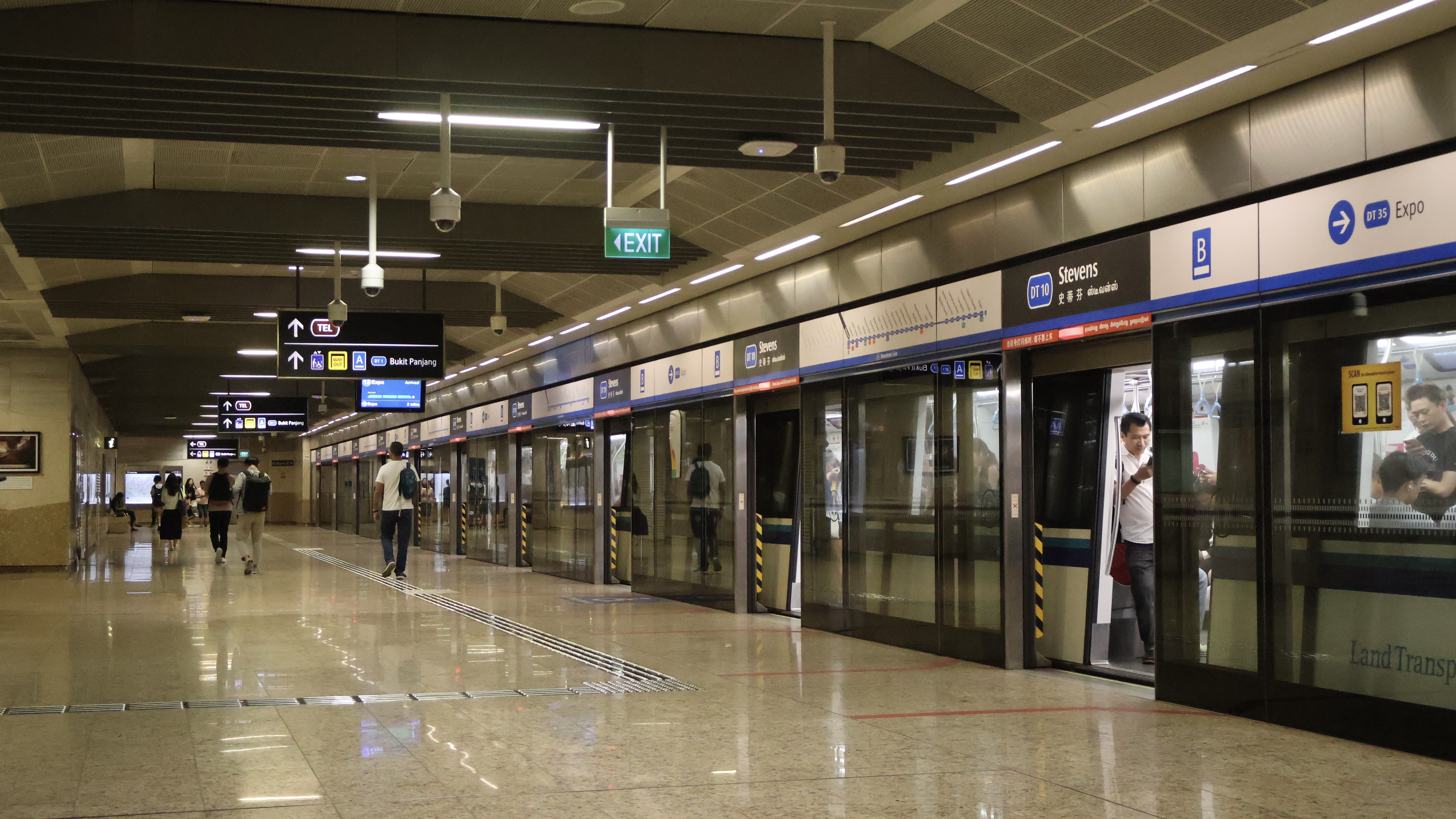
- A Bombardier Movia C951 train at Stevens station

Overview
- Native name: Malay: Laluan Pusat Bandar; Chinese: 滨海市区地铁线 (Note: pinyin: Bīnhǎi shìqū dìtiěxiàn); Tamil: டௌண்டவுன் ரயில் பாதை (Note: Romanisation: ṭauṇṭavuṉ rayil pātai)
- Status: Operational; Under testing (DTL3e); Under construction (DTL2e)
- Owner: Land Transport Authority
- Locale: Singapore
- Termini: Sungei Kadut (2035) Bukit Panjang; Expo Sungei Bedok (26 December 2026)
- Stations: 35 (operational); 2 (under construction); 2 (under testing)
- Colour on map: Blue (#005ec4)

Service
- Type: Rapid transit
- System: Mass Rapid Transit
- Services: 2
- Operator: SBS Transit DTL Pte Ltd (SBS Transit)
- Depot(s): Gali Batu; Tai Seng; East Coast (future)
- Rolling stock: Bombardier Movia C951(A)
- Daily ridership: 463,000 (June 2025)

History
- Planned opening: 26 December 2026; 34 days' time (DTL3e); 2035; 9 years' time (DTL2e)
- Opened: 22 December 2013; 12 years ago (DTL1); 27 December 2015; 10 years ago (DTL2); 21 October 2017; 9 years ago (DTL3); 28 February 2025; 20 months ago (Hume)

Technical
- Line length: 41.9 km (26.0 mi) (operational); 2.2 km (1.4 mi) (under testing); 4 km (2.5 mi) (under construction)
- Character: Fully underground
- Track gauge: 1,435 mm (4 ft 8 1/2 in) standard gauge
- Electrification: 750 V DC third rail
- Operating speed: Service limit: 80 km/h (50 mph)
Maps
Interactive Map

The Downtown Line (DTL) is a rail line on the Singapore Mass Rapid Transit (MRT) system. Operated by SBS Transit, the line runs from Bukit Panjang station in the north-west of the country towards Expo station in the east, while also making a loop around the city centre (Central Area). Coloured blue on the rail map, the DTL is the fifth MRT line on the network.

The DTL was initially conceived as three separate projects – the Bukit Timah Line, the northern half of the Eastern Region Line, and the Downtown Extension of the Circle Line. These projects were merged into the DTL in 2007, and construction began in three stages. Stage 1, which spans from Bugis to Chinatown, opened in 2013. Stage 2, which spans from Bugis to Bukit Panjang, commenced operations in 2015. This was despite the bankruptcy of Alpine Bau, which was the main contractor for three stations on the segment. Stage 3, which spans from Fort Canning to Expo, opened in 2017.

Hume, an infill station between Hillview and Beauty World, began operations in February 2025. A two-station extension to Sungei Bedok is under construction and scheduled to begin operations on 26 December 2026. Another two-station extension to connect with the North–South Line at Sungei Kadut is being planned and set to open in 2035.

The DTL is Singapore's longest automated MRT line at 41.9 kilometres (26.0 mi) and serves 35 underground stations. It uses the Siemens Trainguard Sirius communications-based train control (CBTC) moving block system. The Bombardier Movia C951 trains run on the medium-capacity line in a three-car formation. Thirty-three artworks are displayed on the line as part of the Art in Transit programme.

== History ==
=== Planning ===
Downtown Line progression map

At the opening ceremony for Dover station in October 2001, Singapore's Transport Minister Yeo Cheow Tong announced that the Singaporean government would proceed with three new rail projects: the Bukit Timah Line (BTL), the Eastern Region Line (ERL), and the Jurong Region Line. The BTL and the northern half of the ERL were subsequently incorporated into the Downtown Line (DTL). The BTL was planned to be a fully underground line serving Bukit Panjang, Upper Bukit Timah, and Bukit Timah to alleviate traffic congestion along the Bukit Timah and Dunearn Road corridor. The ERL was planned as a loop line to complement the East–West Line (EWL), serving residents of eastern Singapore, particularly Tampines, Bedok, Marine Parade, MacPherson and Kaki Bukit.

On 14 June 2005, the Land Transport Authority (LTA) announced plans for the Downtown Extension (DTE), which was intended to be a branch of the Circle Line (CCL). Comprising five stations from Millenia (now Promenade) to Chinatown, it would serve the development of the Downtown at Marina Bay, a planned business and financial hub. Yam Ah Mee, the then-chief executive of the LTA, also stated that the agency was studying further extensions to the DTE, including an eastward extension to Kim Chuan Depot and a westward link to the BTL.

The LTA's rail director Lim Bok Ngam told The Straits Times in March 2006 that LTA planners and engineers were assessing ground conditions and possible station locations for the BTL and ERL. The upper portion of the 40 km (25 mi) ERL – which would serve Jalan Besar, Bedok, and Tampines – was planned to be constructed first. During the Committee of Supply debate in 2007, Transport Minister Raymond Lim announced that the LTA was finalising feasibility studies for a new 33-station DTL, which would connect the eastern and north-western corridors to Marina Bay. Lim also announced that the DTE would be incorporated into the DTL.

Lim announced in April 2007 that the government would invest S$12 billion (US$8 billion) (Note: All currencies are converted to United States dollars using data from the International Monetary Fund published by the World Bank.) into the DTL. The line was planned to span 40 km (25 mi) and would be built in three stages with 33 stations. The project was expected to be completed by 2018. The DTE would be constructed as part of DTL Stage 1 (DTL1), a 4.3 km (2.7 mi) section from Chinatown to Bugis. Stage 2 (DTL2), which comprised the former BTL, would run 16.6 kilometres (10.3 mi) from Bukit Panjang to Bugis. Stage 3 (DTL3), which was the northern portion of the ERL, would span 19.1 kilometres (11.9 mi) from Chinatown to Expo station. The DTL was finalised as a medium-rail line with three-car trains, as LTA studies found that accommodating higher-capacity trains would increase project costs by 30%. The line was projected to serve about 500,000 commuters daily.

=== Construction ===
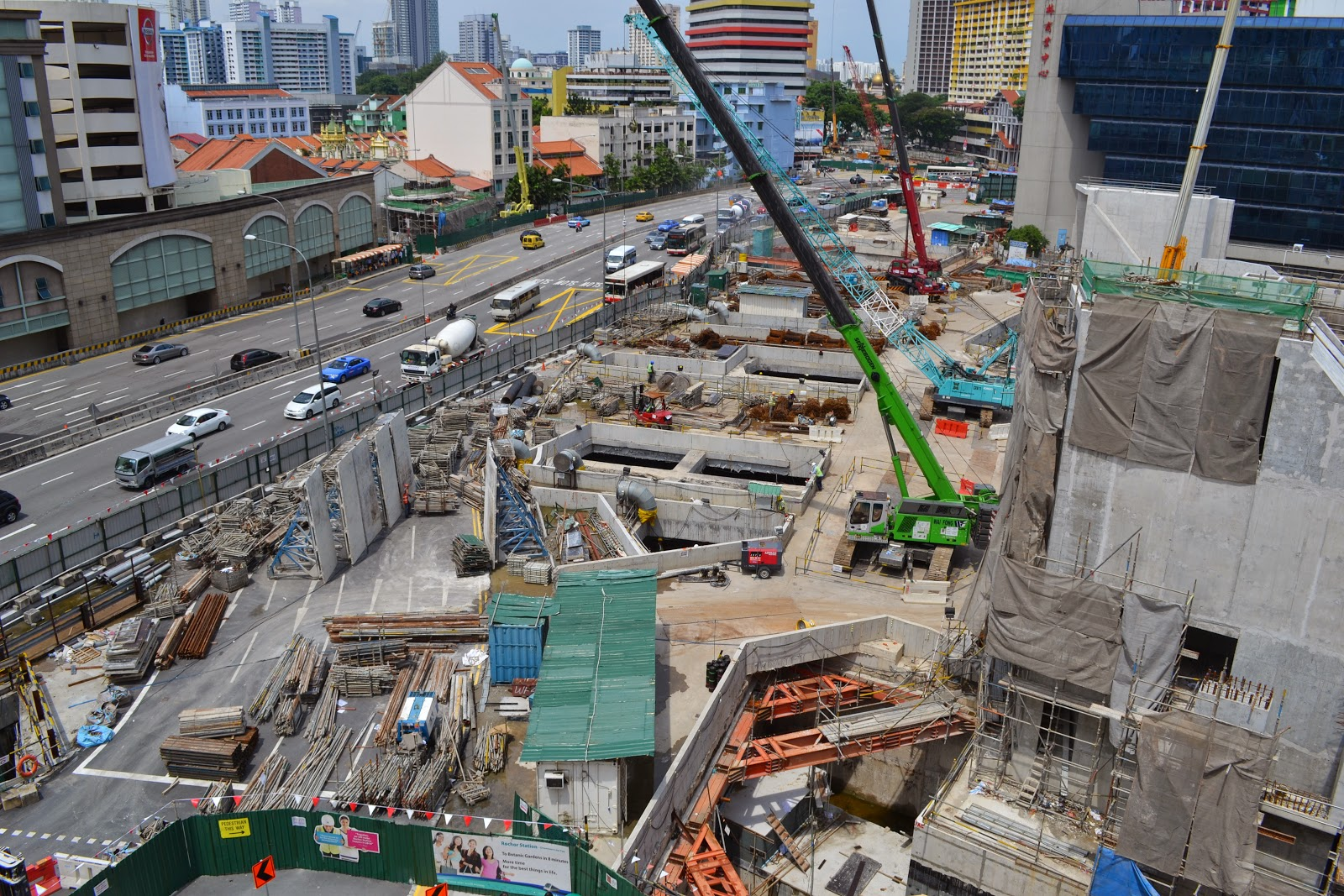
Construction site of Rochor in August 2014, which involved the diversion of the Rochor Canal

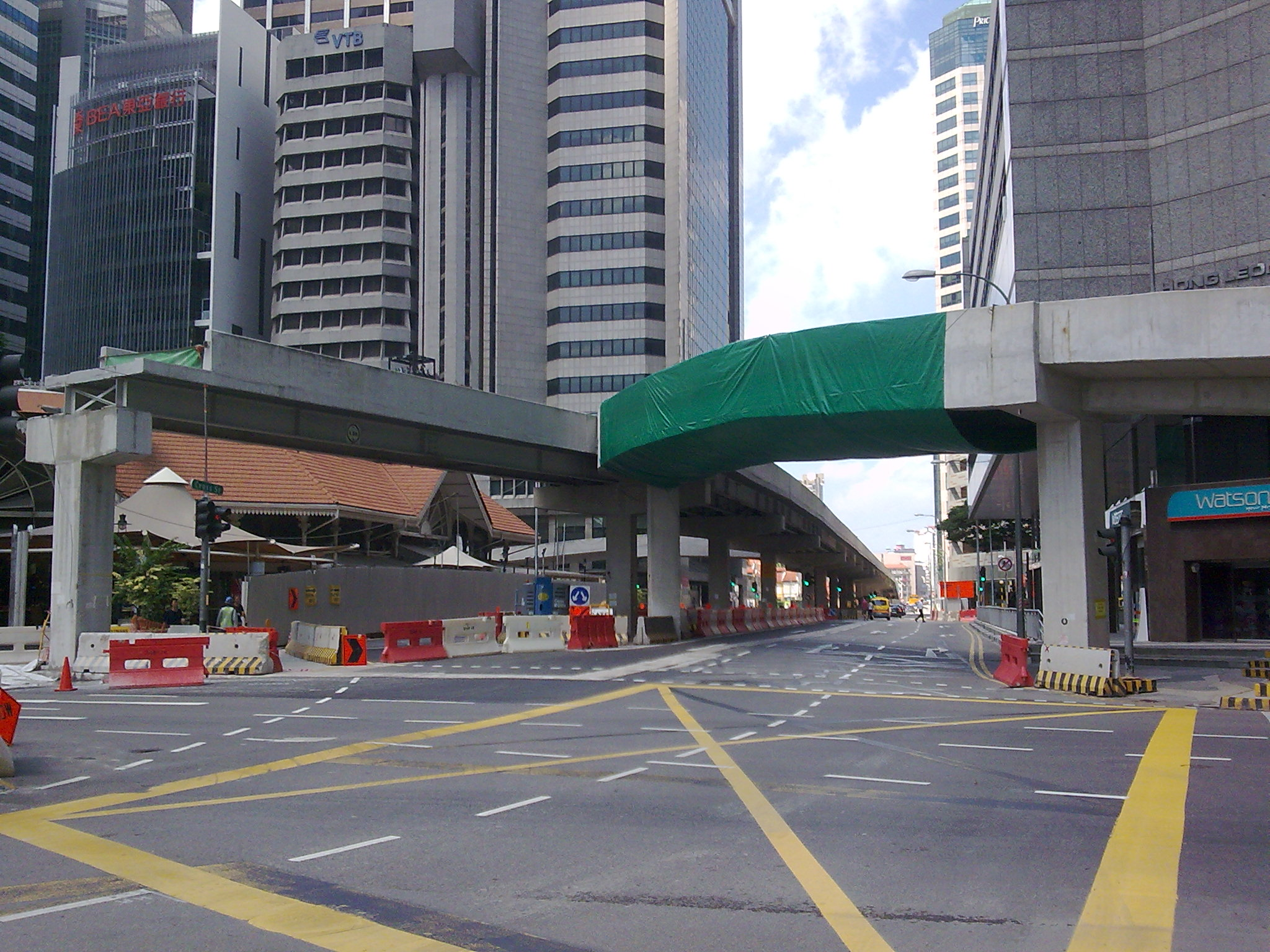
The temporary viaduct built at Cross Street for the construction of Telok Ayer in December 2010

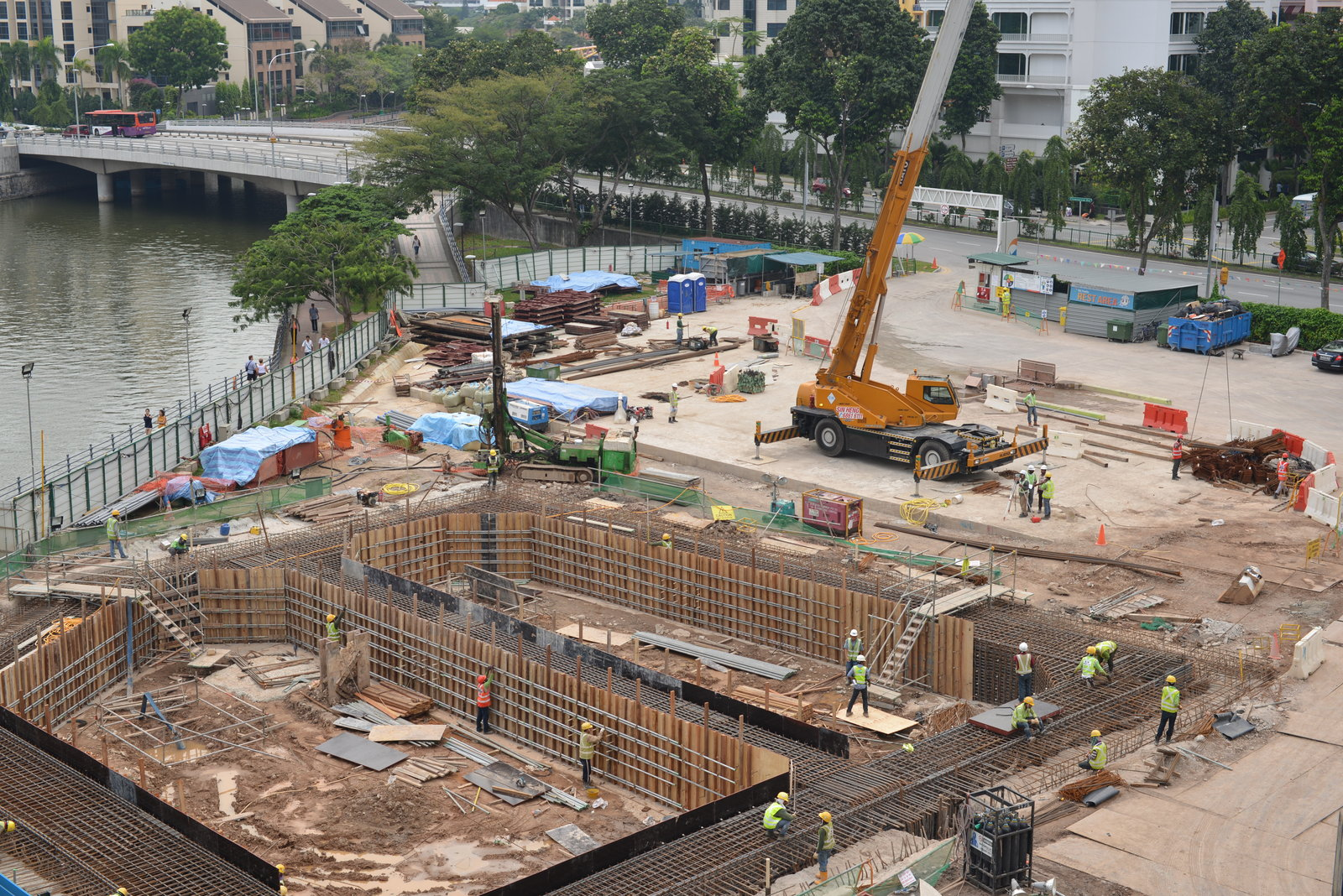
The construction of DTL tunnels between Chinatown and Fort Canning. The project was considered an engineering feat, as the construction of the tunnels involved the diversion of the Singapore River.

Downtown Line stations timeline
Date of opening	Project	Description
22 December 2013	Stage 1 (DTL1)	Bugis – Chinatown
27 December 2015	Stage 2 (DTL2)	Bukit Panjang – Rochor
21 October 2017	Stage 3 (DTL3)	Fort Canning – Expo
28 February 2025	Hume station	Opening of Hume infill station
26 December 2026	Stage 3 Extension (DTL3e)	Xilin – Sungei Bedok
2035	Stage 2 Extension (DTL2e)	DE1 – Sungei Kadut

Construction of the DTL began with a groundbreaking ceremony at Chinatown station on 12 February 2008. The 12 stations of DTL2 were announced in July that year. A two-storey building at Halifax Road and two strips of land at Upper Bukit Timah Road were gazetted for acquisition. In November 2008, the LTA awarded the contracts for the line's signalling, communications systems, and rolling stock. In June 2009, the LTA announced that the station names of DTL1 and DTL2 had been finalised through a public poll. Construction of DTL2 officially began with a groundbreaking ceremony at Beauty World station on 3 July 2009. DTL2 tunnelling works began in June 2011.

In August 2010, the LTA announced the 16 stations for DTL3, including an additional station in Jalan Besar. Due to the increased construction costs, the LTA announced that the project would exceed the S$12 billion budget. The properties acquired included 15 landed properties, two empty plots, a petrol station along Upper Changi Road East, and a food court. Following a public poll with 3000 respondents, the names of the DTL3 stations were finalised in August 2011. SBS Transit was appointed by the LTA in the same month to operate the line for 15 years. Construction of DTL3 officially began with a groundbreaking ceremony at Expo station on 28 November 2011. Tunnelling works for the DTL3 officially began at Mattar station on 11 July 2012.

Construction of DTL1 involved tunnelling under shophouses and high-rise buildings in Singapore's central business district. To construct Telok Ayer station, a temporary viaduct was built along Cross Street to bypass closed traffic lanes. DTL2 was mainly constructed in varying soil conditions of marine clay and shallow rock formation, at Woodlands Road and Upper Bukit Timah Road. At Rochor station, the Rochor Canal was temporarily diverted to a 150-metre (490 ft) canal box. The arterial roads of Sungei Road and Rochor Canal Road were rerouted several times. Steel decks for traffic were installed above the canal due to limited room to divert the roads sideways. Cement was pumped into the soft marine clay that extended 30 metres (98 ft) deep.

At Fort Canning station, the Central Expressway was closely monitored for any structural movement. The Singapore River was diverted to accommodate the construction of tunnels between Chinatown and Fort Canning, as direct tunnelling beneath the river would risk ground subsidence or tunnel flooding. Between Fort Canning and Bencoolen, the tunnels were built close to the operational tunnels of the North East (NEL), North–South (NSL), and Circle lines. Various instruments were used to monitor the live tunnels to ensure the construction of the DTL tunnels did not impact train operations. The construction of Expo DTL station involved underpinning two existing MRT viaduct pier foundations. A transfer beam, with hydraulic jacks installed, was constructed before the excavation to support the two pillars.

Alpine Bau, the main contractor for three DTL stations – King Albert Park, Sixth Avenue, and Tan Kah Kee – went bankrupt on 19 June 2013. While seeking a new contractor, the LTA appointed McConnell Dowell South East Asia, the contractor for Beauty World station, as the caretaker contractor to carry on tunnelling works. Through engagement with the Ministry of Manpower, the 400 workers affected were reassigned or repatriated. New contractors – McConnell Dowell South East Asia and SK E&C (Singapore) – were appointed in August 2013 to continue construction work on the three affected stations. Due to the bankruptcy, the DTL2's projected completion date was delayed to mid-2016.

=== Opening ===
An open house for the DTL1 stations was held on 7 December 2013, before DTL1 commenced operations on 22 December. An opening ceremony was held on the day before, presided over by Prime Minister Lee Hsien Loong. Businesses along the line interviewed by Today expressed hopes of increased footfall, but anticipated that the bulk of their patronage would continue to come from weekday office workers and regular weekend customers.

Transport Minister Lui Tuck Yew announced on 28 June 2015 that the DTL2 would be opened earlier, with works 95% complete. The DTL Operation Control Centre (OCC), which was operating at Kim Chuan, would be relocated to Gali Batu Depot. Tunnelling works for DTL3 were completed in June 2015. A public preview for DTL2 was held on 5 December. DTL2 began operations on 27 December 2015, and Prime Minister Lee officiated the DTL2 opening ceremony at Botanic Gardens. In July 2016, the LTA reported that daily weekday ridership on the DTL had tripled from 83,000 in October 2015 to 250,000. More passengers from the NSL and NEL began transferring to the DTL for their journeys into the city.

On 31 May 2017, the LTA announced that DTL3 would open on 21 October that year. The DTL3 open house was held on 15 October. The opening ceremony of DTL3 was held at Expo station and presided over by Transport Minister Khaw Boon Wan. On its opening day, DTL services were disrupted by a defective train and the activation of an emergency communication button by a passenger. Commuters interviewed by CNA praised the added convenience brought by DTL3. Daily weekday ridership on the DTL increased to 470,000 in February 2018. In August 2020, Transport Minister Ong Ye Kung disclosed that the DTL's construction costs had amounted to S$21 billion (US$15.2 billion).

=== Extensions and new stations ===
An extension of the DTL3 to connect with the ERL (Note: The 21 km (13 mi) Eastern Regional Line (ERL) was first announced by Transport Minister Raymond Lim in January 2008 and would serve Tanjong Rhu, Marine Parade, Siglap, Bedok South, and Upper East Coast.) was first announced by Transport Minister Lui in January 2013 as part of the 2013 Land Transport Master Plan. Details of the DTL3 extension (DTL3e) were finalised on 15 August 2014 alongside the merger of the ERL and the Thomson Line into the Thomson–East Coast Line (TEL). The 2.2 km (1.4 mi) extension would include Xilin and Sungei Bedok, the latter serving as an interchange station with the TEL. The contract for Xilin station was awarded in March 2016, and the contract for Sungei Bedok was awarded in June.

While initially planned to be completed by 2024, Transport Minister Chee Hong Tat announced on 6 December 2024 that DTL3e would commence operations in the second half of 2026. From July to September 2026, train service hours on the DTL were shortened to allow systems integration testing. On 4 November 2026, Transport Minister Jeffrey Siow announced the DTL3e will open on 26 December.

During the construction of the DTL, only the structural provisions for Hume station were built. These shell structural provisions were completed in 2014. Following published calls from nearby residents advocating for the station's opening, Senior Minister of State for Transport Janil Puthucheary announced in March 2019 that Hume station would be built in tandem with the redevelopment of the Rail Corridor. A groundbreaking ceremony for the station's construction was held on 28 February 2021. Hume station opened on 28 February 2025, ahead of the original prediction of the second quarter of 2025. It is the first underground infill station to open in Singapore.

In 2019, the LTA announced that the DTL would be extended from Bukit Panjang to interchange with the NSL at Sungei Kadut station, which would also be an infill station on the NSL. Details of the 4 km (2.5 mi) extension were finalised in January 2025. Slated to begin operations in 2035, the DTL2 extension (DTL2e) is to include an additional unnamed station along Sungei Kadut Avenue. The contracts for the stations' construction were awarded in February 2026.

== Network and operations ==
=== Service ===
The DTL is a medium-capacity rail line, and is the longest fully underground and automated MRT line in Singapore. In June 2025, the DTL recorded 463,000 daily passenger trips. The line operates between 5:30 am and 12:46 am. On weekdays and Saturdays, the first train leaves Bukit Panjang at 5:30 am; the last train leaves Expo at 11:40 pm. (Note: On Sundays and public holidays, the first train leaves Bukit Panjang at 5:50 am; the last train leaves Expo at 11:40 pm.) Trains run every 2.5 to 5 minutes, and the line's total travel time from Bukit Panjang to Expo is 69 minutes. The DTL initially shared the same fare structure with the NEL and the CCL, charging higher fares than the North–South and East–West lines due to greater operating costs. On 30 December 2016, the Public Transport Council (PTC) lowered the DTL fares to match the other lines, which use distance-based fares. The PTC said it was intended to minimise commuter confusion.

The DTL is operated by SBS Transit, and it is the first MRT line to be operated under the New Rail Financing Framework (NRFF). Under the NRFF, the LTA and SBS Transit share the profits and financial risks in operating the DTL, while SBS Transit pays a licence charge to the government. In 2022, the DTL was brought under a revised version of the NRFF, which enhanced the profit- and risk-sharing mechanisms for the operator and the government. The new NRFF is intended to mitigate commercial volatility for the operator while adjusting the level of revenue risk assumed by the government. As such, SBS Transit operates the DTL, alongside the NEL and the Sengkang and Punggol LRT lines, (Note: LRT stands for Light Rail Transit.) under a consolidated rail licence until 31 December 2032.

From 2021 to 2024, the DTL was the most reliable MRT line by mean kilometres between failures (MKBF). Based on the 12-month moving average by LTA, its MKBF reached 8.15 million train-km in the first quarter of 2024. However, this fell to 4.12 million train-km in June 2025. The DTL recorded 2.787 million train-km by the end of 2025. Nevertheless, the DTL remained the most reliable in the network in January 2026.

=== Route ===
Geographic route map of the DTL

The fully underground 42-kilometre (26-mile) (Note: More precisely, the total length is 41.9 km (26.0 mi). DTL1: 4.3 km (2.7 mi), DTL2: 16.6 km (10.3 mi), DTL3: 21 km (13 mi).) DTL runs from Bukit Panjang in northwestern Singapore to Singapore Expo in the east via the Central Area. Beginning at Bukit Panjang station, the line runs south along Upper Bukit Timah Road, then parallels Dunearn Road and Bukit Timah Road between King Albert Park and Newton. It continues along Bukit Timah Road, Sungei Road, Rochor Canal Road and Rochor Road between Newton and Bugis station. Turning south to Promenade, the DTL runs parallel with the CCL and crosses Marina Bay to Bayfront before turning west to Downtown station. The line parallels Cross Street between Telok Ayer and Chinatown.

Turning north-east, the DTL crosses the Singapore River to Fort Canning station and passes underneath Fort Canning Hill. The line crosses itself between Bencoolen and Jalan Besar. There is no physical interchange between the two portions of the line at that point. After Geylang Bahru, the DTL continues in an eastwards direction, briefly paralleling Ubi Avenue 2 and Kaki Bukit Avenue 1. Reception tracks from Ubi and Bedok North connect the DTL to the Tai Seng Facility Building. After Bedok Reservoir station, the line briefly turns northwards to Tampines West, then eastwards to Tampines, and southwards to Upper Changi station before terminating at Expo station.

The DTL will be extended to connect with the Thomson–East Coast Line at Sungei Bedok station in the second half of 2026. The line is coloured blue on official maps.

=== Stations ===
The line has 35 operational stations from Bukit Panjang to Expo. Twelve stations (eventually thirteen upon completion of the Cross Island Line) connect to other MRT/LRT lines. Three of the interchange stations – Bukit Panjang, Newton, and Tampines – operate as out-of-station interchanges, requiring passengers to tap out and re-enter the system to transfer between the lines.

Station code	Station name	Images	Interchange; Adjacent transportation	Opening
DTL2e (under construction, to be ready by 2035)
DE2 NS6	Sungei Kadut		North–South Line	2035; 9 years' time
DE1	DE1		—	2035; 9 years' time
In operation
DT1 – BP6	Bukit Panjang	A wide, brightly lit underground station platform with commuters walking across the polished stone floor and riding long escalators. One side of the station features a striking blue-tiled wall with vertical slats.	Bukit Panjang LRT ― Bukit Panjang	27 December 2015; 10 years ago
DT2	Cashew	A modern underground train platform at Cashew featuring glass safety doors and a departing train.	—	27 December 2015; 10 years ago
DT3	Hillview	Underground platform at Hillview station with glass screen doors and an escalator. There is a curved platform on the brown wall above.	—	27 December 2015; 10 years ago
DT4	Hume	Commuters navigate Hume station island platforms.	—	28 February 2025; 1 year ago
DT5	Beauty World	Commuters departing Beauty World station on escalators. The platform floor characterized by a unique, flowing black-and-white wave pattern.	Beauty World (2028)	27 December 2015; 10 years ago
DT6 CR15	King Albert Park	Commuters wait on a spacious underground platform featuring metal benches and glass screen doors. The station is illuminated by bright overhead lights and features a teal-colored slatted wall design	Cross Island Line (2032)	27 December 2015; 10 years ago
DT7	Sixth Avenue	A commuter stands on the modern platform of Sixth Avenue station next to glass screen doors. The station features a dark blue and white tiled upper wall and an escalator leading to the concourse.	—	27 December 2015; 10 years ago
DT8	Tan Kah Kee	A passenger stands on an underground platform at Tan Kah Kee station near glass screen doors adorned with colorful advertisements. The station features polished floors and an escalator leading to the upper levels.	—	27 December 2015; 10 years ago
DT9 CC19	Botanic Gardens	Commuters wait for the incoming train on a brightly lit platform at Botanic Gardens featuring glass screen doors and visible escalator access.	Circle Line	27 December 2015; 10 years ago
DT10 TE11	Stevens	Passengers walk across a spacious, polished platform floor next to a departing train at Stevens.	Thomson–East Coast Line	27 December 2015; 10 years ago
DT11 – NS21	Newton	A wide-angle view of the island platform at Newton with commuters seated on benches near the tracks.	North–South Line	27 December 2015; 10 years ago
DT12 NE7	Little India	Commuters navigate the brightly lit, modern underground platform of Little India MRT station. The station features polished grey and reddish-brown stone flooring, with long escalators leading to an upper level.	North East Line	27 December 2015; 10 years ago
DT13	Rochor	A largely empty platform at Rochor, which features light grey flooring and sleek, angular white and black wall panels. The center of the station is dominated by a large, bright green lift shaft that serves as a canvas for the station artwork.	—	27 December 2015; 10 years ago
DT14 EW12	Bugis	A perspective shot of a train stopped at Bugis station with commuters departing or boarding through open screen doors.	East–West Line	22 December 2013; 12 years ago
DT15 CC4	Promenade	Passengers walk along a narrow side platform area equipped with digital information displays and safety doors at Promenade.	Circle Line ― Marina Centre	22 December 2013; 12 years ago
DT16 CC34	Bayfront	Commuters walk along the brightly lit underground platform of Bayfront station, with some boarding a train while others pull luggage out of the train. The station features polished granite-style flooring and full-height glass platform screen doors.	Circle Line	22 December 2013; 12 years ago
DT17	Downtown	Passengers wait on the side platform of Downtown station. A staircase and escalator leading to the concourse level.	—	22 December 2013; 12 years ago
DT18	Telok Ayer	Telok Ayer station side platform which features polished flooring and full-height glass platform screen doors lined with colorful large-scale advertisements.To the right is a cylindrical glass elevator shaft.	—	22 December 2013; 12 years ago
DT19 NE4	Chinatown	Commuters walk along the underground platform at Chinatown MRT station. The station includes a red accent wall and stairs leading to the North East Line.	North East Line	22 December 2013; 12 years ago
DT20	Fort Canning	A bright, modern platform at Fort Canning with green accent walls. Commuters are walking near the screen doors, and an escalator leads upward to the right.	—	21 October 2017; 9 years ago
DT21	Bencoolen	A clean, well-lit underground platform at Bencoolen featuring warm ceiling lights and platform screen doors. A set of escalators connect the platforms to the concourse in the upper levels.	—	21 October 2017; 9 years ago
DT22	Jalan Besar	A symmetrical view of the MRT platform at Jalan Besar featuring dark, metallic grey ceiling panels and bright white floor tiles. The platform is relatively quiet with a few distant figures.	—	21 October 2017; 9 years ago
DT23	Bendemeer	A high-ceilinged station platform of Bendeemer. Escalators and stairs rise into a dimly lit upper concourse, with purple-tinted wall panels.	—	21 October 2017; 9 years ago
DT24	Geylang Bahru	Geylang Bahru platform with curved patterns on the beige floor. A lift brings people from the platform to the concourse	—	21 October 2017; 9 years ago
DT25	Mattar	A vibrant station platform featuring a large, textured rock-like art installation on the right wall above the train doors (bound for Bukit Panjang).	—	21 October 2017; 9 years ago
DT26 CC10	MacPherson	A view along a side platform of MacPherson. A few commuters were walking along the polished floor as a train departs.	Circle Line	21 October 2017; 9 years ago
DT27	Ubi	Ubi underground platform featuring blue and green vertical accent panels on the far wall. The station has a spacious feel with recessed circular ceiling lights.	—	21 October 2017; 9 years ago
DT28	Kaki Bukit	A busy station platform with commuters waiting behind glass screen doors at Kaki Bukit. The ceiling features long, linear lighting strips that extends along the length of the station.	—	21 October 2017; 9 years ago
DT29	Bedok North	A high-ceilinged platform featuring large decorative motifs on the upper walls. A tall glass elevator shaft stands prominently in the platform area of Bedok North.	—	21 October 2017; 9 years ago
DT30	Bedok Reservoir	A wide, symmetrical shot of the platform with high, dark grey textured walls. A blue decorative art piece is displayed along the grey lift shaft in the center of Bedok Reservoir station.	—	21 October 2017; 9 years ago
DT31	Tampines West	A modern station interior with warm orange wall panels and large-scale mural art. Escalators are packed with commuters moving between the platform and concourse.	—	21 October 2017; 9 years ago
DT32 – EW2	Tampines	A view of Tampines station platform featuring high orange ceiling panels and a large glass-walled escalator bank on the left side.	East–West Line ― Tampines; Tampines Concourse	21 October 2017; 9 years ago
DT33	Tampines East	A high-angle view of Tampines North MRT platform with purple-toned wall panels. Escalators are packed with commuters moving between the platform and concourse. Another crowd of commuters is visible near the platform screen doors, and a long escalator bank descends from the upper level.	—	21 October 2017; 9 years ago
DT34	Upper Changi	A clean, brightly lit platform of Upper Changi featuring signage of the station name and destination above the glass screen doors. The station has a dim white ceiling and a polished grey floor.	—	21 October 2017; 9 years ago
DT35 CG1	Expo	Expo station platform with blue accents and glass railings. Commuters are seen boarding a train through the screen doors, with an escalator and high industrial-style ceiling in the background.	East–West Line (Changi Airport Branch Line) (until mid-2030s); Thomson–East Coast Line (after mid-2030s)	21 October 2017; 9 years ago
DTL3e (under testing, to be ready by 26 December 2026)
DT36	Xilin	An outdoor shot of a construction site for the future Xilin station. Heavy machinery, including a large crane, is visible alongside building materials like rebar and concrete slabs.	—	26 December 2026; 0 years ago
DT37 TE31	Sungei Bedok	An outdoor view of Sungei Bedok station entrance under construction. The structure features a white steel frame and a flat roof, surrounded by orange and white safety barriers and road construction.	Thomson–East Coast Line	26 December 2026; 0 years ago

== Infrastructure ==
=== Rolling stock ===
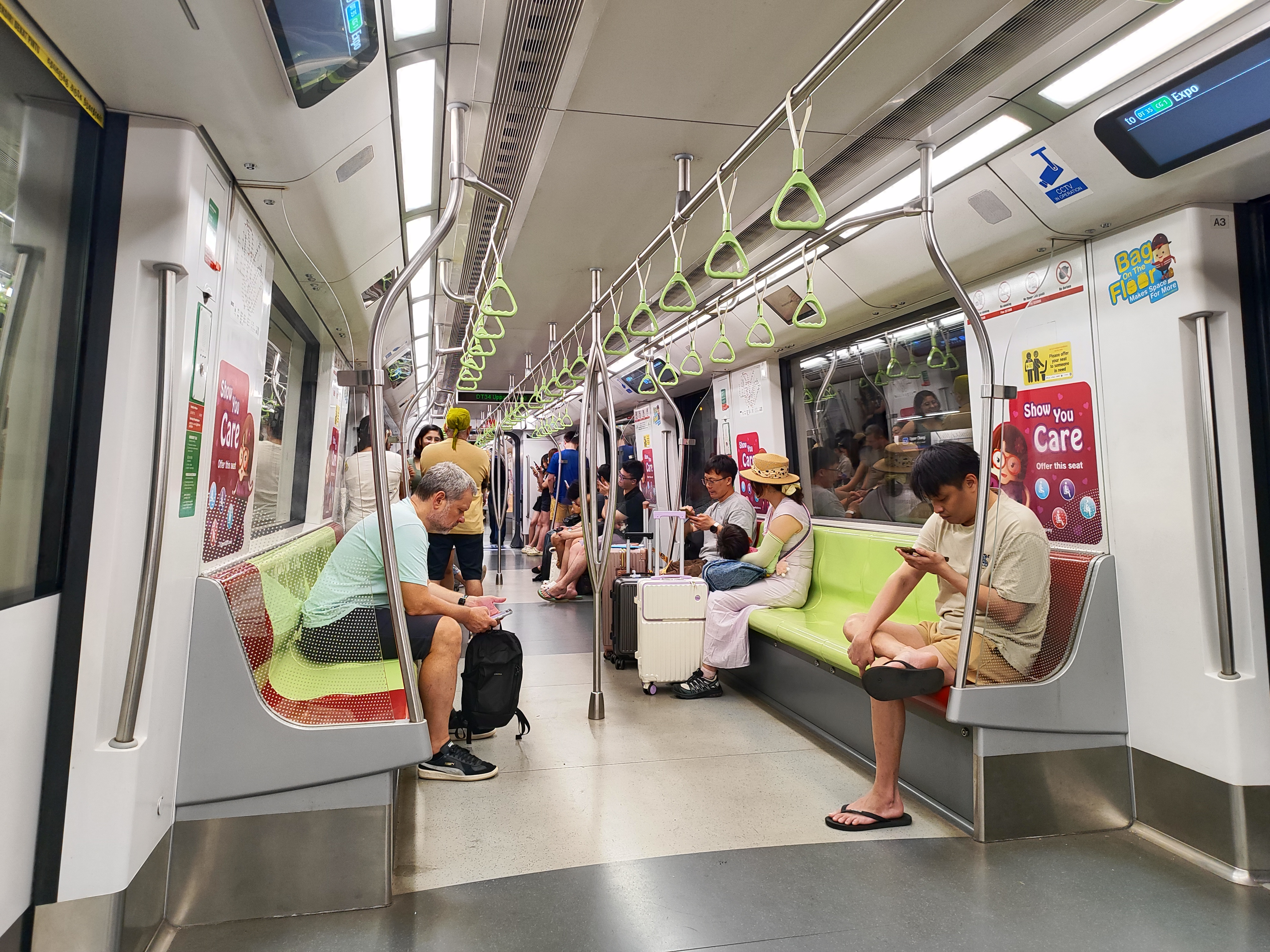
Interior of a Bombardier Movia C951

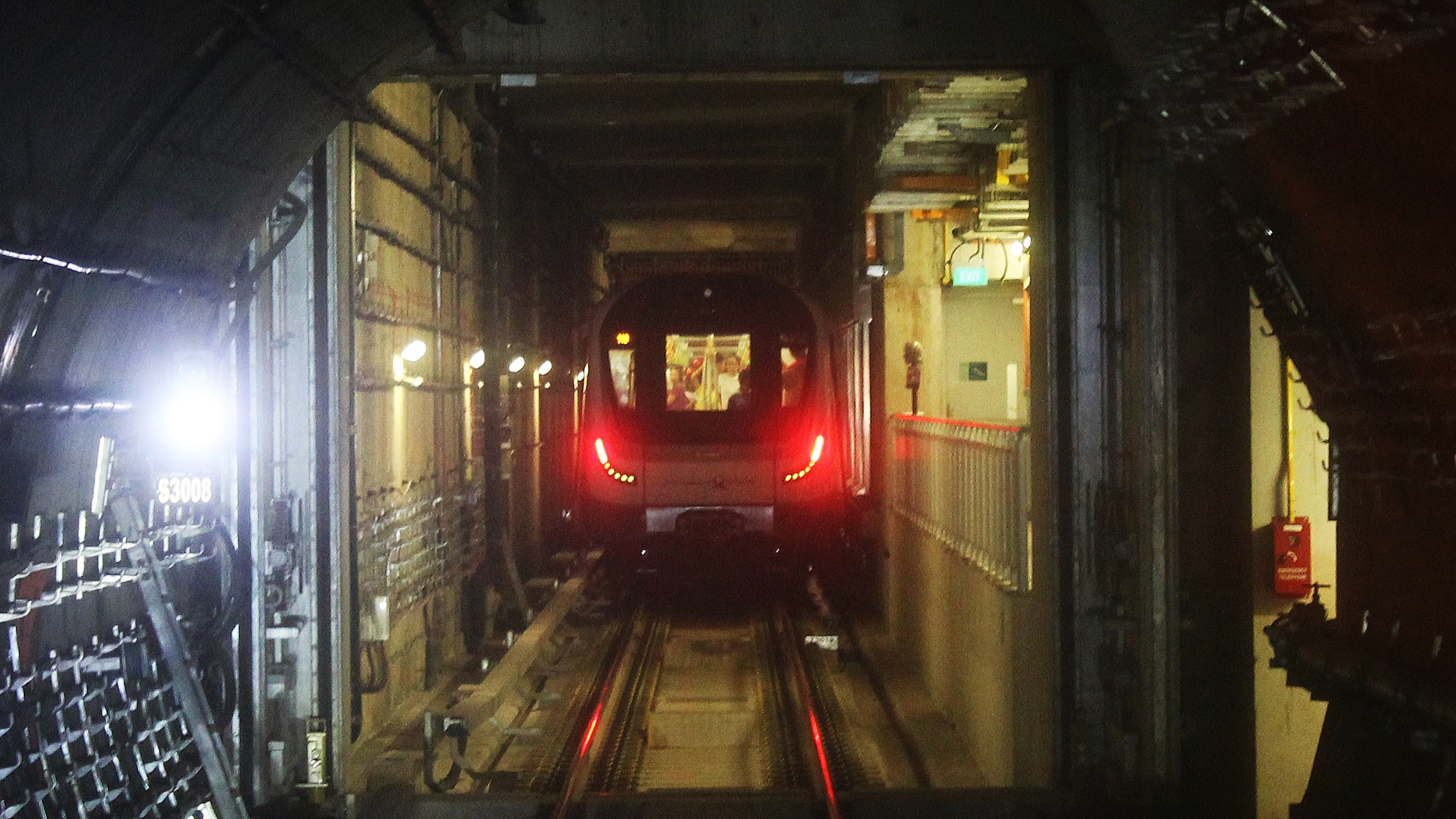
A Bombardier Movia C951 viewed in a tunnel

The DTL's rolling stock consists of 92 three-car trains with four doors on each side of the carriage. An initial order for 73 Bombardier Movia C951 trains was placed for S$570.7 million (US$392.4 million). In March 2013, the LTA ordered an additional 15 trainsets from Bombardier for S$119.2 million (US$95.3 million). Additional contract options brought the overall order to 92. During the morning peak, 58 trains run on the DTL, and 56 are deployed during the evening peak. The trains were assembled in a Changchun Bombardier Railway Vehicles Company facility (Note: A joint venture between Bombardier and CNR Changchun Railway Vehicle Company.) in Changchun, China, with design work done in a Bombardier engineering centre in Hennigsdorf, Germany. The first trains arrived in Singapore on 12 October 2012. As the DTL is operated under the NRFF, the trains feature the LTA's logo and blue branding.

The trains are fully automatic and powered by a 750V DC third-rail power system. Each trainset has a length of 70.1 m (230 ft) and a width of 3.2 m (10 ft), with a maximum operational speed of 80 km/h (50 mph). (Note: The trains have a maximum design speed of 90 km/h (56 mph).) The trains have a service life of 30 years with a design travel distance of 130,000 km (81,000 mi) per year. The train design is intended to improve commuters' comfort and convenience, with features such as an ergonomic curved seat design and perch seats in the gangway for wider standing space. The trains can accommodate up to 1,050 passengers. The train car bodies are constructed from high-capacity aluminium, allowing 90% of the material to be recycled at the end of their service life. The trains are also equipped with regenerative braking and lightweight converters, reducing overall weight and electricity consumption by about 2,000 MWh per year.

The trains are fitted with load sensors that detect passenger weight. This data is used for the Passenger Load Information System, which displays crowding levels in each car on LCD screens at station platforms. Dynamic Route Map Displays (DRMDs) were initially installed in the trains but were later replaced with LCD screens displaying station arrival information, the route map, and the side on which the train doors will open. Four trains of the fleet are equipped with Automatic Track Inspection (ATI) – a system of cameras, lasers, and sensors that can detect defects such as rail cracks or missing fasteners.

The DTL also has a fleet of maintenance vehicles, including battery-electric locomotives from CSR Zhuzhou Electric Locomotive Co. Ltd, general maintenance vehicles from Gemac Engineering Machinery, rail grinding vehicles from Harsco Rail, and multifunction vehicles from MERMEC. SBS Transit also deploys a rail rover that not only checks for internal cracks or other track flaws, but also tunnel cracks, water leaks, or other structural anomalies. The rover is equipped with 3D cameras and laser sensors.

=== Depot ===
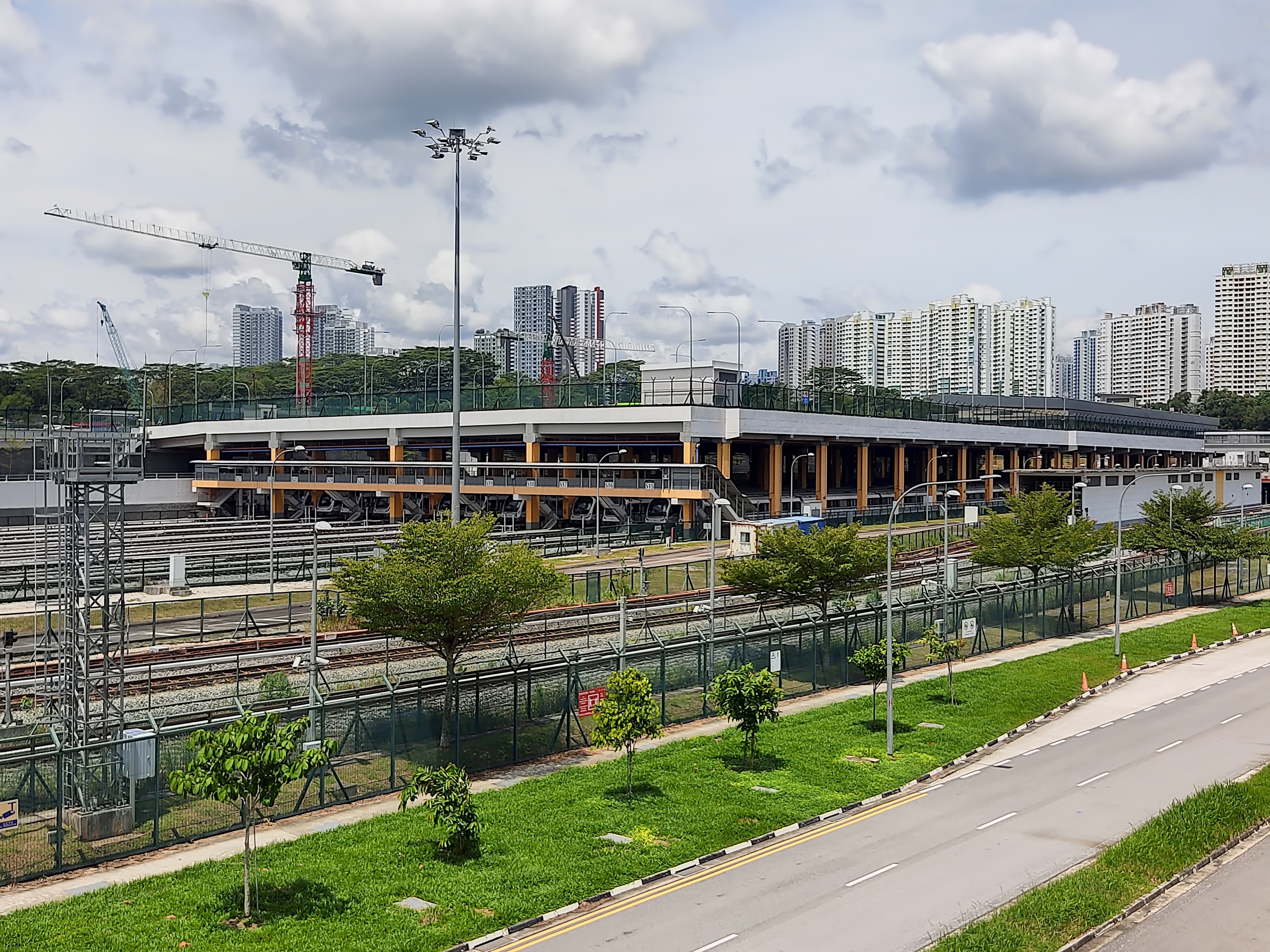
Gali Batu Depot in 2022

Gali Batu Depot, located at the northwestern end of the DTL beyond Bukit Panjang station, houses the line's fleet. Built by a joint venture between GS Engineering and Construction and Hock Lian Seng Infrastructure for S$410 million (US$281.9 million), the 27 ha (67-acre) depot includes the line's Operation Control Centre (OCC), which oversees and controls the line's operations. Before the completion of Gali Batu Depot, a temporary OCC was established at the CCL Kim Chuan Depot. The DTL trains were also temporarily stabled at Kim Chuan.

The at-grade depot was initially built for 42 three-car trains before being expanded to accommodate 81 trains. It comprises 18 ancillary buildings and a seven-storey administrative and workshop block, providing stabling, maintenance, operational, and support facilities for DTL operations. Other facilities include an automated storage and retrieval system for maintenance materials, equipment, and spare parts, as well as an automated train wash plant. A Siemens signalling simulation centre has been established at the depot, enabling software patch testing by LTA and the rail operator prior to deployment on the main line.

The Tai Seng Facility Building is a two-level underground structure measuring 52 metres (171 ft) wide and 295 metres (968 ft) long. It houses maintenance, operations, and staff facilities for DTL3. The East Coast Integrated Depot (ECID), which was completed in 2026, includes an underground section that can house 75 DTL trains.

=== Signalling ===
The DTL uses GoA4 automation and is therefore fully driverless. It is run by Siemens's Trainguard Sirius communications-based train control (CBTC) moving block system, which includes a fallback signalling system. Operating on a 2.4 GHz radio frequency, the CBTC system is configured for driverless unattended train operation (UTO). The CBTC system's subsystems consist of automatic train protection (ATP), Controlguide Rail 9000 automatic train supervision (ATS), and a Westrace computer-based interlocking (CBI) system. The signalling contract was originally awarded to Westinghouse Brake and Signal Holdings for S$287.5 million (US$197.7 million) in November 2008. (Note: Westinghouse Brake and Signal Holdings was succeeded by Invensys Rail, which was acquired by Siemens in 2013.)

Each train is equipped with a fully redundant speed and location system incorporating Doppler radars, axle-mounted tachogenerators and absolute position reference beacon readers. The Sirius hardware platform can be configured for manual operation, driverless attended operation (DTO) or UTO. The UTO builds upon the manual system but imposes significantly more stringent requirements. Any failure of the automatic functions in a manual system can be mitigated by the train operator taking control. The UTO system incorporates redundancy to ensure that trains can continue operating automatically without onboard intervention. In the event of total failure of automatic train operation, the control centre operator is able to move the train to the next station under CBTC protection.

The Westrace CBI is custom-configured to meet LTA's signalling principles. It is designed to function with primary train detection via track circuits, which also provide speed codes to allow trains to revert to conventional operation if the CBTC system fails. The SystematICS platform hosts the ATS functions, which comprise a suite of software modules selected to meet LTA's requirements. For the DTL, additional modules were developed to support UTO. The Integrated Supervisory Control System (ISCS) provides the ATS displays at the operations control centre and passenger service centre multifunctional terminals.

=== Station facilities ===
All DTL stations are wheelchair-accessible. A tactile system, consisting of tiles with rounded or elongated raised studs, guides visually impaired commuters through the station, with dedicated routes that connect the station entrances to the platforms or between the lines. Wide fare gates allow easier access for wheelchair users into the station. Platform screen doors (PSDs) along the line were installed by Westinghouse Signal (Invensys Rail Group), supplied by Faiveley. The PSDs provide safety for passengers, offering protection from arriving and departing trains.

Fifteen DTL stations are designated Civil Defence (CD) shelters. (Note: The CD stations are Bukit Panjang, Cashew, Hillview, Beauty World, King Albert Park, Sixth Avenue, Tan Kah Kee, Geylang Bahru, Bedok North, Bedok Reservoir, Tampines West, Tampines, Tampines East, Upper Changi, and Expo.) These stations, which are to be activated in times of national emergency, feature reinforced steel blast doors and decontamination chambers to protect against chemical attacks.

== Culture ==
=== Architecture ===
DTL station architecture

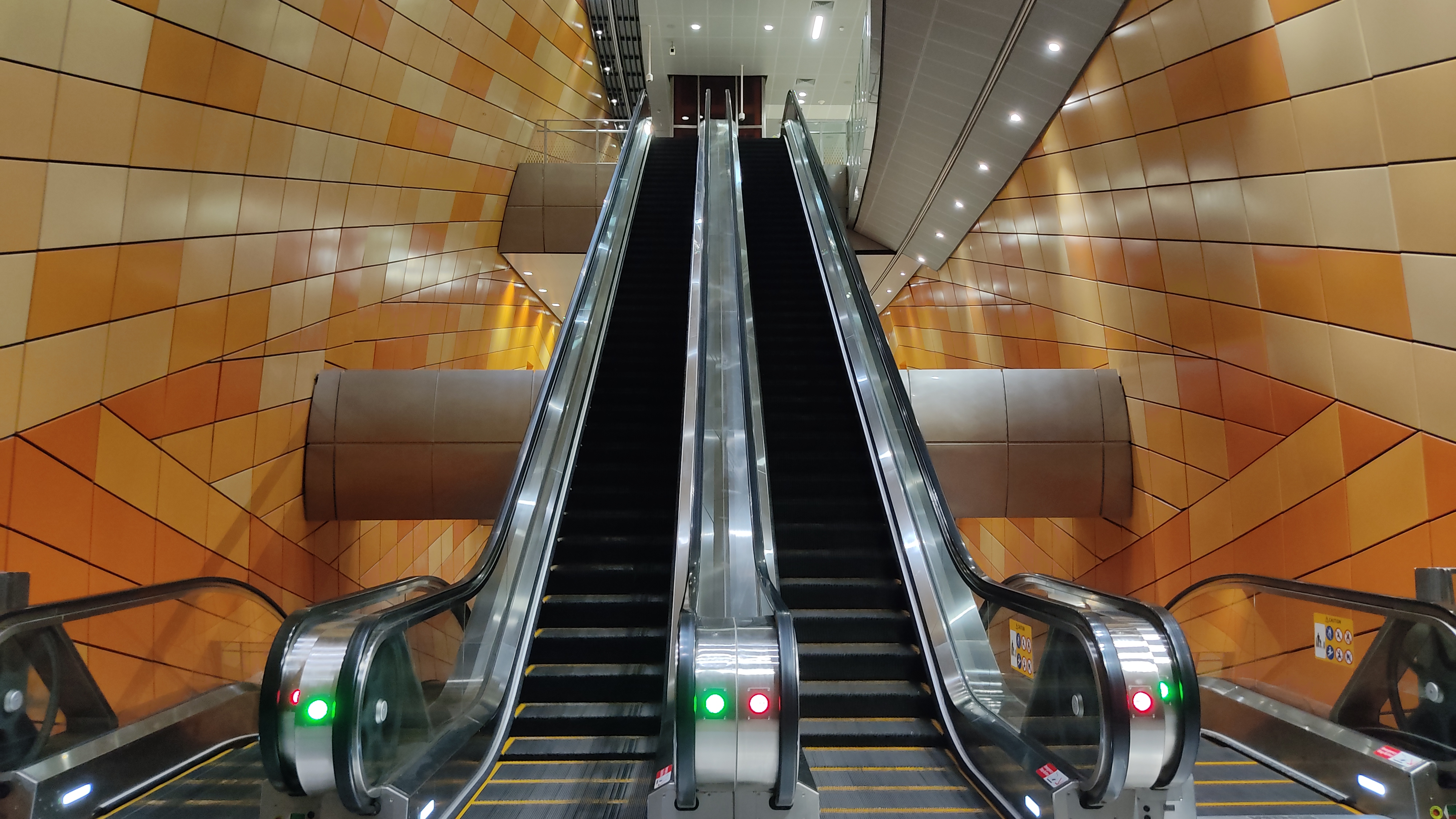
Bencoolen station with curved walls in earth-tone colours. It is the deepest station at 43 m (141 ft) deep.

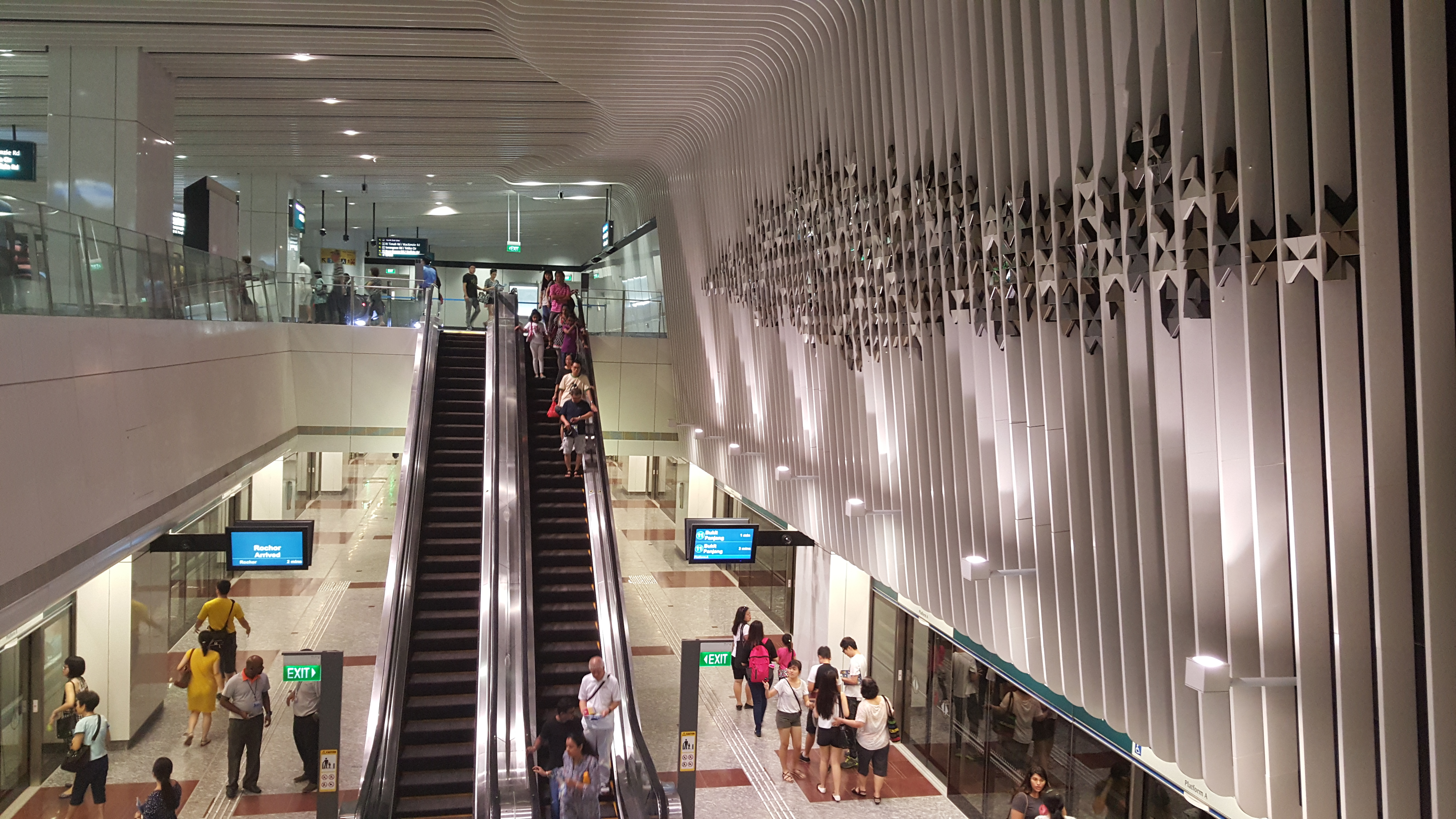
Little India station adopted a flowing fabric theme reminiscent of the Indian sari to reflect the vicinity's heritage.

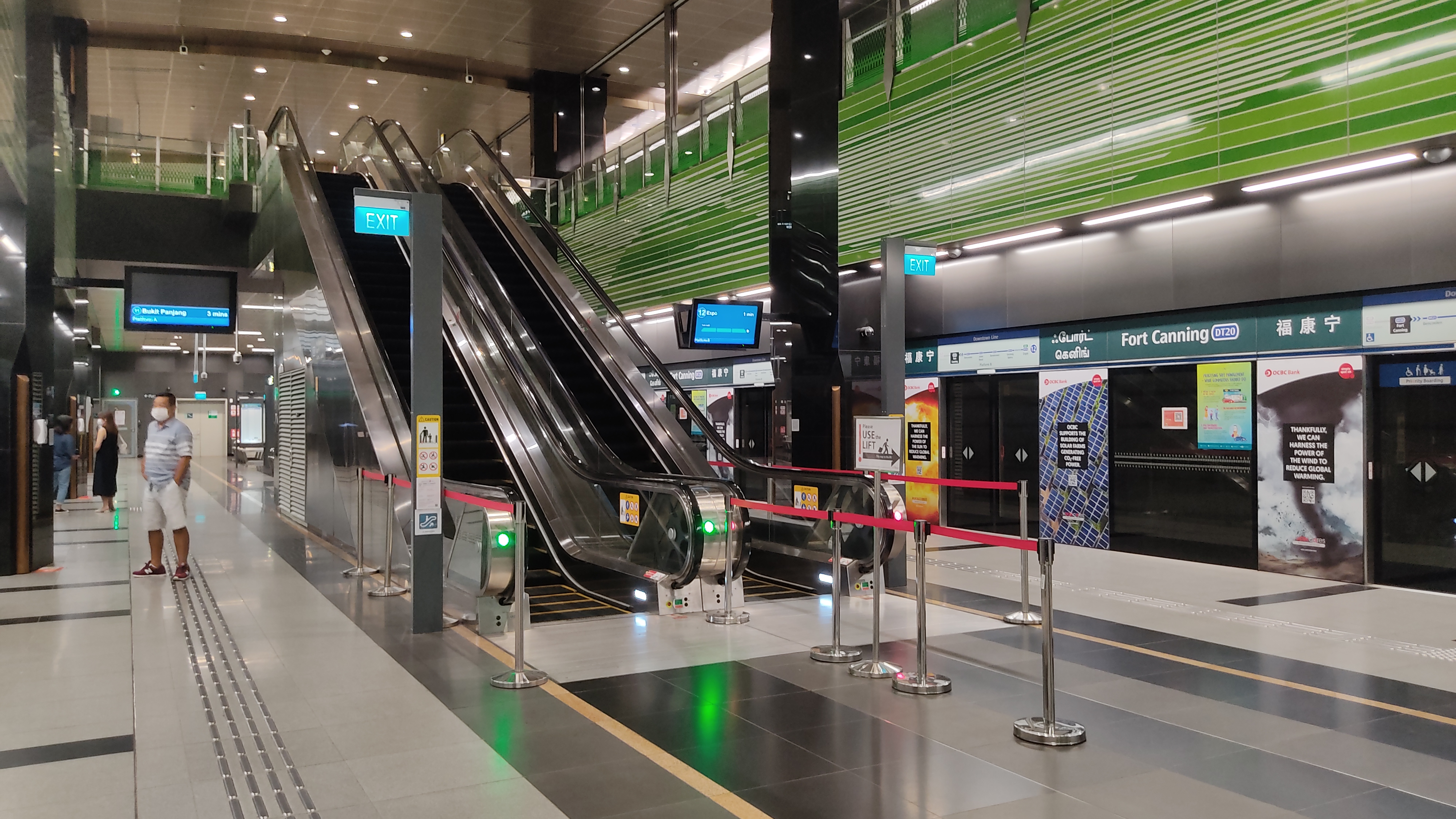
Fort Canning station has a natural green theme. Abstract patterns of the former National Theatre are featured on the concourse stone walls and railings.

The DTL features two of the deepest stations on the MRT network – Promenade and Bencoolen – at 43 m (141 ft) deep. (Note: LTA initially listed Promenade station's depth at 42 m (138 ft).) Stevens station, which has a depth of 34.22 metres (112.3 ft), has a stacked platform arrangement due to limited space constraints by the nearby flyover and canal. Bencoolen station has six underground levels and was designed by Aedas. The deep depth was to avoid the existing surface infrastructure and the other rail tunnels that intersect the alignment. The curving interior walls of Bencoolen station are meant to resemble canyon walls, while earth-tone colours were used to represent the many layers of the soil.

According to Paul Fok, the LTA's Group Director of Infrastructure and Design Engineering, the station designs reflect the heritage and culture of their surrounding areas where possible. The interior of Botanic Gardens station incorporates touches of nature with green palettes that reflect the design concept of flora and fauna. Little India station was designed by architects61, which adopted a theme of flowing fabric, based on the Indian sari, to reflect the vicinity's heritage. Due to its location near Fort Canning Park, Fort Canning station has a natural green theme with an arched ceiling in its interior. As a tribute to the former National Theatre that once stood near the station site, abstract patterns of the theatre are featured on the concourse stone walls and railings.

=== Artworks ===
Thirty-three artworks are installed along the DTL as part of the Art-in-Transit programme. Each artwork is integrated into the station's architecture and intended to capture commuters' attention and sustain the engagement of regular passengers as they pass through the station. For this collection, the LTA appointed four curators – Bridget Tracy Tan, June Yap, Patrick Chia, and Hanson Ho. Each artist worked with a curator during the commissioning of the artwork. A panel, chaired by Singaporean artist and educator Milenko Prvački, oversaw each artist's proposal and also ensured the final work met the programme's objective.

Artwork list
Station code	Station name	Artwork name	Artist(s)
DT1	Bukit Panjang	Punctum of the Long Hills	John Clang
DT2	Cashew	Project Eden	Donna Ong
DT3	Hillview	What Remains	Darren Soh
DT4	Hume	Continuity	André Wee
DT5	Beauty World	Asemic Lines	Boedi Widjaja
DT6	King Albert Park	The Natural History of Singapore's Mythical Botanic Creatures	Soh Pei Ling, Chan Mei Hsien and Long Yinghan (Artists Caravan)
DT8	Tan Kah Kee	Gratitude (饮水思源) and Resilience (自强不息)	Hwa Chong Institution
DT9	Botanic Gardens	What is a tree?	Shirley Soh
DT10	Stevens	PIN – 23040	Om Mee Ai
DT11	Newton	Newton	Tan Zi Xi
DT12	Little India	Woven Field	Grace Tan
DT13	Rochor	Tracing Memories	LASALLE College of the Arts
DT14	Bugis	Ephemeral	Patrick Chia
DT15	Promenade	Earthcake	Ana Prvacki
DT17	Downtown	Leaves	Jason Lim
DT18	Telok Ayer	Charm of Bay	Lim Shing Ee
DT19	Chinatown	Flying Colours	Cheo Chai-Hiang
DT20	Fort Canning	Through His Eyes	Lim Tze Peng
DT21	Bencoolen	Tracing Memories	Nanyang Academy of Fine Arts
DT22	Jalan Besar	A Kaleidoscopic World	Lydia Wong
DT23	Bendemeer	And A New World	Cristene Chang
DT24	Geylang Bahru	Constructed Memories	Marienne Yang
DT25	Mattar	Agar Panel	Genevieve Chua
DT26	MacPherson	Trails of Thoughts	Aminah Mohd Sa'at (Neng)
DT27	Ubi	Staple	Zainudin Samsuri
DT28	Kaki Bukit	Welcome to Kaki Bukit	Hans Tan
DT29	Bedok North	Dedaun Masa (Leaves of Time)	Ahmad Abu Bakar
DT30	Bedok Reservoir	Somewhere Else	Ng Chee Yong
DT31; DT33	Tampines West; Tampines East	Welcome to Jingapore!	Jing Quek
DT32	Tampines	The Big Round & The Tall Long	Studio Juju
DT34	Upper Changi	I Am Anonymous	Boo Junfeng
DT35	Expo	A Banquet	Yeo Chee Kiong

== Sources ==
=== Other sources ===
- Feng, Zengkun (2017). Downtown Line: Soaring to New Heights (PDF). Singapore: Straits Times Press. ISBN 978-981-4747-66-0. OCLC 1003852882.
- Cooke, Robert; Han, Allan (2010). The Challenges of Delivering the Downtown Line Signalling System. Research Publishing Services. doi:10.3850/978-981-08-6396-8_P240. ISBN 978-981-08-6396-8.
- Zhuang, Justin; Soh, Darren (2022). Art in Transit: Downtown Line Singapore. Singapore: Land Transport Authority. ISBN 978-981-18-3967-2. OCLC 1342054525.
