= Sungei Kadut MRT station =

Future Mass Rapid Transit station in Singapore

Sungei Kadut NS6 DE2 双溪加株 சுங்கை காடூட்
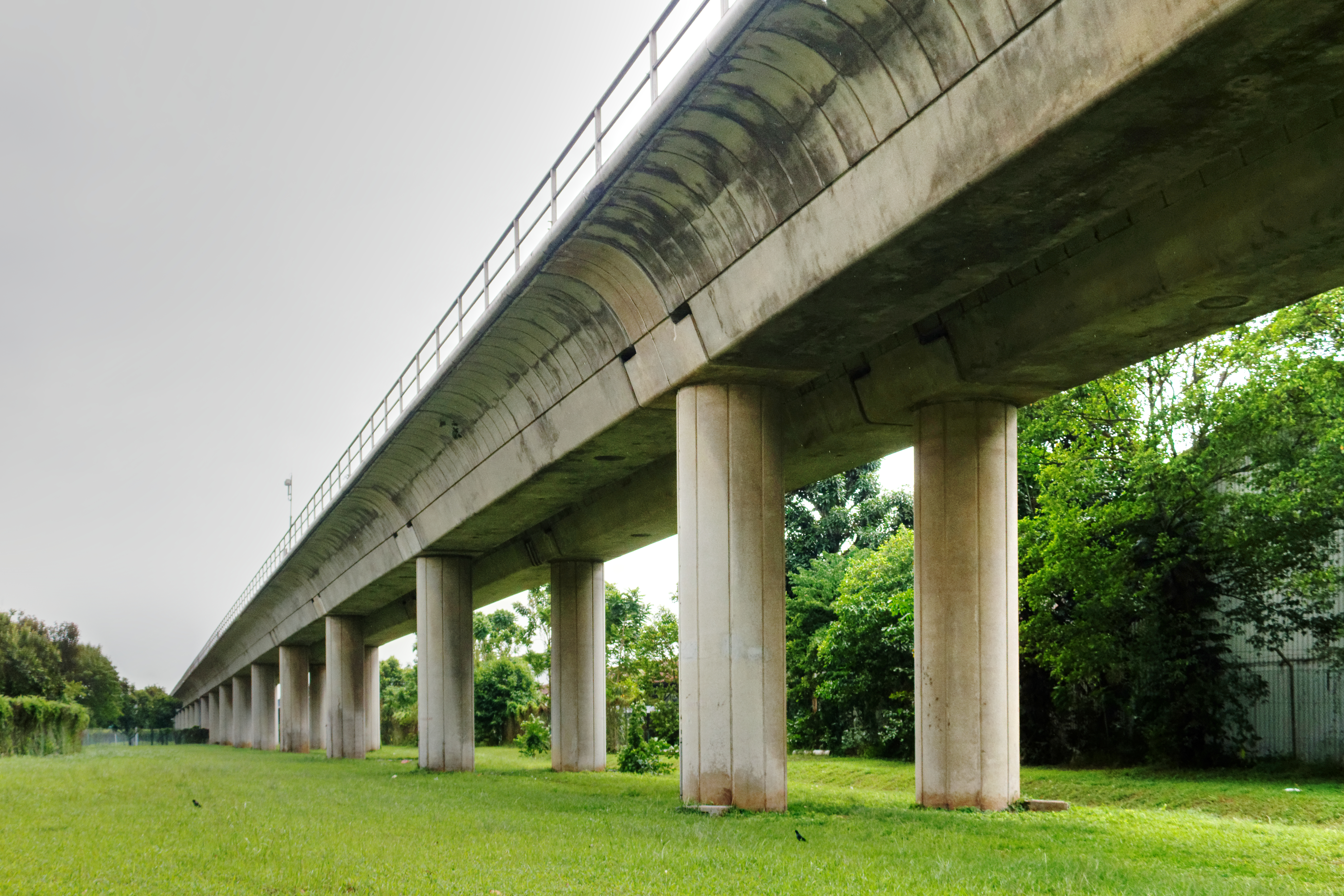
- Sungei Kadut MRT station site

General information
- Coordinates: 1°24′48″N 103°44′56″E
- System: Future Mass Rapid Transit (MRT) interchange and terminus
- Owner: Land Transport Authority
- Operator: SBS Transit (Downtown Line); SMRT Trains (North–South Line)
- Line: North–South Line Downtown Line
- Platforms: Side (North–South Line)

Construction
- Structure type: Underground (Downtown Line); Elevated (North–South Line)
- Platform levels: 2
- Accessible: Yes

History
- Opening: 2035; 9 years' time
- Former names: Kadut

Services
Preceding station	Mass Rapid Transit	Following station
Yew Tee towards Jurong East	North–South Line Future service	Kranji towards Marina South Pier
Terminus	Downtown Line Future service	DE1 towards Sungei Bedok
Location
- Location within Singapore Rail

Sungei Kadut MRT station is a future Mass Rapid Transit interchange station on the North–South (NSL) and Downtown (DTL) lines, located in Sungei Kadut, Singapore. The station was first announced as a provisional station on the NSL Woodlands Extension in the 1990s. In 2019, the Land Transport Authority (LTA) confirmed plans for its construction as part of the Land Transport Master Plan (LTMP) 2040. The station is expected to be completed in 2035.

== History ==
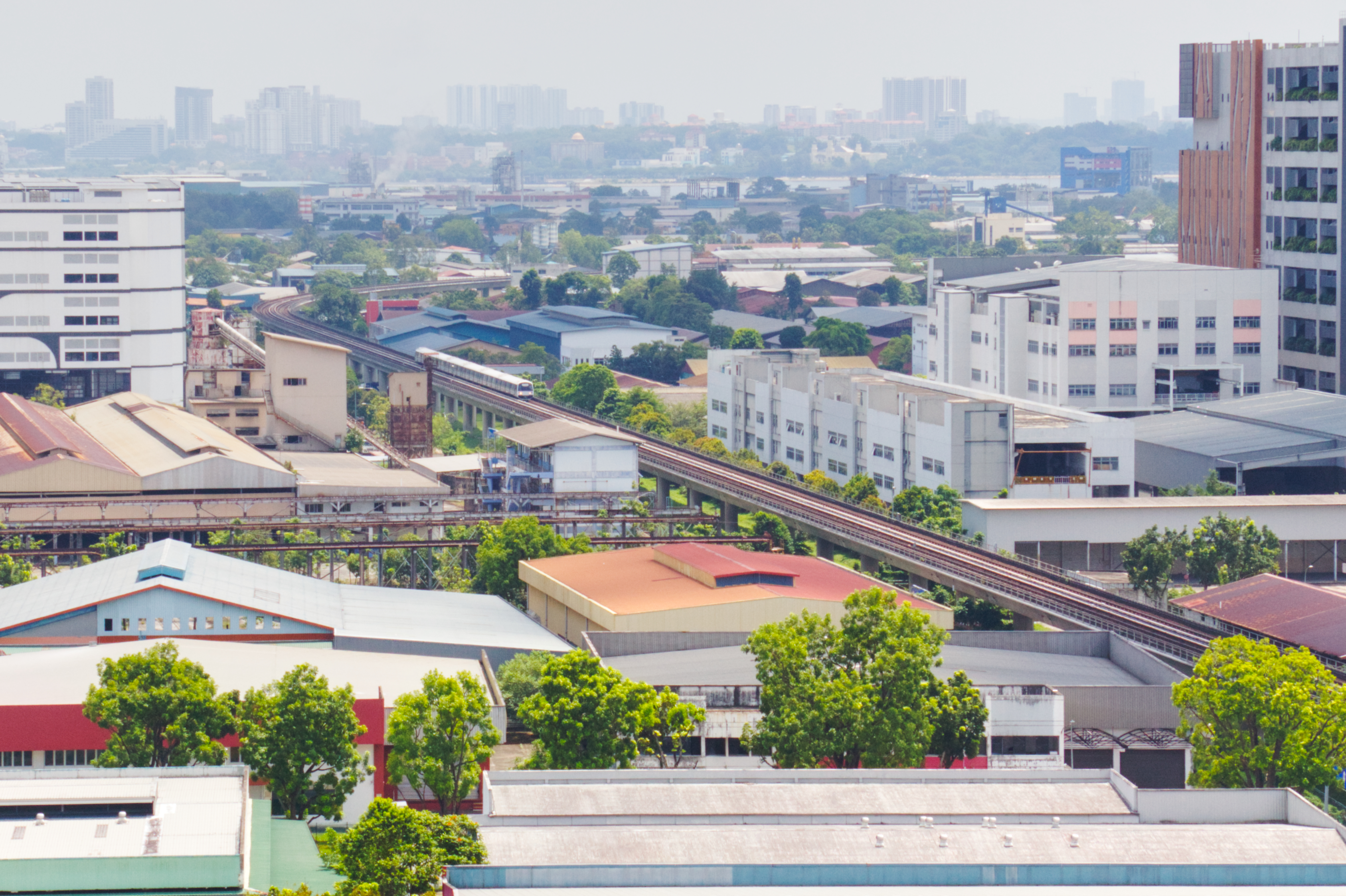
The future station will be built where the train is.

=== Planning ===
When the NSL Woodlands Extension was announced in the 1990s, Sungei Kadut (then named Kadut under station code N19) was unveiled as a provisional station as part of the extension. The station was planned to only be built in conjunction with the redevelopment of the Sungei Kadut Industrial Estate.

In LTMP 2040, LTA announced that Sungei Kadut station will be built as an infill station between Kranji and Yew Tee stations, serving upcoming industrial developments in the area by JTC Corporation and the 18 hectares (0.18 km^{2}) Agri-Food Innovation Park. In addition, the station will interchange with the DTL, serving as the line's new western terminus after it is extended from Bukit Panjang station. Sungei Kadut will be the third purpose-built station connecting both elevated and underground rail services, after Sengkang and Punggol.

=== Construction ===
On 15 January 2026, the contract for the tunnelling works between DE1 and Sungei Kadut stations was awarded to a joint venture between Woh Hup Engineering Pte Ltd and Underground Technology Engineering Construction Pte Ltd for S$326 million (US$243.97 million). The contract for the design and construction of the station was awarded to a joint venture between Samwoh Corporation and China Communications Construction Company the following month, at a sum of S$450 million (US$336.77 million). Originally scheduled to begin by end-2025, construction of the station will start in Q2 2026 with completion in 2035. Additionally, LTA is studying a 1.5 kilometres (0.93 mi) viaduct to connect the NSL to Gali Batu Depot which currently serves the DTL only.
