= DE1 MRT station =

Future MRT station in Singapore

DE1
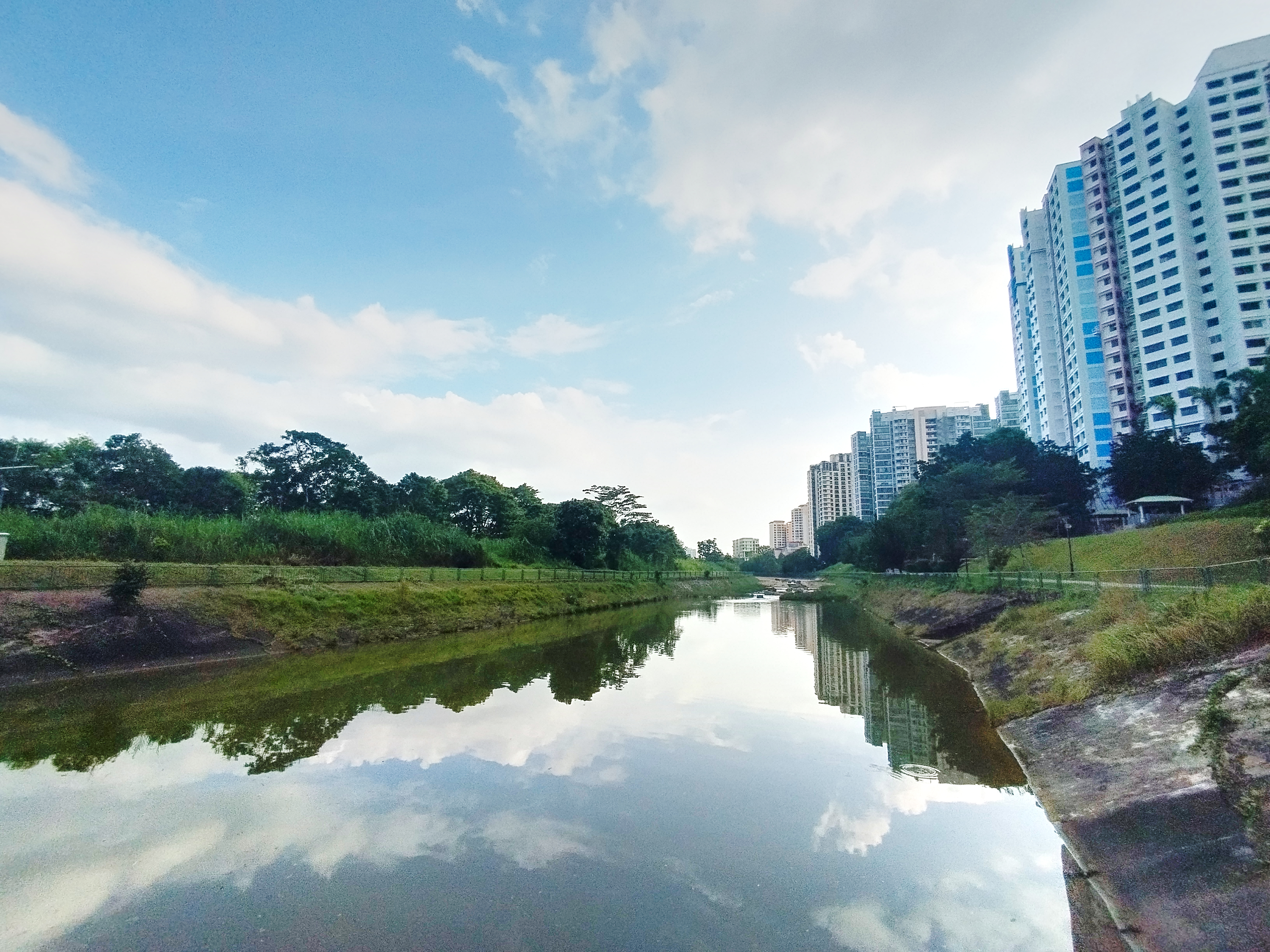
- Site of the future station across the canal

General information
- Coordinates: 1°23′59″N 103°45′09″E
- System: Future Mass Rapid Transit (MRT) station
- Owner: Land Transport Authority
- Operator: SBS Transit
- Line: Downtown Line

Construction
- Structure type: Underground
- Accessible: Yes

History
- Opening: 2035; 9 years' time

Services
Preceding station	Mass Rapid Transit	Following station
Sungei Kadut Terminus	Downtown Line Future service	Bukit Panjang towards Sungei Bedok
Location
- Location within Singapore Rail

A currently unnamed underground Mass Rapid Transit station in Singapore, coded as DE1, was announced on 6 January 2025. Located in Sungei Kadut, it will serve the Downtown Line (DTL) upon its expected opening in 2035.

== History ==
=== Planning ===
The concept of a northern DTL extension to the North–South Line was first touted in the Land Transport Authority's Land Transport Master Plan (LTMP) 2040. Opening by 2035, the station was officially announced alongside Sungei Kadut MRT station on 6 January 2025. With no working name announced, the station is codenamed DE1. It is part of a 4-kilometre extension of the DTL from Bukit Panjang, with construction set to begin in the fourth quarter of 2025.

A vehicular and pedestrian bridge will be built to link DE1 to Choa Chu Kang North 7 and Woodlands Road. The station will also be accessible via an additional pedestrian overhead bridge to Yew Tee and cycling paths.

=== Construction ===
On 15 January 2026, Contract 991 for tunnelling works between DE1 and Sungei Kadut stations was awarded to a joint venture between Woh Hup Engineering Pte Ltd and Underground Technology Engineering Construction Pte Ltd, at a sum of S$326 million (US$243.97 million). Contract 992 for the design and construction of the station was awarded to Woh Hup Engineering the following month, at a sum of S$285 million (US$213.29 million). The contract also includes the construction of the vehicular and pedestrian bridges over Pang Sua Canal. The final contract, Contract 993 for tunnelling works between Bukit Panjang and DE1 stations, was awarded in March to China Railway Tunnel Group Co. Ltd, at a sum of S$199 million (US$148.93 million). Originally scheduled to begin by end-2025, construction of the station will instead start in the second quarter of 2026, with completion in 2035.
