= Yew Tee MRT station =

Mass Rapid Transit station in Singapore

Yew Tee NS5 油池 இயூ டீ
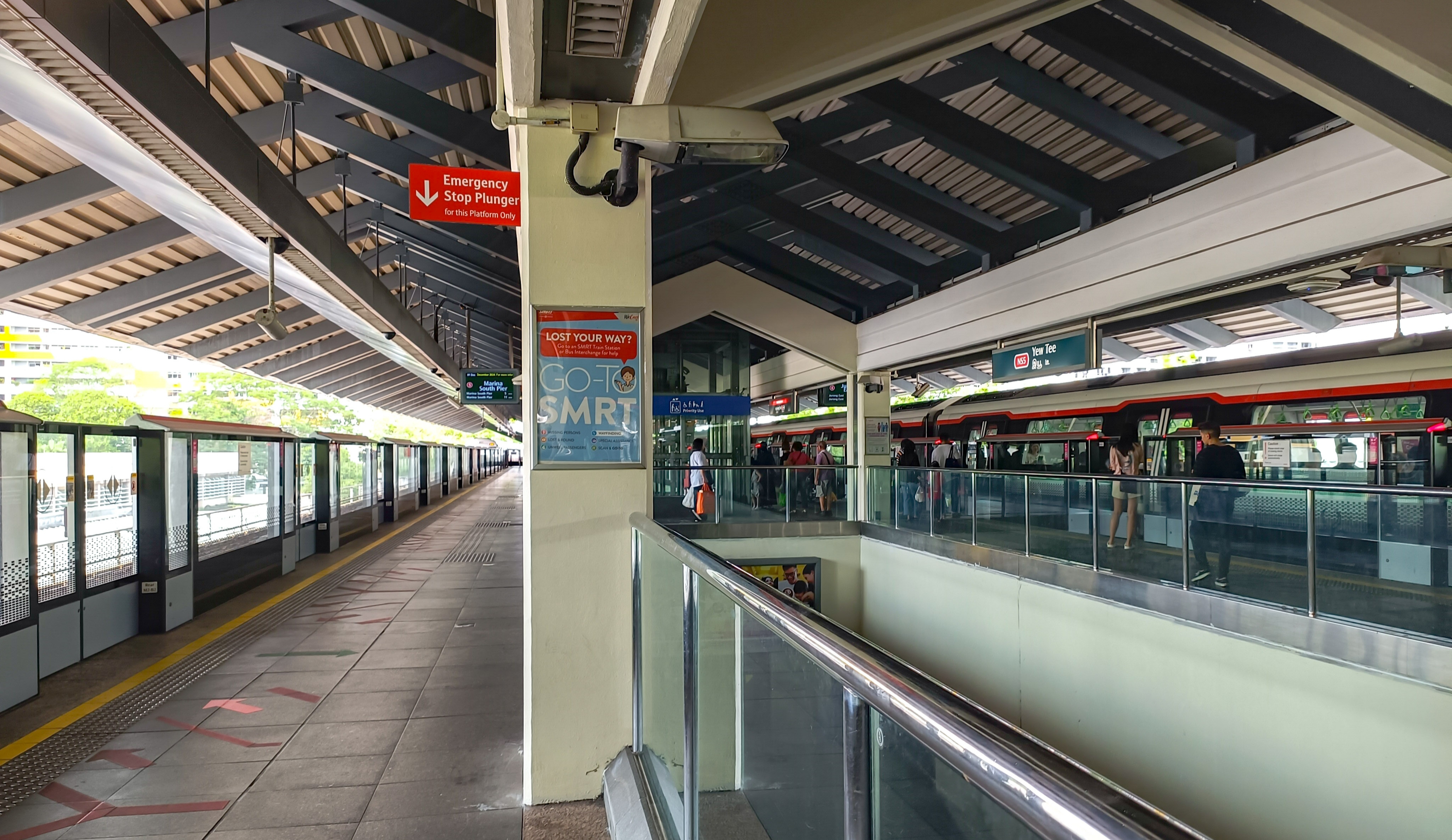
- Platform level of the station

General information
- Location: 61 Choa Chu Kang Drive; Singapore 689715
- Coordinates: E1°23′51″N 103°44′51″E
- System: Mass Rapid Transit (MRT) station
- Operator: SMRT Trains Ltd (SMRT Corporation)
- Line: North–South Line
- Platforms: 2 (1 island platform)
- Tracks: 2
- Connections: Bus, Taxi

Construction
- Structure type: Elevated
- Platform levels: 1
- Cycle facilities: Yes
- Accessible: Yes

History
- Opened: 10 February 1996; 30 years ago
- Former names: Choa Chu Kang North

Passengers
- June 2024: 27,473 per day

Services
| Preceding station | Mass Rapid Transit | Following station |
|---|---|---|
| Choa Chu Kang towards Jurong East | North–South Line | Kranji towards Marina South Pier |
| Choa Chu Kang towards Jurong East | North–South Line Future service | Sungei Kadut towards Marina South Pier |
Track layout
Location
- Location within Singapore Rail

Yew Tee MRT station is an above-ground Mass Rapid Transit (MRT) station on the North–South Line (NSL) in Yew Tee, Singapore. Operated by SMRT Corporation, the station serves various nearby landmarks such as Unity Secondary School and Yew Tee Point. Like most stations on the Woodlands extension, it has a kampong-style roof and a colour scheme designed to blend in with its surroundings.

The station was first announced as Choa Chu Kang North in February 1991, where it would be built as part of the Woodlands extension of the NSL. It was renamed Yew Tee in November 1991. Construction for Yew Tee began by July 1993 and was completed in October 1994. Yew Tee station opened on 10 February 1996. Half-height platform screen doors and high-volume low-speed fans were installed by August 2011 and the first quarter of 2013, respectively.

== History ==
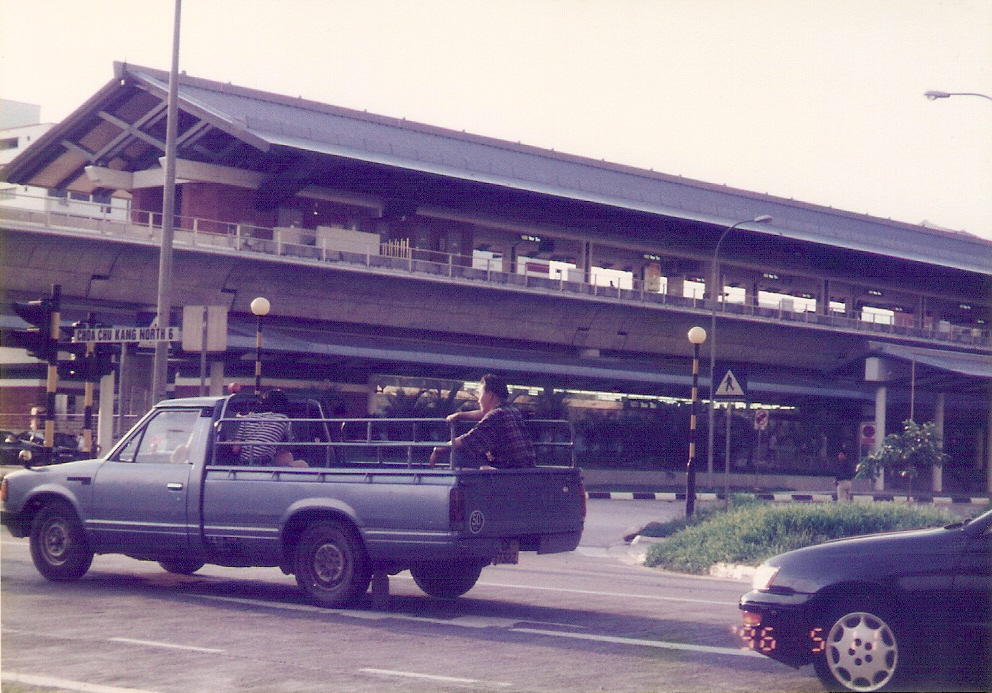
Yew Tee station shortly after opening in 1996

Whilst the Mass Rapid Transit (MRT) system was halfway through construction, plans for an extension of the North–South Line (NSL) from Yishun to Woodlands were conceptualised by the Mass Rapid Transit Corporation (MRTC) in March 1988, with a study carried out two months earlier to assess the viability of the extension. In February 1991, the MRTC announced that the extension, called the Woodlands extension, would start construction by the end of the year, as well as connect Yishun and Choa Chu Kang stations together through Woodlands. Six stations were planned, with Choa Chu Kang North among them.

Eight consultants, which consisted of joint ventures, were considered for the extension's architectural and engineering works by April 1991. By July 1991, the MRTC appointed Parson Brinckerhoff, SAA partnership and KPK Quantity Surveyors as the design consultants. After consulting various groups, Choa Chu Kang North was renamed Yew Tee in November 1991. In December 1992, the contract for Yew Tee and Kranji stations' construction was awarded to Penta Ocean Construction and Hexacon Construction for S$131.5 million (1992) (US$80.73 million). By July 1993, piling works for Yew Tee began, with structural works completed in October 1994. As announced in January 1996 by then-Communications Minister Mah Bow Tan, Yew Tee, along with other stations on the Woodlands extension, were opened on 10 February 1996. Prior to the opening, an open house for the Woodlands extension station was held on 4 February.

Following a rise in track intrusions as well as commuters slipping when rushing for the train, the Land Transport Authority (LTA) and SMRT decided to install half-height platform screen doors (PSD), where it was expected for the works to be completed by 2012. After several tests at different stations, the PSDs were expected to be installed in Yew Tee by 2012, with works starting by August 2011. The works were completed in March 2012. High-volume low-speed fans were also installed in the station by the first quarter of 2013.

== Details ==
Yew Tee station is on the NSL with the station number NS5, situated between Choa Chu Kang and Kranji stations. When it first opened, it had the station number N20 before being changed to its current station number in August 2001 as part of a system-wide campaign to accommodate the expanding MRT network. As part of the NSL, the station is operated by SMRT Corporation. Like other stations on the Woodlands extension, Yew Tee is elevated. The station operates between 5:30 am and 12:50 am from Monday to Saturday, and until 1:20 am on Sundays and public holidays. Train frequencies range from 2–5 minutes during peak hours to average 5 minutes during off-peak hours. The station is wheelchair accessible and provides bicycle facilities.

Yew Tee station was named after Yew Tee village, formerly located off Woodlands Road. According to one resident, the village's name originated from oil stored there during the Japanese occupation of Singapore. The station runs alongside Choa Chu Kang Drive and has four exits serving surrounding amenities such as Unity Secondary School, Yew Tee Primary School, Yew Tee Point, and Yew Tee Square.

Like most other stations on the Woodlands extension, Yew Tee has a kampong-style roof and a colour scheme designed to blend in with its surroundings. Its platform is also larger than those of previous stations as its electrical maintenance room was relocated to the concourse. The station's bus bays, measuring 36 metres (118 ft) long, are longer than those at previous stations. Similarly, its commercial space is larger than at previous stations, with the MRTC believing that businesses would move in due to the station's location, existing commercial space already occupied in other stations, and the expected influx of people moving to Woodlands and Sembawang.
