= Bombardier Movia C951 =

Class of electric multiple units in Singapore

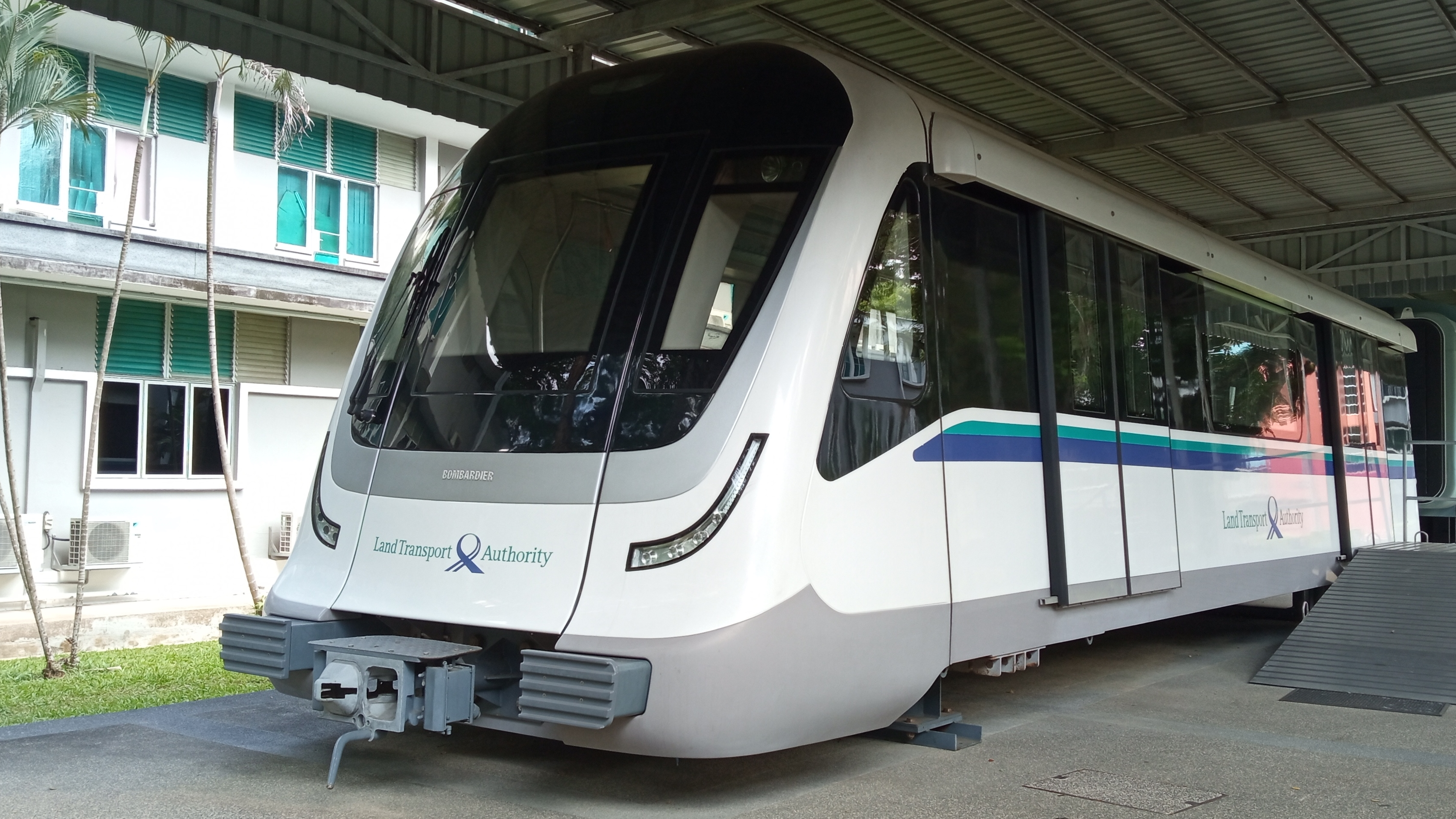
- Exterior mockup of the C951

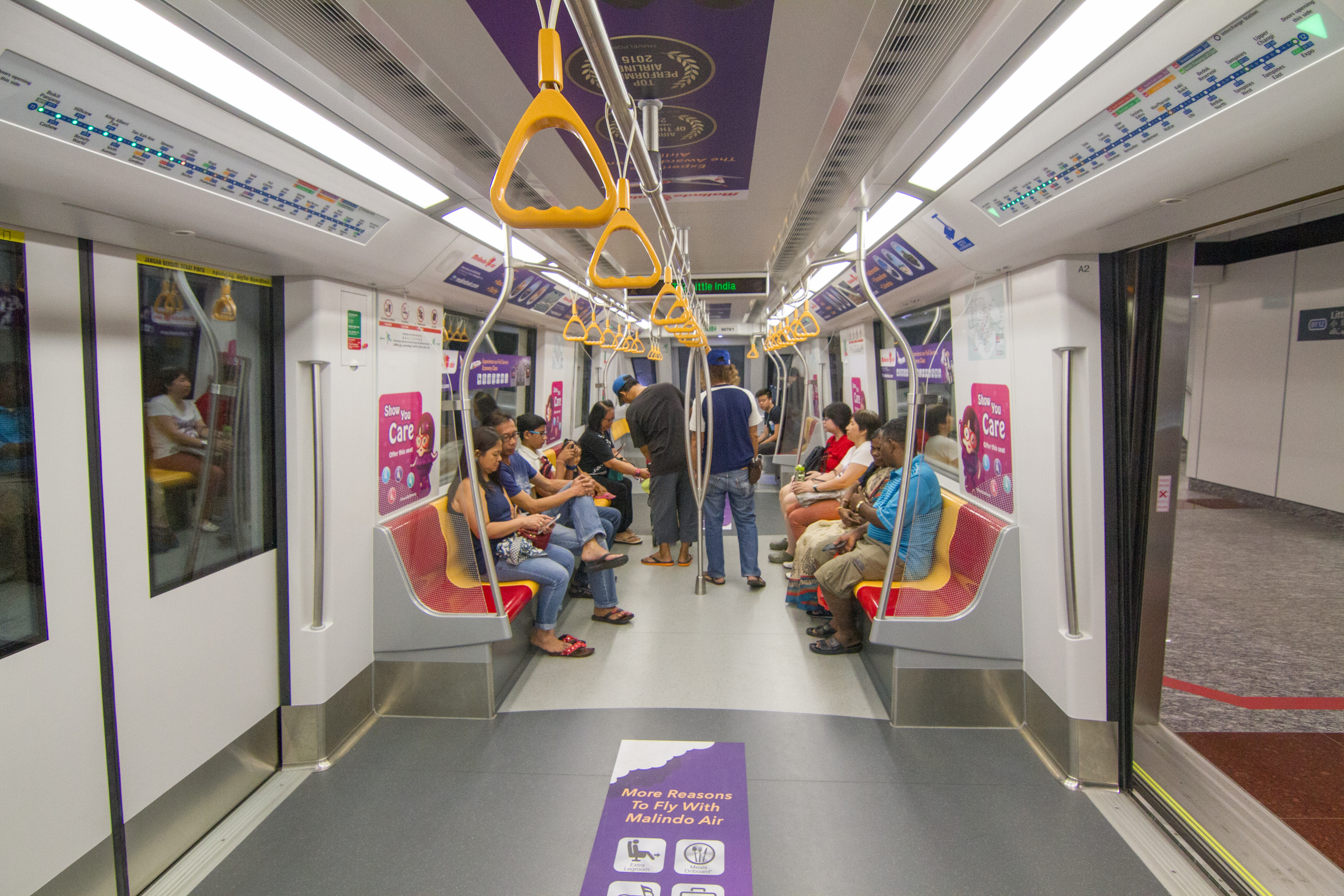
- Interior of a C951 train.
- Stock type: Electric multiple unit
- In service: 22 December 2013; 12 years ago – Present
- Manufacturers: Changchun Bombardier Railway Vehicles (Bombardier Transportation and CNR/CRRC Changchun)
- Built at: Changchun, China
- Family name: Movia
- Constructed: 2011 – 2017
- Entered service: 22 December 2013; 12 years ago
- Number built: 276 Vehicles (92 Sets)
- Number in service: 276 Vehicles (92 Sets)
- Formation: 3 per trainset DM1–T–DM2
- Fleet numbers: 9001 – 9092
- Capacity: 931 Passengers
- Operator: SBS Transit
- Depots: Gali Batu; Tai Seng
- Line served: Downtown Line

Specifications
- Car body construction: Welded aluminium
- Train length: 70.1 m (229 ft 11 7/8 in)
- Car length: 23.65 m (77 ft 7 1/8 in) (DM); 22.8 m (74 ft 9 5/8 in) (T)
- Width: 3.2 m (10 ft 6 in)
- Height: 3.68 m (12 ft 7/8 in)
- Doors: 1,450 mm (57 1/8 in), 8 per car, 4 per side
- Wheel diameter: 840 mm (33 in) (new)
- Wheelbase: 2.5 m (8 ft 2 in)
- Maximum speed: 90 km/h (56 mph) (design); 80 km/h (50 mph) (service)
- Weight: 38.3 t (37.7 long tons; 42.2 short tons) per car
- Traction system: Bombardier MITRAC (1000 series) IGBT–VVVF
- Traction motors: 8 × 180 kW (240 hp) totally enclosed fan-cooled permanent-magnet synchronous motor
- Power output: 1.44 MW (1,930 hp)
- Gearbox: Bombardier DR1200
- Acceleration: 1.1 m/s^{2} (2.5 mph/s)
- Deceleration: 1.1 m/s^{2} (2.5 mph/s) (service); 1.4 m/s^{2} (3.1 mph/s) (emergency)
- Auxiliaries: Mitsubishi HF-IBT190A IGBT Auxiliary Power Supply Box
- Electric systems: 750 V DC third rail
- Current collection: Collector shoe
- UIC classification: Bo′Bo′+2′2′+Bo′Bo′
- Bogies: FLEXX Metro 3100
- Braking systems: Regenerative, rheostatic and pneumatic (Knorr-Bremse)
- Safety systems: Siemens Trainguard Sirius moving block CBTC ATC under ATO GoA 4 (UTO), with subsystems of ATP, Controlguide Rail 9000 ATS and Trackguard Westrace MK2 CBI
- Coupling system: Scharfenberg
- Track gauge: 1,435 mm (4 ft 8 1/2 in) standard gauge

The Bombardier MOVIA C951 is the first generation electric multiple unit rolling stock in operation on the Downtown Line of Singapore's Mass Rapid Transit (MRT) system. The contract was won by Bombardier Transportation and the rolling stock was built by Changchun Bombardier Railway Vehicles (joint venture of Bombardier Transportation and CNR/CRRC Changchun). Initially, the authorities had ordered 73 trains, although LTA had ordered an additional 15 trains and a final 4 more trains under C951A which makes a total of 92 trainsets were manufactured under C951.

== Tender ==
The tender for trains under the contract turnkey 951 was closed in June 2008. The tender results was published on Nov 2008.

S/N	Name of Tenderer	Amount (S$)
1	Alstom Transport S.A. / Alstom Transport (S) Pte Ltd Consortium	934,489,472.00
2	Bombardier (Singapore) Pte Ltd	547,308,888.00
3	Kawasaki Heavy Industries, Ltd. / Kawasaki Heavy Industries(Singapore) Pte Ltd & CRRC Qingdao Sifang Consortium / Singapore CRRC Sifang Railway Vehicles Service Pte. Ltd. Consortium	682,436,399.00
4	Hyundai Rotem Company	1,004,771,958.00
5	Kinki Sharyo Co., Ltd	Did not submit

Note: Awarded amount to Bombardier as announced by LTA is at S$570.7 million, due to the exercise of an option for medium-frequency auxiliary inverters

== History ==
73 trainsets consisting of three cars each were purchased at a cost of approximately S$570.7 million for passenger service. Bombardier beat Alstom, Kawasaki Heavy Industries and Hyundai Rotem in the tendering process as the lowest cost offered. The tender for trains under the contract turnkey 951 was closed in June 2008, and awarded in November 2008.

Land Transport Authority later placed an additional order of 15 trainsets in 2013 at an approximate value of $119.2 million. LTA had increased the variation order from 15 to 19, therefore bringing the total trainsets to 92. A partial number of the total fleet operates on the Stage 1 of Downtown Line since 22 December 2013. All 92 trains had completed their manufacturing in Changchun Bombardier Railway Vehicles factory, with some of them awaiting for their delivery into Singapore by mid-2017. The first C951 train arrived in Singapore in October 2012.

=== Delivery ===
These trains were delivered until 2017. They are currently stabled at Gali Batu Depot, Kim Chuan Depot, Tai Seng Facility Building and the future East Coast Integrated Depot.

On 12 October 2012, the first of 11 trains for the Downtown Line Stage 1 arrived at Jurong Port and transported to Kim Chuan Depot to undergo testing by LTA before it is handed over to SBS Transit.

By 28 February 2013, Bombardier had delivered nine of the 11 trains for Downtown Line Stage 1. LTA together with the operator, SBS Transit conducted the necessary tests to ensure safety standards, functional performance and systems compatibility requirements are met before revenue service of the DTL1 which began on 22 December 2013. The last train was delivered in May 2016.

== Features ==
=== Design ===
The C951 trains include several features that were not seen in previous existing trains.

New features include:

- an ergonomic seat profile;
- red reserved seats, which allows for clearer separation between normal and reserved seats;
- perch seats, replacing the two-seaters at the ends of the car

The train will also retain existing features like having three rows of poles and hand grips, and vertical poles which split into three at the center.

=== Dynamic Route Map Display ===
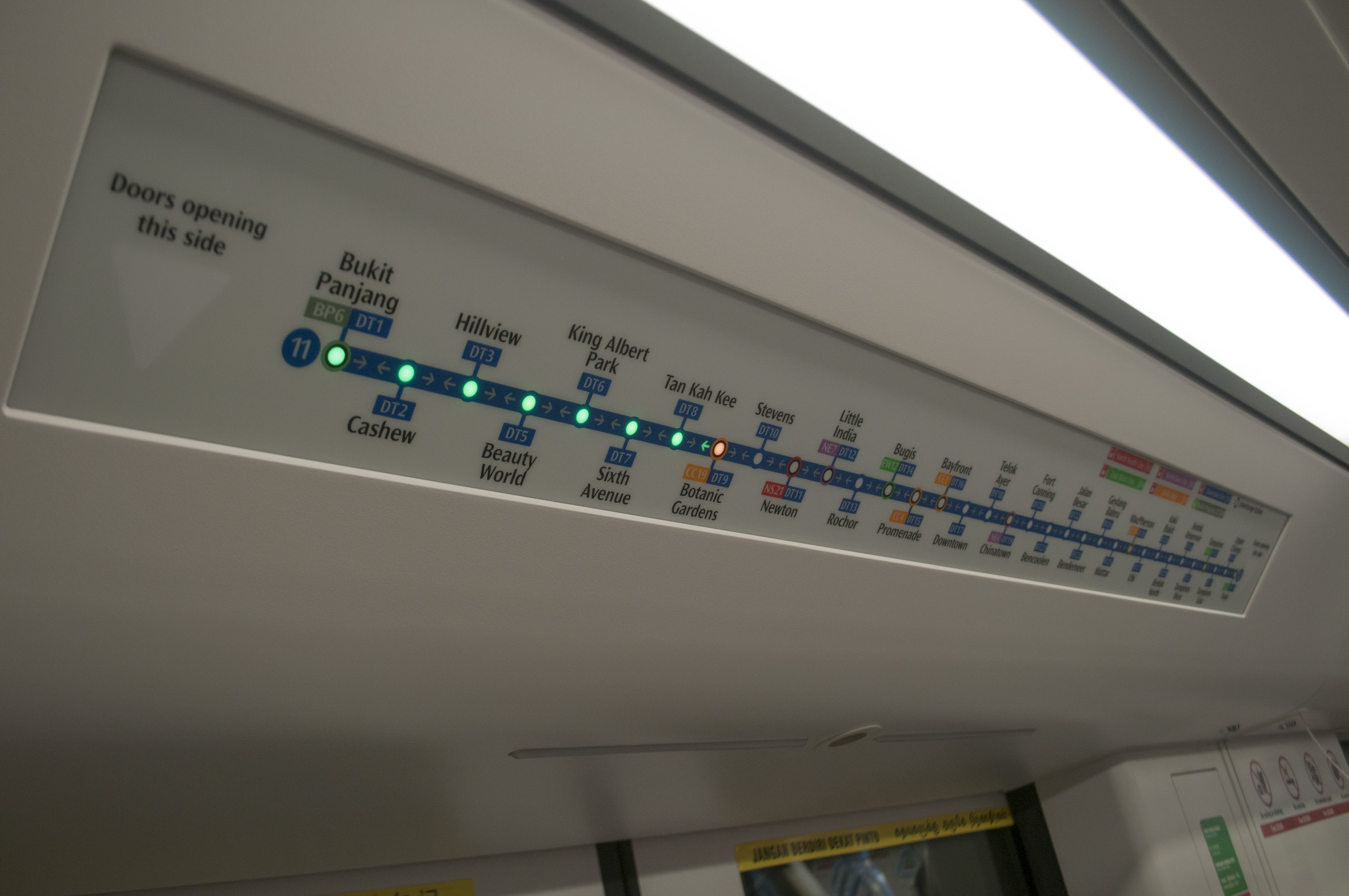
The original DRMD of the C951.

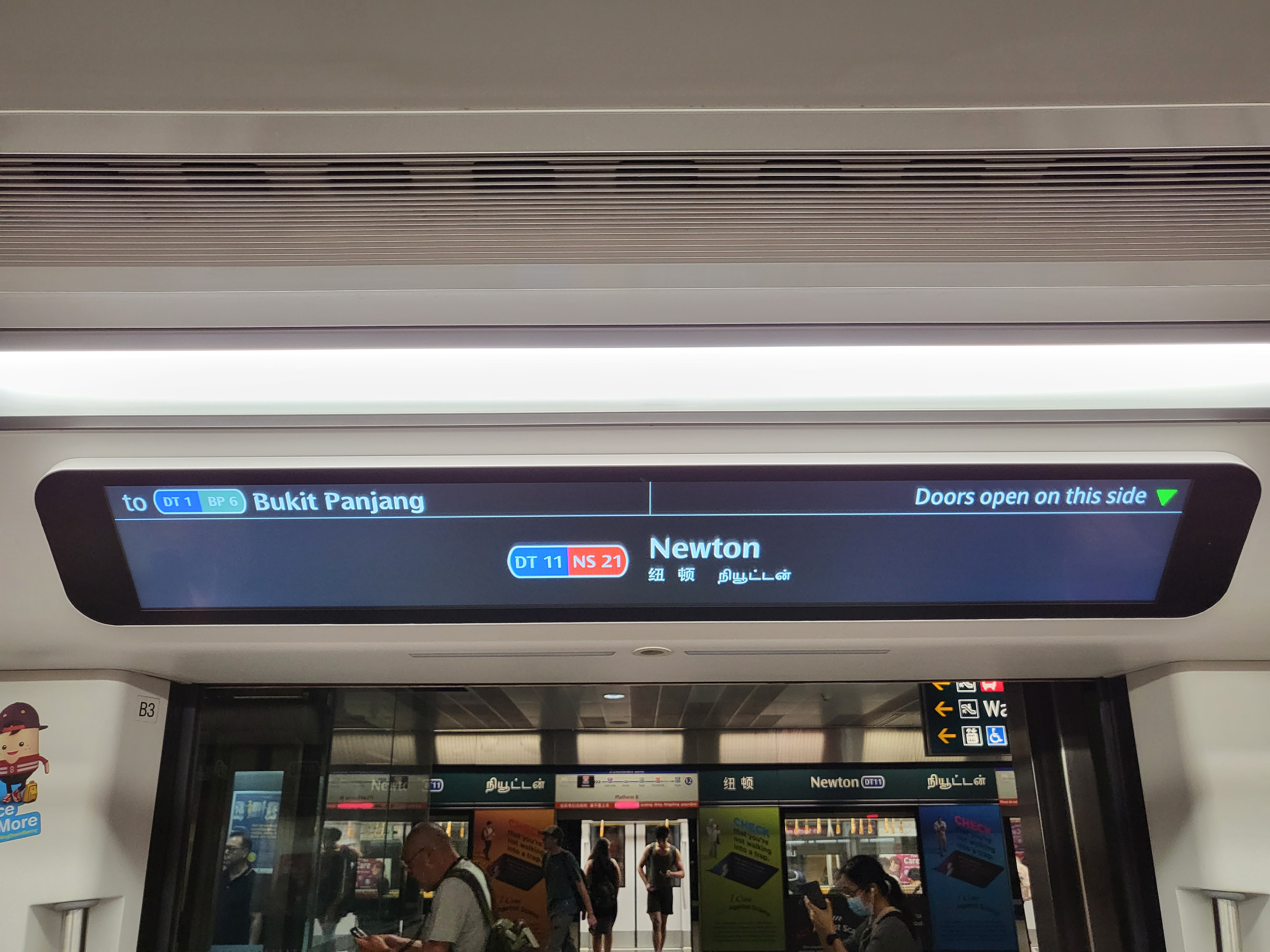
Upgraded DRMD of the C951.

Bombardier announced their intention to upgrade the DRMD from the original LED system to an LCD system in 2020, in order to accommodate future extensions to the Downtown Line. These retrofitted LCD Dynamic Route Map Display (DRMD) is similar to that on newer MRT trains such as the T251, R151 and refurbished C751A trains. The first retrofitted C951 train with the LCD system entered service on 2 July 2023.

=== LCD Displays ===
C951 trains are also equipped with LCDs at each carriage, with a total of 18 LCDd on each train. They show advertisements, movie trailers and informercials related to the Downtown Line.

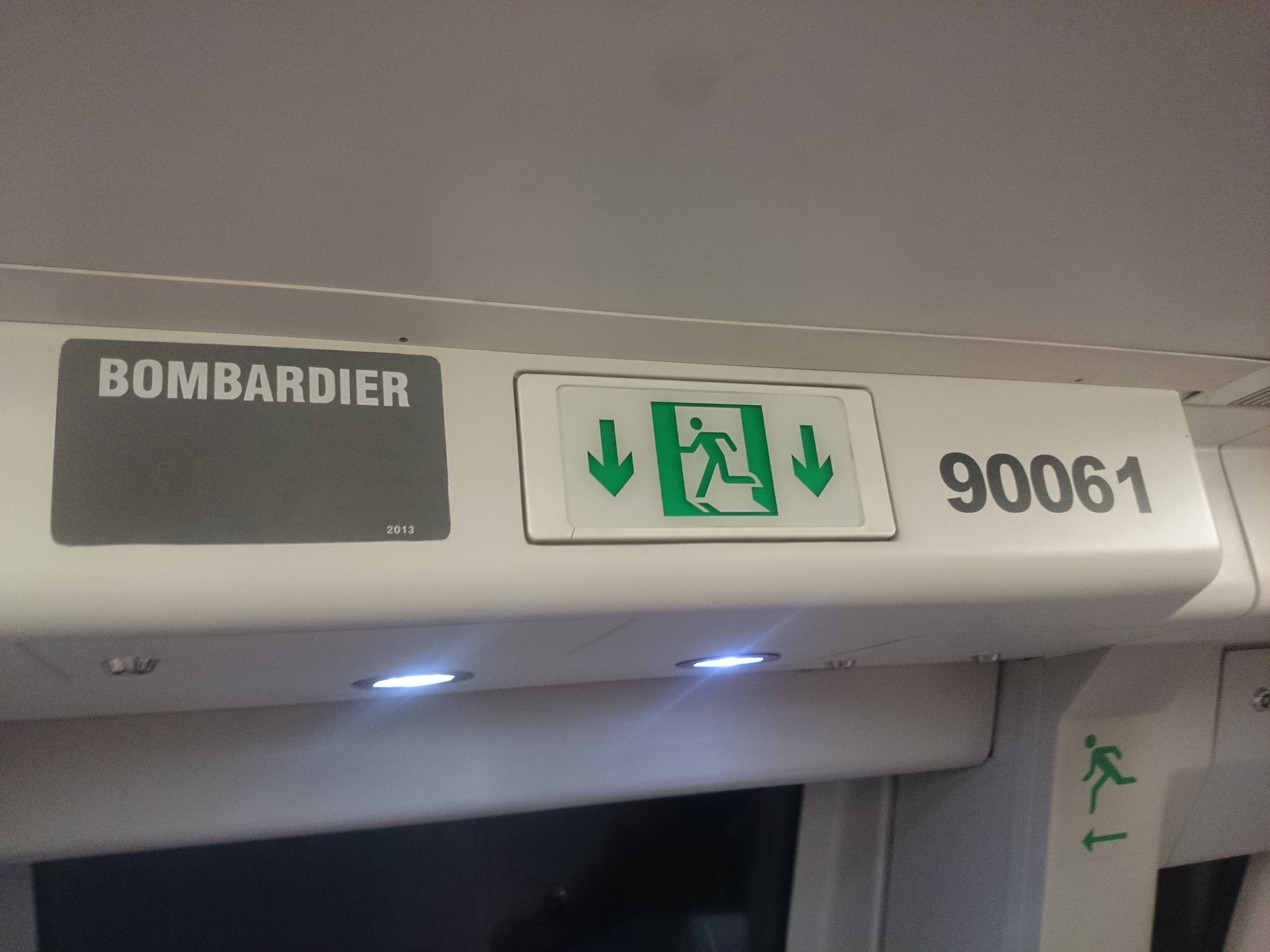
A builder's plate, which also functions as a one-way mirror concealing a security camera

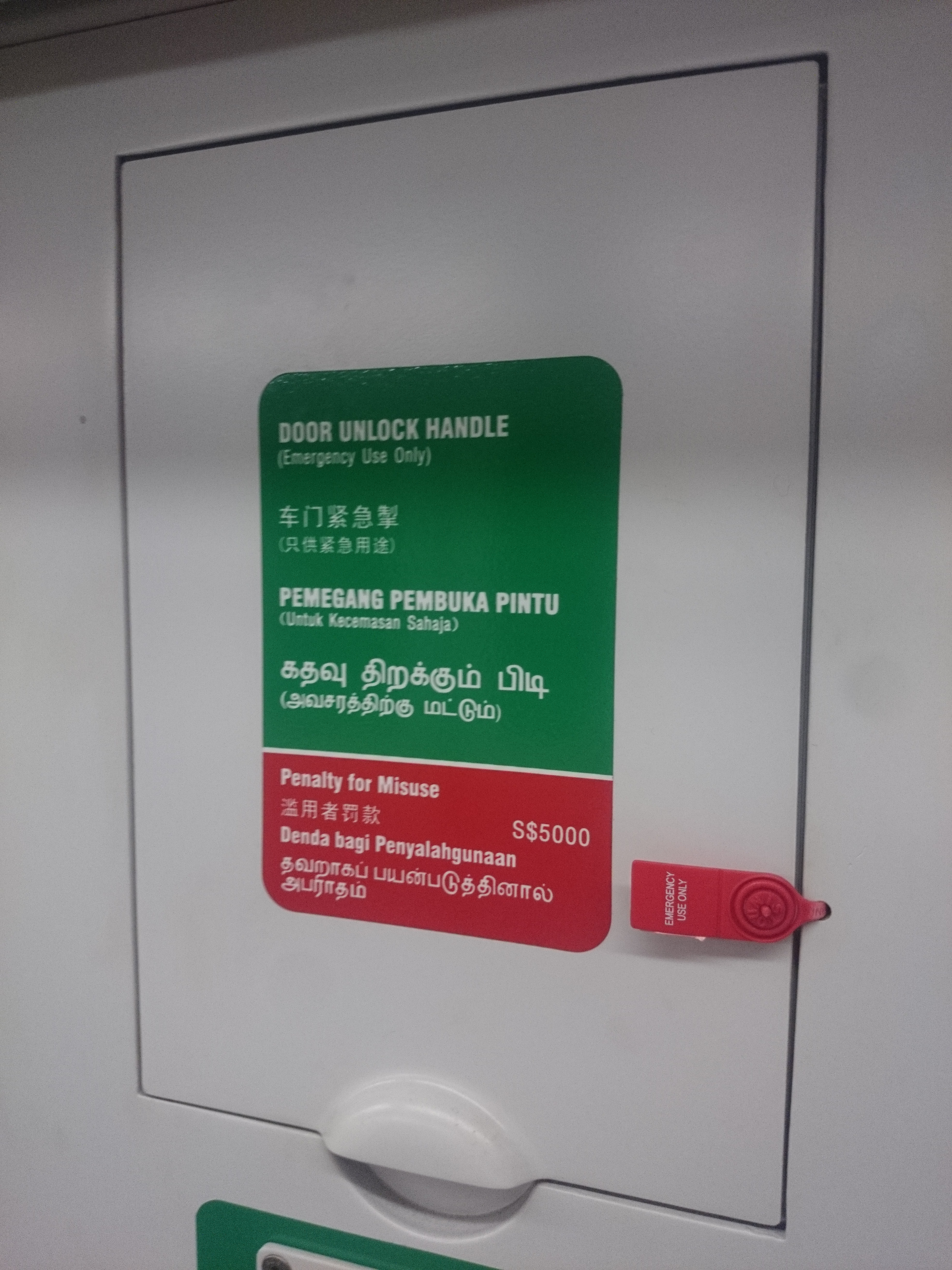
Emergency door unlock of the C951

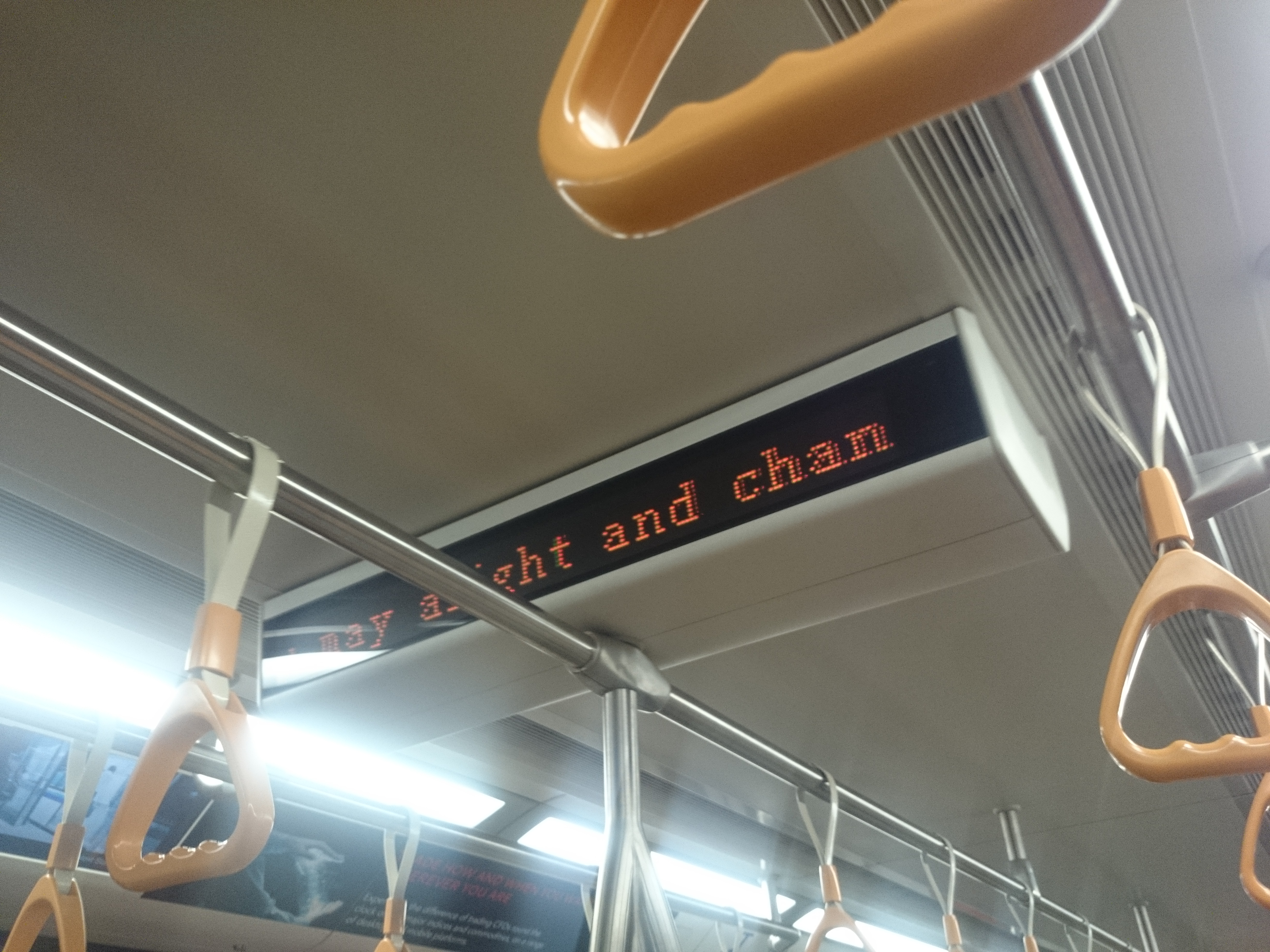
LED display on a C951 train

=== Automatic Track Inspection (ATI) ===
Four of the C951 trains also have their bogies installed with the ATI, which is a system of cameras, lasers, and sensors installed on trains that help to detect defects like rail cracks or missing fasteners.

== Train formation ==
The coupling configuration of a C951 trainset in revenue service is DM1–T–DM2, permanently coupled. D stands for "driver's desk", M for "motor" and T for "trailer".

Cars of C951
Car Type	Quantity	Driver Cab	Motor	Collector Shoe	Car Length		Wheelchair Bay
Car Type	Quantity	Driver Cab	Motor	Collector Shoe	m	ft in	Wheelchair Bay
DM	2	✓	✓	✓	23.65	77 ft 7.1 in	✗
T	1	✗	✗	✓	22.8	74 ft 9.6 in	✓

The car numbers of the trains range from 9001x to 9092x where x depends on the carriage type. For example, set 9003 consists of cars 90031 (DM1), 90032 (T), and 90033 (DM2).
