= Yew Tee =

Place in Marsiling-Yew Tee GRC, Singapore

- Subzone of Choa Chu Kang Planning Area & Housing Estate

Name transcription(s)
  - Chinese: 油池; Yóuchí (Pinyin); Iû-tî (Hokkien POJ); Iû-tî (Teochew PUJ)
  - Malay: Yew Tee
  - Tamil: இயூ டீ Iyū ṭī (Transliteration)
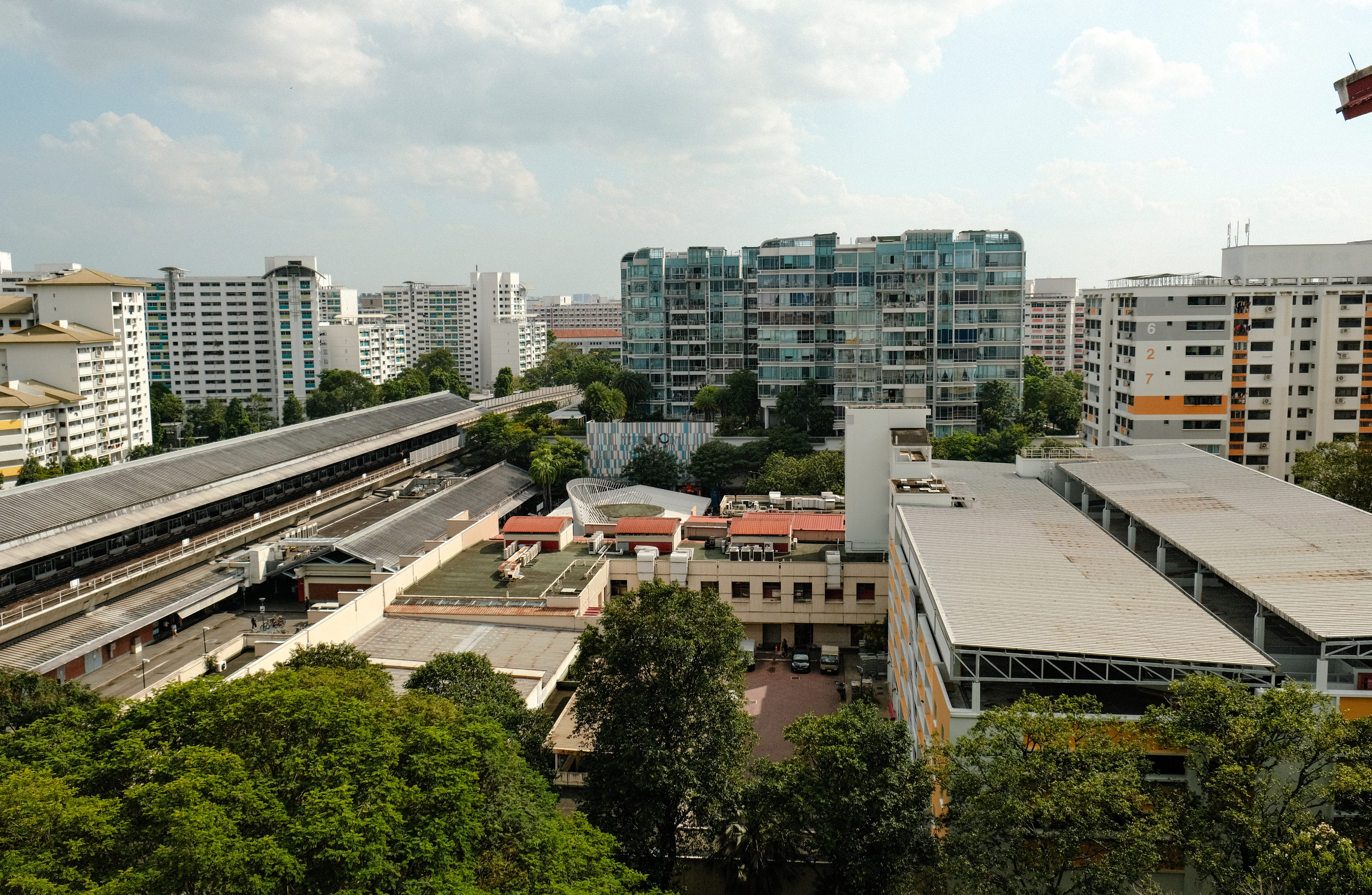
- Aerial view of the town centre in 2025
- Interactive map of Yew Tee
- Coordinates: 1.3976°N 103.7463°E
- Country: Singapore
- Constituency: Marsiling-Yew Tee GRC
- CDC: North West CDC

Government
  - Member of Parliament: Lawrence Wong; Alex Yam
  - Mayor: Alex Yam

Area
  - Total: 0.92 km^{2} (0.36 sq mi)

Population (2026)
  - Total: 38,500
  - Density: 42,000/km^{2} (110,000/sq mi)

Yew Tee is a residential area in the West Region of Singapore. Yew Tee is a cluster of Housing and Development Board flats and private condominiums. Yew Tee is part of the subdivision of Choa Chu Kang.

== Etymology and history ==
Yew Tee is originally a village off Woodlands Road, near present-day Gali Batu Depot. During the Japanese Occupation of Singapore, oil was stored in the village and the village became known as Yew Tee (油池, Peng'im: iu5 di5, lit. "oil pond" in Teochew).

The village used to have more than 300 families residing there which consists mostly of farmers growing vegetables and rearing ducks and chickens. In the 1980s, development of the area led to the villagers moving away from Yew Tee. Yew Tee became a household name with the construction of the Yew Tee MRT station which is located where the village used to be, near Stagmont Ring.

The Yew Tee Community Centre, set up in 1963 and one of Singapore's oldest community centres, closed down in 1998. The closure was due to under-utilisation which reflects the exodus of population from the area.

The name of the neighbourhood of Limbang ("balance" in Malay) was derived from an old road, Lorong Limbang. Lorongs were common in the past before urban redevelopment such as Lorong Kebasi, Lorong Bistari and Lorong Keduang (present-day Choa Chu Kang Drive).

== Housing ==
As part of the Choa Chu Kang New Town, all the apartments are built after 1993. Yew Tee is divided into two towns - Limbang and Yew Tee. Limbang has a smaller land area than Yew Tee. Yew Tee Point serves Yew Tee residents while Limbang Shopping Centre serves Limbang residents.

== Infrastructure ==
=== Education ===
There are several primary and secondary schools in Yew Tee. Primary schools consist of De La Salle School, Kranji Primary School, Unity Primary School and Yew Tee Primary School. Secondary schools consist of Kranji Secondary School, Regent Secondary School and Unity Secondary School.

=== Transportation ===
Yew Tee has a MRT station, Yew Tee MRT station, opened in 1996 as part of the 16-km Woodlands Extension. The station is part of the city's North-South line. The town is served by public buses such as Service 302 and Service 307 from the Choa Chu Kang Bus Interchange. In Dec 2015 and Mar 2025, under the DTL2 Bukit Panjang Bus Service Enhancements, Service 979 and Service 979X was introduced to provide a vital link for Yew Tee residents to Bukit Panjang, the Downtown Line. There are also new short-haul buses added to bring residents from Choa Chu Kang/Yew Tee to Bukit Panjang MRT Station.

=== Recreation ===
There are 3 parks in Yew Tee, namely Limbang Park, Stagmont Park and Yew Tee Park. There is also a sports complex located within the vicinity of Yew Tee. In March 2009, a new shopping mall and condominium was opened. The shopping mall is known as Yew Tee Point and the condominium is known as Yew Tee Residences. The Pang Sua Canal park connector forms part of the Western Adventure Loop linking various parks in Yew Tee, Choa Chu Kang and Bukit Panjang. In 2019, Minister Lawrence Wong announced plans for a new integrated hub in Yew Tee, known as Heart of Yew Tee. It will house a community club, a 10-storey HDB block catering to seniors, a hawker centre, a polyclinic, a kidney dialysis centre, retail outlets and a community plaza. It is set to be completed in the first quarter of 2027.

== Army camps ==
The Kranji Camp was built in 1994 when Yew Tee was developed. Thereafter, the military police and Kranji Detention Barracks was moved in from the Woodlands Camp in 2000. There was a growing need for the expansion of Kranji Camp, called Kranji Camp II which was built in 2004. The Mowbray Camp and Police Dog K9 Unit were shifted from Ulu Pandan in 2003 to Kranji. The Kranji Camp III was built in 2009 to replace Ayer Rajah Camp and Portsdown Camp due to the redevelopment of the one-north area for the chemical sciences and lifestyle hub.

== Politics ==
The Yew Tee area was currently part of the Marsiling–Yew Tee Group Representation Constituency, first formed in the 2015 election comprising Yew Tee, Kranji and the Marsiling portions of the neighbouring Woodlands. Yew Tee was managed by two MPs, with the current mayor of the North West Community Development Council Alex Yam overseeing the namesake Yew Tee, and the current Prime Minister and Finance Minister Lawrence Wong overseeing the southern Yew Tee known as Limbang.
