= Kranji MRT station =

Mass Rapid Transit station in Singapore

Kranji NS7 克兰芝 கிராஞ்சி
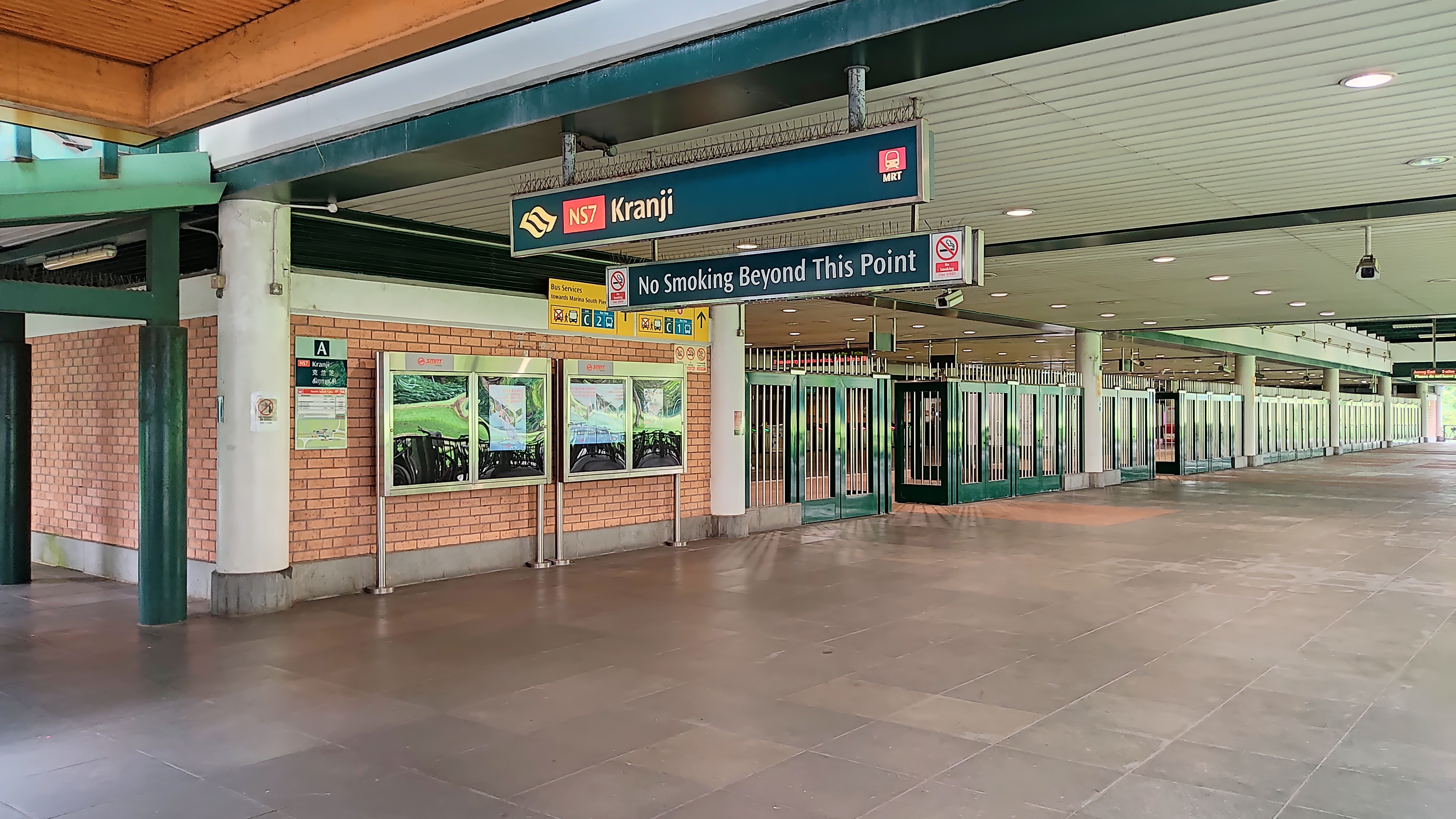
- Exit A of Kranji MRT station

General information
- Location: 960 Woodlands Road; Singapore 738702
- Coordinates: 1°25′30.17″N 103°45′42.67″E
- System: Mass Rapid Transit (MRT) station
- Operator: SMRT Trains Ltd (SMRT Corporation)
- Line: North–South Line
- Platforms: 2 (1 island platform)
- Tracks: 2
- Connections: Bus, taxi

Construction
- Structure type: Elevated
- Platform levels: 1
- Parking: No
- Cycle facilities: Yes
- Accessible: Yes

History
- Opened: 10 February 1996; 30 years ago

Passengers
- June 2024: 27,452 per day

Services
Preceding station	Mass Rapid Transit	Following station
Yew Tee towards Jurong East	North–South Line	Marsiling towards Marina South Pier
Sungei Kadut towards Jurong East	North–South Line Future service	Marsiling towards Marina South Pier
Track layout
Location
- Location within Singapore Rail

Kranji MRT station is an elevated Mass Rapid Transit (MRT) station on the North–South Line (NSL). Situated in Sungei Kadut, Singapore, along Woodlands Road, it serves the Singapore Turf Club and the Woodlands Wafer Fabrication Park. The station is operated by SMRT Trains.

Originally not part of the Woodlands MRT extension plans, Kranji station was later included in November 1992. Completed along with the other Woodlands extension stations on 10 February 1996, it is the largest among the stations, designed to handle a large volume of visitors to the Singapore Turf Club. Designed with a kampung-style roof, the station is integrated with other transportation modes, with bus bays serving cross-border services to Johor Bahru, Malaysia.

== History ==
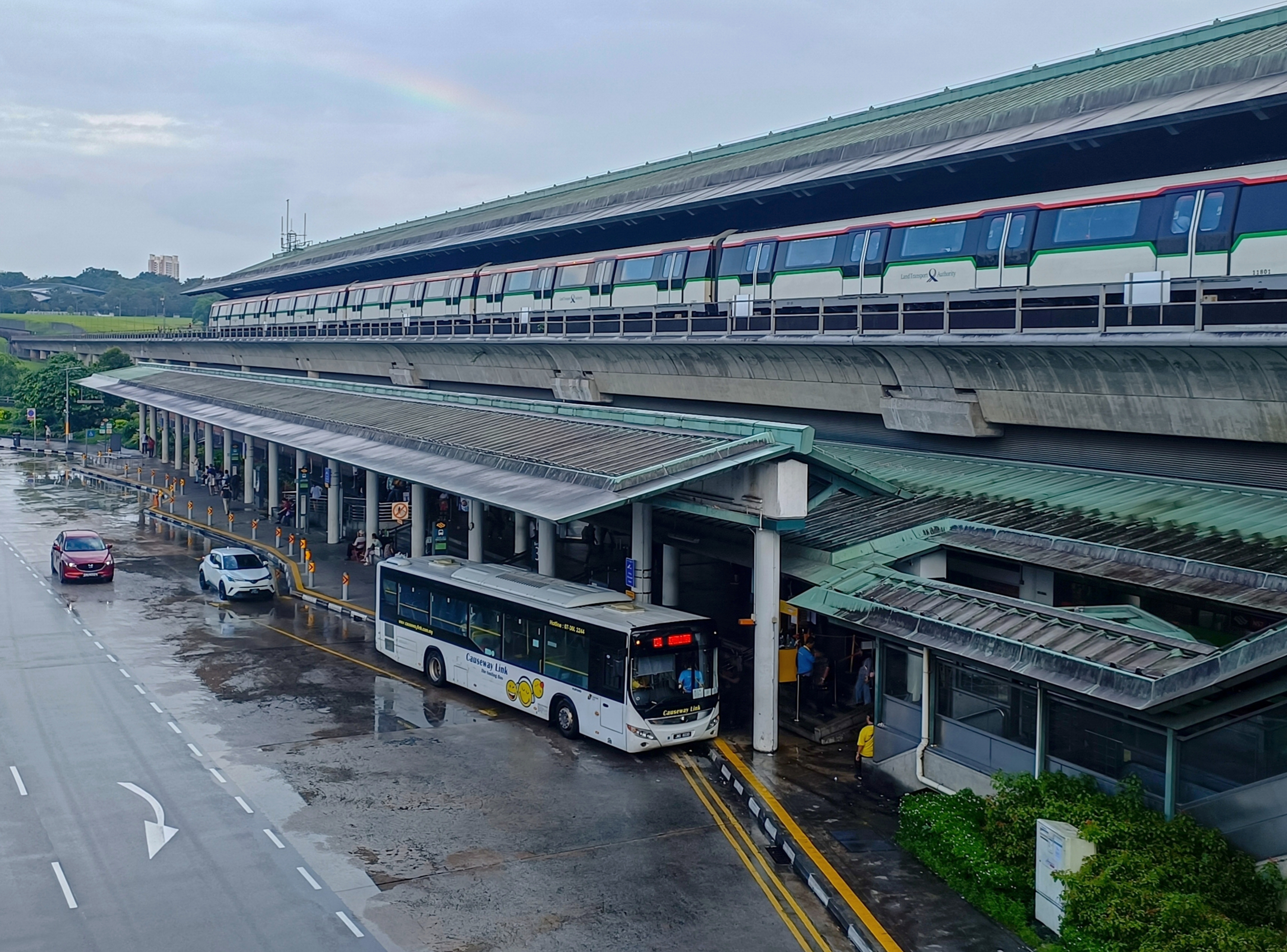
Exterior of the station

The Mass Rapid Transit Corporation (MRTC) first outlined plans for the Woodlands MRT line in March 1988, which was envisioned to connect Yishun and Choa Chu Kang stations via Woodlands. Initially not part of the first four stations announced for the extension, the station was later included on 19 November 1992 to serve future housing estates in the area and the Singapore Turf Club, which was to be relocated near the station to free up land at its original site in Bukit Timah.

Prior to the construction, eight plots of land owned by the Jurong Town Corporation were acquired by the government in September 1991 to construct the segment between Yew Tee and Kranji. In July 1992, part of a hill along Woodlands Avenue 3 had to be removed using explosives to make way for a viaduct connecting between Marsiling and Kranji. The removal of the hill slope took six months and cost S$1.5 million (1992) (US$920,829.16). The contract for the construction of Kranji station, along with the adjacent Yew Tee station, 5.7 kilometres (3.5 miles) of track and two substations, was awarded to a joint venture between Penta Ocean Construction and Hexagon Construction Pte Ltd at S$131.5 million (1992) (US$80.73 million) in December 1992.

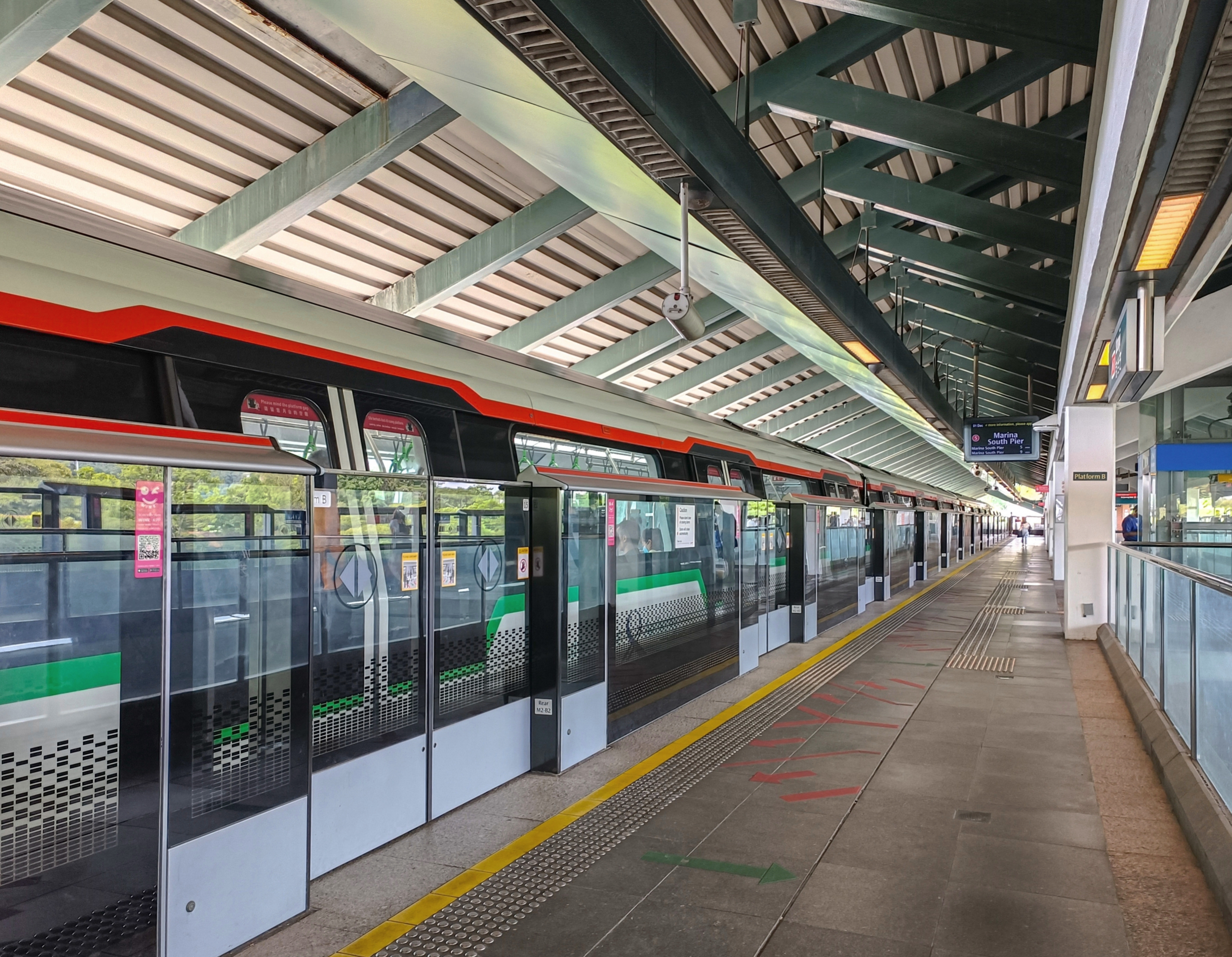
Platform level of the station

In May 1993, then-Communications Minister Mah Bow Tan made his first visit to the station site, along with Marsiling and Sembawang stations. Mah revisited the site on 28 April 1995 along with the Mass Rapid Transit Corporation (MRTC) chairman Wesley D'aranjo and Minister of State for Communications Goh Chee Wee. The station opened on 10 February 1996 along with the other stations on the Woodlands extension.

Kranji station was the last station to have half-height platform screen doors installed on 14 March 2012 as part of the Land Transport Authority's (LTA) programme to improve safety in MRT stations. Between 2012 and 2013, high-volume low-speed fans were installed at this station as part of a network-wide programme to improve ventilation at the platforms of elevated stations. As part of efforts to improve the overall accessibility of public transport, the overhead pedestrian bridge near Kranji and other stations (Note: The other stations are Aljunied, Bishan, Khatib, Sengkang, and Yew Tee.) had lifts installed to improve barrier-free accessibility to major transport nodes. The lifts were installed progressively in 2013.

During the evening peak of 3 June 2024, train services on the NSL from Choa Chu Kang to Woodlands were disrupted as a lightning strike damaged a power control box near the station, causing a power trip. A small fire had ignited in the control box, but extinguished by itself when the Singapore Civil Defence Force arrived. The damaged box had since been replaced.

== Station details ==
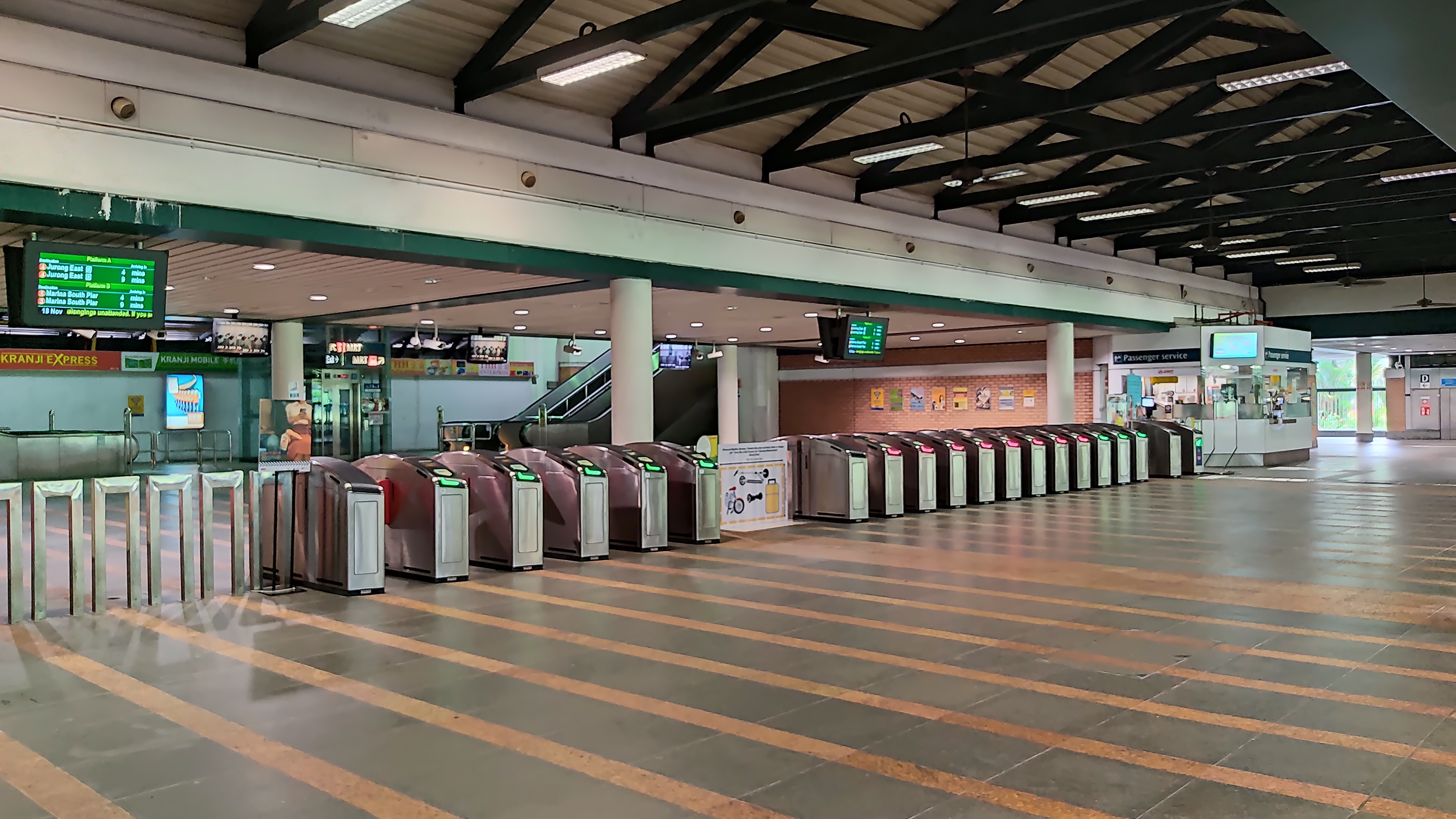
The spacious concourse level of the station

Kranji station serves the North–South Line and is situated between the Yew Tee and Marsiling stations. The official station code is NS7. Being part of the NSL, the station is operated by SMRT Trains. Situated along Woodlands Road, the station has four entrances. Kranji station is linked to the nearby Singapore Turf Club via a sheltered walkway and is close to Takeda Singapore Manufacturing Plant, the Kranji Water Reclamation Plant, and the Woodlands Wafer Fabrication Park. The station is opened from 5:08 am and closes at 1:10 am daily. When the station is closed, the last train will be routed to any station in and between Jurong East and Kranji for overnight parking without the need to travel to depot and is staffed by overnight train drivers.

Like all stations on the Woodlands extension, it has a kampung-style roof. The station is integrated with other transportation modes, with longer sheltered bus bays of 36 m (118 ft) that can accommodate up to three buses, alongside taxi stands and parking for 20 bicycles. The bus bays serve cross-border services to Johor Bahru, Malaysia.

Designed to accommodate crowds visiting Singapore Turf Club during race events, Kranji station is the largest station on the Woodlands extension. The 1,300 m^{2} (14,000 sq ft) concourse level is three times larger than those at other stations with many fare gates to allow efficient crowd flow. The station has twice the number of escalators and stairs (four escalators and two stairs) and the direction of the escalators could be varied depending on the crowd flow. Initially without shops due to the lack of residential developments, there are now retail shops at the first level of the station as part of the SMRT Shop & Dine Concept.

A mural is on display as part of SMRT's Comic Connect, which is a public art showcase of heritage-themed murals by the train operator. Created by local artist Ronnie SC Tan, the mural depicts the Kranji War Memorial, the Sungei Boloh Wetland Reserve, the Singapore-Kranji Railway, and goats from Hay Dairies, the only goat farm in Singapore. Tan gained inspiration by going for hikes and extensively researching the area.
