= Bukit Panjang MRT/LRT station =

Mass Rapid Transit and light rail station in Singapore

Bukit Panjang DT1 – BP6 武吉班让 புக்கிட் பாஞ்சாங்
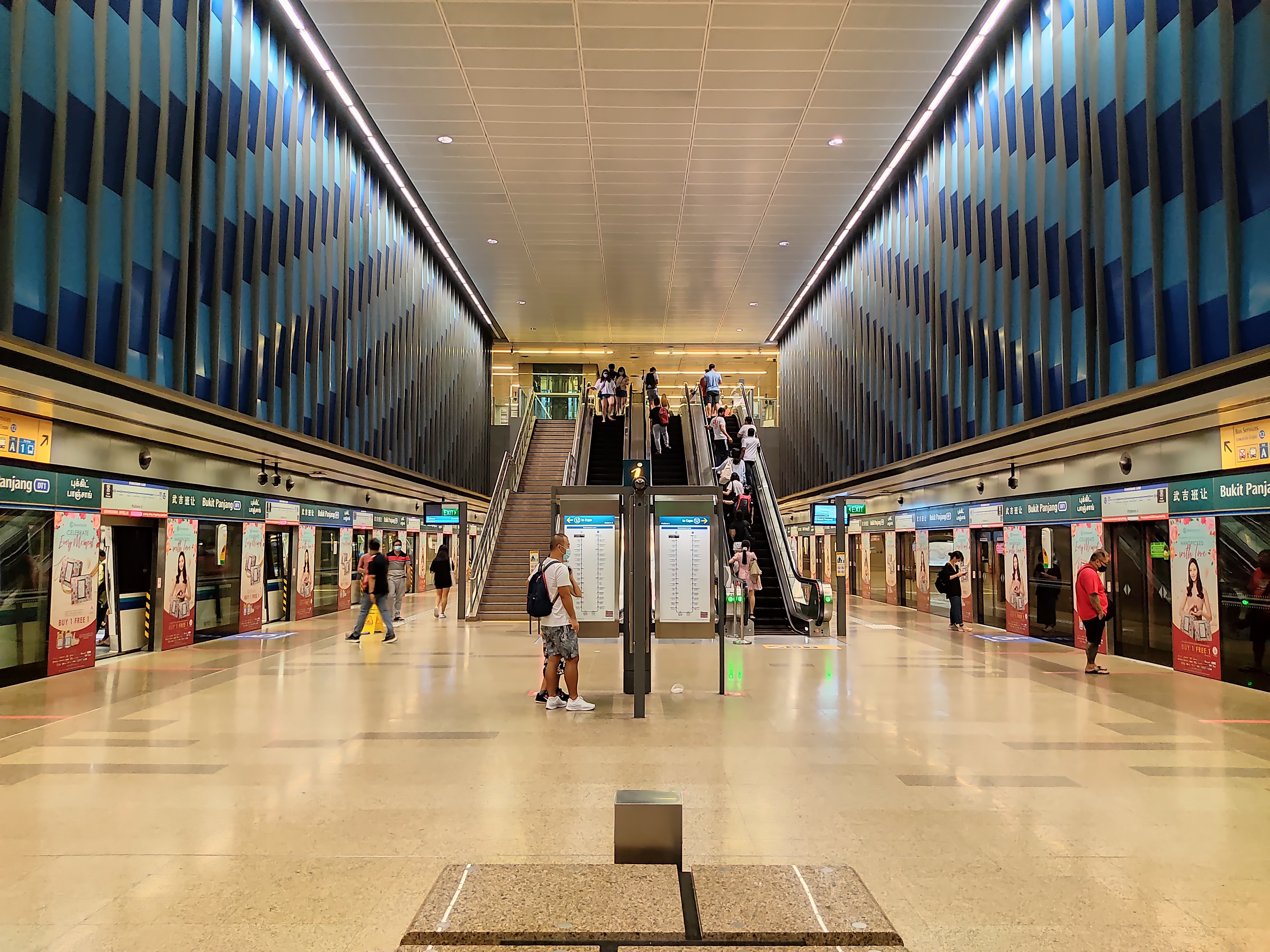
- DTL platforms of Bukit Panjang station

General information
- Location: 950 Upper Bukit Timah Road, Singapore 678213 (DTL); 11 Petir Road, Singapore 678268 (BPLRT)
- Coordinates: 01°22′43″N 103°45′42″E
- System: Mass Rapid Transit (MRT) / Light Rail Transit (LRT) interchange and terminus
- Owner: Land Transport Authority
- Operator: SBS Transit (Downtown Line); SMRT Trains (Bukit Panjang LRT)
- Line: Downtown Line Bukit Panjang LRT
- Platforms: 4 (1 island platform, 2 side platforms)
- Tracks: 4 (2 MRT, 2 LRT)
- Connections: Bukit Panjang, Taxi

Construction
- Structure type: Underground (Downtown Line); Elevated (Bukit Panjang LRT)
- Platform levels: 2
- Parking: Yes (Hillion Mall)
- Accessible: Yes

History
- Opened: 6 November 1999; 27 years ago (Bukit Panjang LRT); 27 December 2015; 10 years ago (Downtown Line)
- Former names: Petir, Tenth Mile, Zhenghua

Passengers
- June 2024: 36,263 per day

Services
Preceding station	Mass Rapid Transit	Following station
Terminus	Downtown Line	Cashew towards Expo
DE1 towards Sungei Kadut	Downtown Line Future service	Cashew towards Sungei Bedok
Preceding station	Light Rail Transit	Following station
Phoenix towards Choa Chu Kang	Bukit Panjang LRT Service A	Senja towards Choa Chu Kang
Phoenix towards Choa Chu Kang	Bukit Panjang LRT Service B	Petir towards Choa Chu Kang
Track layout
Location
- Location within Singapore Rail

Bukit Panjang MRT/LRT station (/ˈbʊkɪt ˌpɑːndʒɑːŋ/ BUUK-it PAHN-jahng) is a Mass Rapid Transit (MRT) and Light Rail Transit (LRT) interchange station on the Downtown Line (DTL) and the Bukit Panjang LRT line (BPLRT) in Singapore. Located in the namesake estate of Bukit Panjang, the station is at the junction of Upper Bukit Timah Road and Petir Road. The station serves the commercial buildings of Bukit Panjang Plaza, Hillion Mall, and Junction 10. It forms a part of the Bukit Panjang Integrated Transport Hub (BPITH), which also contains a bus interchange.

The LRT station opened on 6 November 1999 along with the other stations on the BPLRT. It later became an interchange station and the terminus of the DTL after the opening of DTL Stage 2 on 27 December 2015. Primarily serving the estate and other developments in the vicinity, the DTL station is not directly linked to the BPLRT station, with an unpaid link connecting the two stations. Nevertheless, it is recognised as a transfer within a 15-minute grace period.

== History ==
=== Bukit Panjang LRT ===
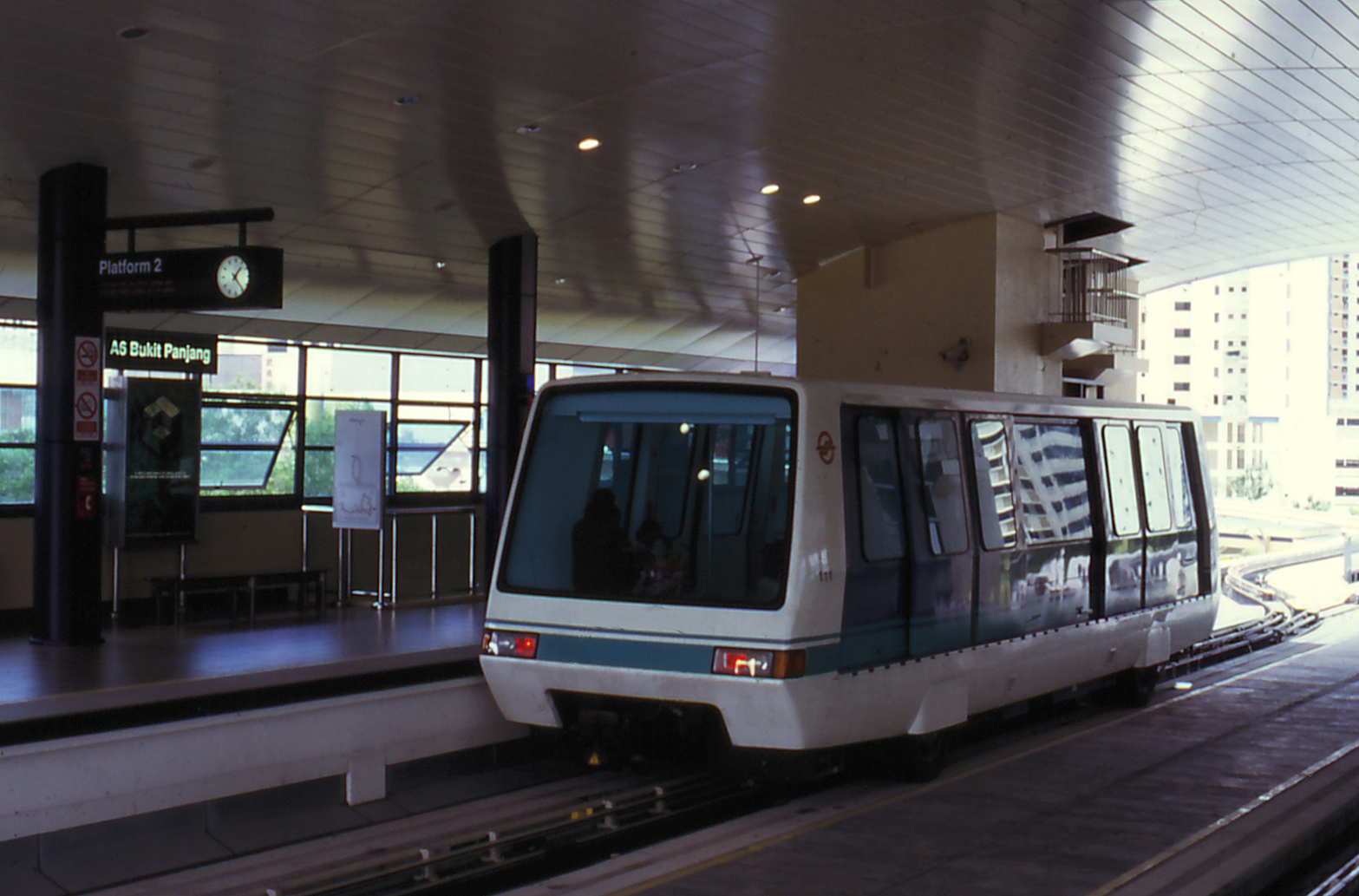
Bukit Panjang LRT station in 2000, shortly after its opening

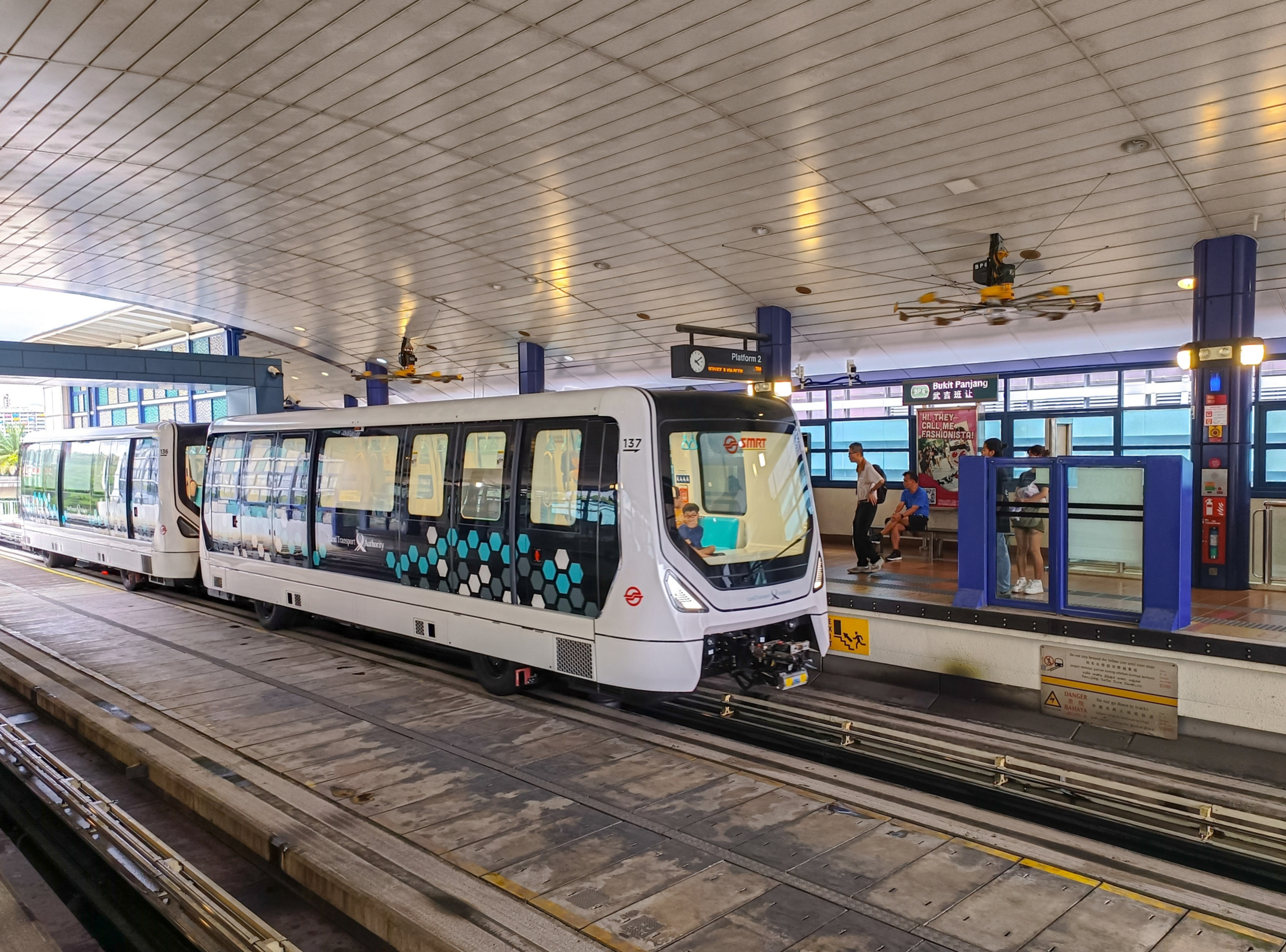
Bukit Panjang LRT station in 2024

The Bukit Panjang LRT line was first announced by Communications Minister Mah Bow Tan in December 1994 as a government pilot project that could "extend the reach and accessibility of the MRT network". In February 1996, Prime Minister Goh Chok Tong announced that construction of the Bukit Panjang LRT would proceed, and was expected to be completed in three years at a cost of S$300 million.

The contract for the design and construction of the 8-kilometre (5.0-mile) LRT line was awarded to a joint venture – Keppel Corporation, Gammon, and Adtranz – for S$285 million (US$202.12 million). The LRT station opened along with the Bukit Panjang LRT line on 6 November 1999.

An LRT train had hit a switch beam at the Bukit Panjang station at about 5:40 pm on 29 August 2001, resulting in a power failure. As a result, 10,000 peak-hour commuters were stranded at the station the next morning for repair works to the LRT service. Service resumed at 10:15 am later on that day.

In 2015, platform barriers were installed on the LRT platforms. The Bukit Panjang and Choa Chu Kang stations were given priority for their installation due to projected high commuter traffic from the Downtown MRT line. These barriers were installed to prevent people from falling or trespassing on the tracks. However, unlike the MRT platform screen doors, these barriers have openings for train alignment rather than retractable doors. New ceiling fans were installed over the LRT platforms in 2018.

=== Downtown Line ===
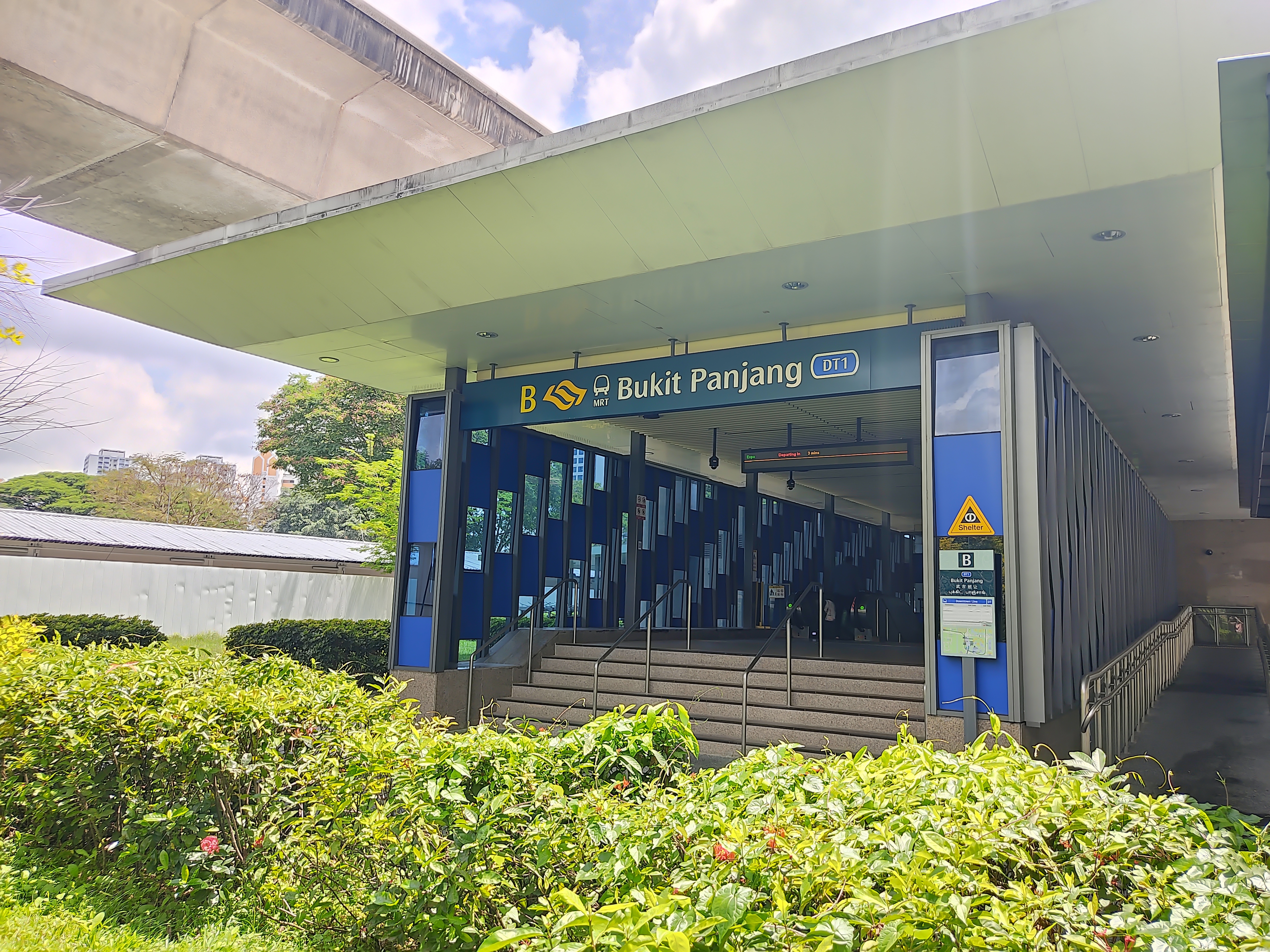
One of the entrances to the DTL station

On 15 July 2008, when the station locations were revealed for Downtown line Stage 2 (DTL2), the DTL station for the Bukit Panjang area was initially called Petir as a working name. When questioned by the public if the station could be directly linked to Bukit Panjang LRT station instead, the Land Transport Authority (LTA) replied that there were technical constraints for the line to sharply turn towards the LRT station and back to Woodlands Road. Nevertheless, plans were made for connections between Petir DTL station and the Bukit Panjang LRT station. In the end, the station was located along Upper Bukit Timah Road and was not directly connected to the BPLRT. The DTL station name was eventually finalised as Bukit Panjang on 16 June 2009.

Contract 912 for the design and construction of Petir station and its associated tunnels was awarded to Lum Chang Building Contractors Pte Ltd at approximately S$452.4 million (US$311.03 million) in June 2009. Construction was scheduled to commence in the second quarter of 2009 and targeted to complete by 2015.

Excavation works for DTL2 caused a sinkhole on Woodlands Road on 16 March 2013. The sinkhole, which was reported to be as wide as one lane, was patched up soon after. Investigations revealed that the construction works destabilised the soil, rupturing an underground water pipe. The soil movement and the rupture of the pipe caused the sinkhole to open up. No motorists or pedestrians were injured in the incident. On 9 April 2014, a fire broke out at a construction site for the Downtown line in the early morning. No injuries were reported and the fire was put out in 30 minutes. Originally expected to open in 2016, the station opened on 27 December 2015 along with the other DTL Stage 2 stations, a few months ahead of schedule.

Exit C began construction in 2014, significantly later than the rest of the station as only two entrances to the station were initially planned. A successful campaign by residents living in the Senja area to their local Members of Parliament (MPs) led to the approval of an additional exit by LTA. Originally slated to open in December 2016, it opened later on 9 February 2018, connecting the station to Bukit Panjang Road. The construction of the entrance faced challenges such as the presence of high rock levels during excavation and multiple utilities crossing over the construction shaft of the new entrance. More time was needed for manual mining works for the entrance, to prevent damage to vital utilities which cannot be diverted.

==== Extension to Sungei Kadut ====
An additional extension of the DTL to Sungei Kadut station from Bukit Panjang station was announced on 25 May 2019 by the LTA. The extension is expected to be completed by 2035 with an additional unnamed intermediate station coded as DE1.

== Station details ==
=== Services ===
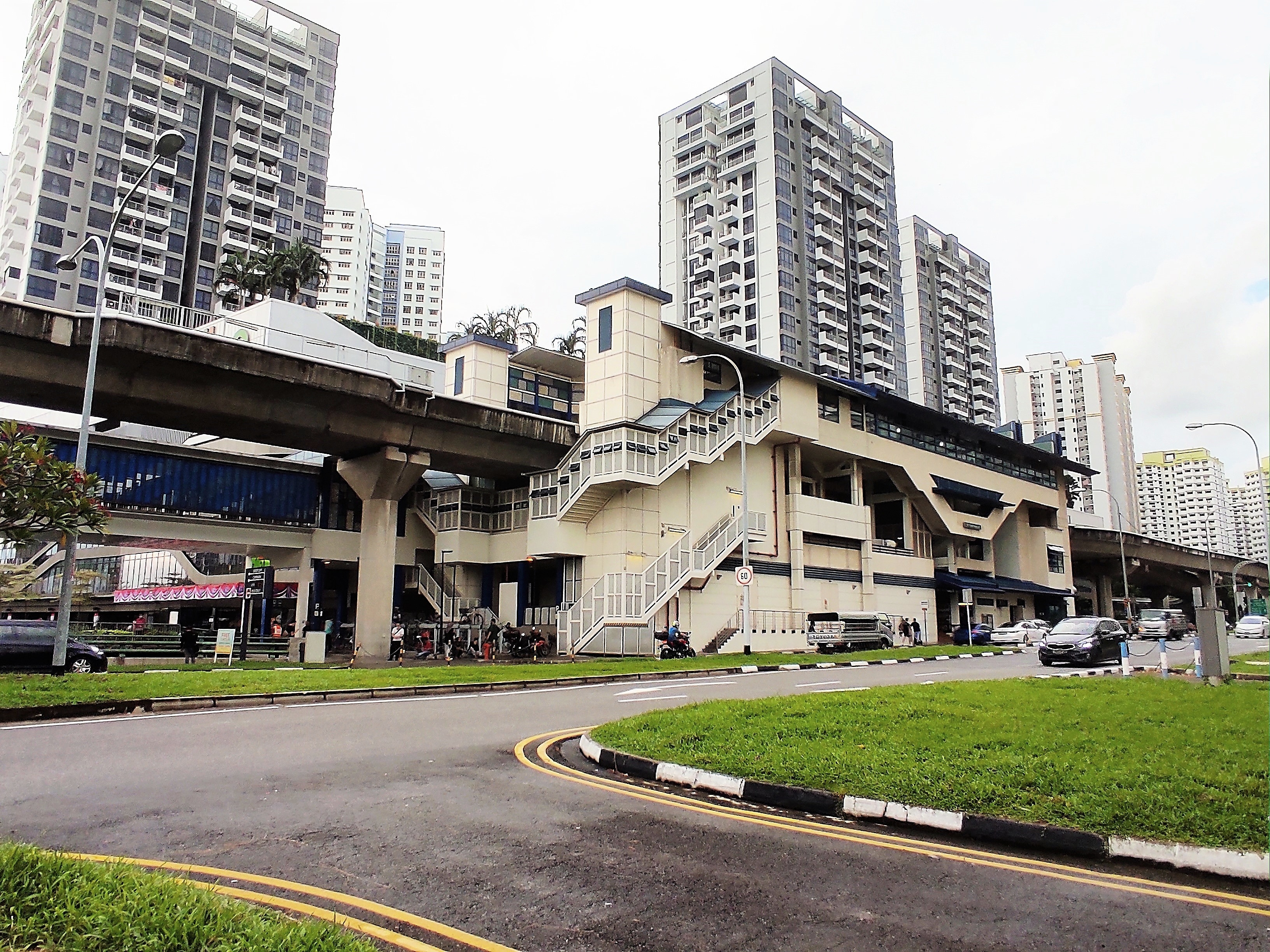
The exterior of the LRT station

The station is an interchange between the DTL and BPLRT. The station code is BP6/DT1, as reflected on official maps. On the BPLRT, the LRT station is after Phoenix station. Services on the BPLRT then loop around the Bukit Panjang estate, via Petir station (Service B) or Senja station (Service A) after this station. There were services to Ten Mile Junction station until it closed on 13 January 2019 via Service C which operated with reduced frequency due to low ridership. Train frequencies on the BPLRT range between 2.5 and 5 minutes.

On the DTL, the station is currently the line's terminus. The DTL station is not directly connected to the BPLRT station and hence commuters have to exit either of the stations to transfer to another line via a link bridge at the LRT station's mezzanine level. The transfer is considered a "valid transfer" of a "journey" as long as it does not exceed 15 minutes. Train frequencies on the DTL range between 2 and 5 minutes.

=== Station design ===
The LRT station has the conventional barrel-roof design seen on other BPLRT stations. The design was chosen by the Bukit Panjang residents during the construction of the BPLRT.

The DTL station, designed by local architectural firm SAA Architects, has three levels. Like all stations on the DTL, the station has barrier-free access for the disabled, with features such as lifts, wheelchair-accessible toilets, wider faregates and tactile flooring for the visually-impaired. The station entrances are shaped like pavilions along a park connector. The entrances' design is intended to mimic passenger flow with vertical screens interspersed with streaks of blue, giving the appearance of rippling waves. Such patterns are also adopted for the vent shafts which blends into the landscape. In addition, the patterns provide a distinguishing marker for the station.

=== Public artwork ===
An artwork Punctum of the Long Hills by John Clang is displayed at the DTL platforms of the station as part of the network's Art-in-Transit Programme. The artwork showcases a row of tall Housing Development Board (HDB) flats, subtly reflecting the long hilly landscape for which Bukit Panjang is named after. The two giant-sized boys peeking around public housing blocks in the artwork signifies a sense of curiosity and the spirit of adventure.
