= Gali Batu Depot =

MRT and bus depot in Singapore

Gali Batu Depot 卡利巴株车厂
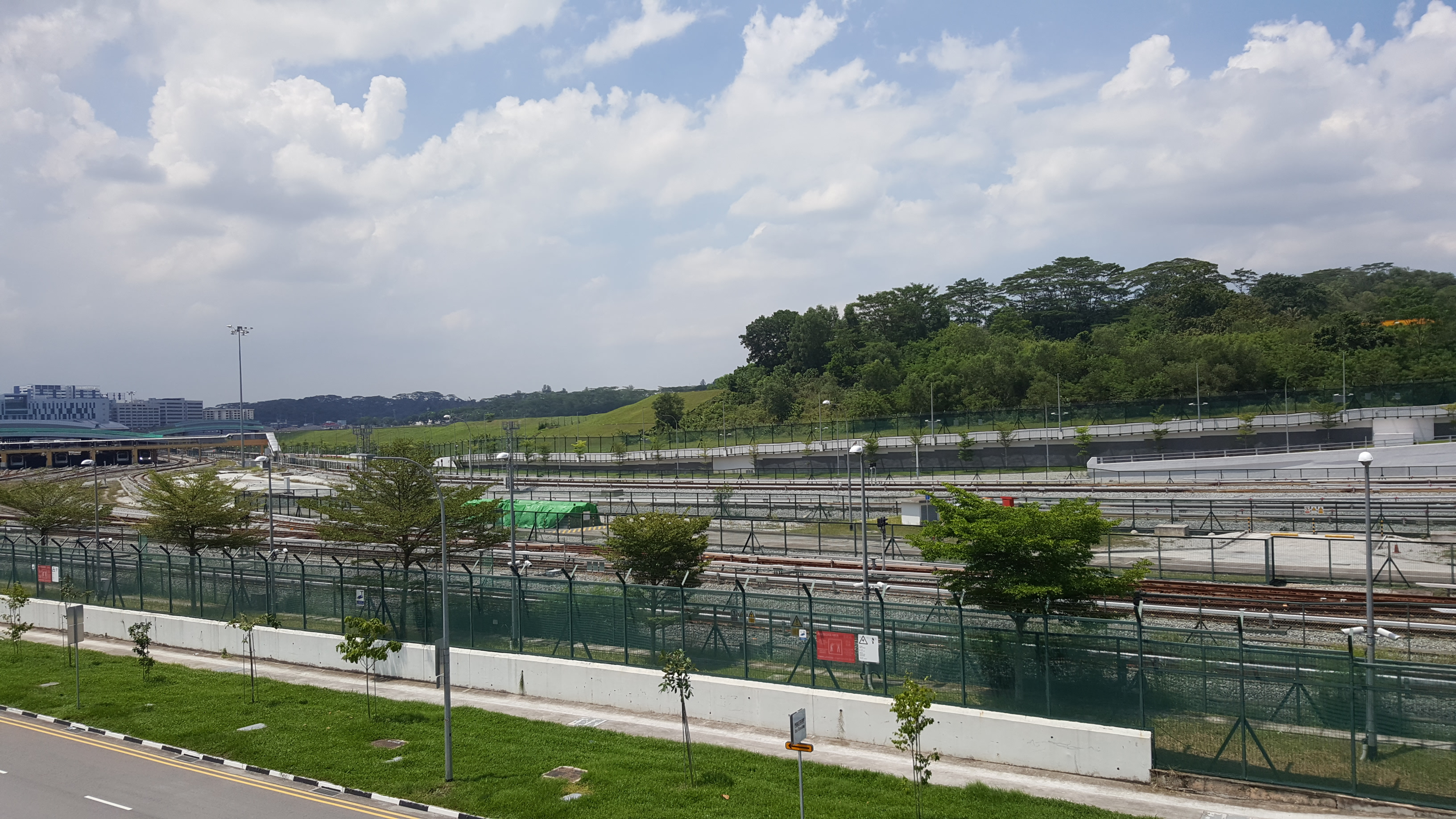
- Gali Batu Depot
- Interactive map of Gali Batu Depot 卡利巴株车厂

Location
- Location: 350 Woodlands Road, Singapore 677730 (Train); 5 Jalan Gali Batu, Singapore 679530 (Bus)
- Coordinates: 1°23′52.57″N 103°45′21.47″E

Characteristics
- Owner: Land Transport Authority
- Operator: SBS Transit DTL Pte Ltd (ComfortDelGro Corporation) (Train); SMRT Buses Ltd (SMRT Corporation) (Bus)
- Depot code: GBD
- Type: At-grade
- Roads: Woodlands Road
- Rolling stock: Bombardier Movia C951
- Routes served: Downtown Line

History
- Opened: 27 December 2015; 10 years ago (Train); 4 October 2025; 13 months ago (Bus)

Gali Batu Depot is a train and bus depot located off Woodlands Road in Singapore. It provides maintenance services for the Downtown Line (DTL) of the Mass Rapid Transit (MRT) system, with the capacity to stable up to 42 trains. The bus depot has the capacity to stable up to 715 buses.

== History ==
=== Train depot ===
In early 2009, as works for the DTL's trains were underway, the Land Transport Authority (LTA) shifted its attention to Gali Batu Depot, which would store said trains. By March, the LTA had selected two companies to work on the depot; GS Engineering and Construction Corp and Hock Lian Seng.

Prior to construction, nearly 2,000 graves from the Kwong Hou Sua Cemetery had to be exhumed due to the depot's proximity. Exhumation was expected to start in March and finish by June. Construction of the depot began in late 2009. During construction, 3,900,000 cubic metres (140,000,000 cu ft) of dirt was dug out. By February 2015, The Straits Times reported that the depot was in its final stage and was to be passed to its operator by the end of the year. Although Stage 1 of the DTL was opened in December 2013, operations of the line were being conducted from Kim Chuan Depot as Gali Batu was not ready yet; it would only be ready around October 2015. The transfer of operations from Kim Chuan to Gali Batu was conducted within three hours to avoid disrupting operations in the DTL, with migration tests conducted on three nights every week for six months prior to the transfer. In December 2015, the depot started operations along with stations in Stage 2 of the DTL. Prior to the opening, several religious leaders from the Inter-Religious Organisation (IRO) jointly blessed the depot.

In February 2015, the LTA announced that the capacity of the depot would be expanded to stable 81 trains by 2019. A S$137.4 million (2015) (US$99.94 million) contract was handed out in January 2015, with an expectation that it would be completed by November 2019. In October 2019, it was announced that signalling simulation centres would be installed in Gali Batu by Siemens after Thales set up a similar facility in Bishan Depot, which stemmed from the Joo Koon rail accident. It was installed progressively from the end of 2019 to the expected completion date at the end of 2020.

=== Bus depot ===
Plans for a bus depot adjacent to the Gali Batu train depot were first unveiled in August 2017, through an amendment of the 2014 masterplan by the Urban Redevelopment Authority (URA). Construction of the bus depot began in late 2019 and was initially scheduled to be completed by 2023. In 2021, construction came to a pause when Greatearth, the contractor, entered liquidation. By then, the opening had been delayed to 2024.

The bus depot officially opened on 4 October 2025, replacing Kranji Bus Depot. By June 2026, the depot was housing and servicing 217 buses.

== Details ==
Gali Batu Depot is located off Bukit Panjang station on the Downtown Line and has 2 reception tracks: 2 tracks Expo-bound towards Bukit Panjang station.

== Bibliography ==
- Feng, Zengkun (2017). Downtown Line: Soaring to new heights (PDF). Singapore: Straits Times Press Pte Ltd. ISBN 978-981-4747-66-0. OCLC 1003852882.
