= Museum (planning area) =

- Planning Area

Other transcription(s)
  - Chinese: 博物馆 (Simplified) 博物館 (Traditional); Bówùguǎn (Pinyin); Phok-bu̍t-koán (Hokkien POJ)
  - Malay: Muzium (Rumi) موزيوم (Jawi)
  - Tamil: அருங்காட்சியகம் Aruṅkāṭciyakam (Transliteration)
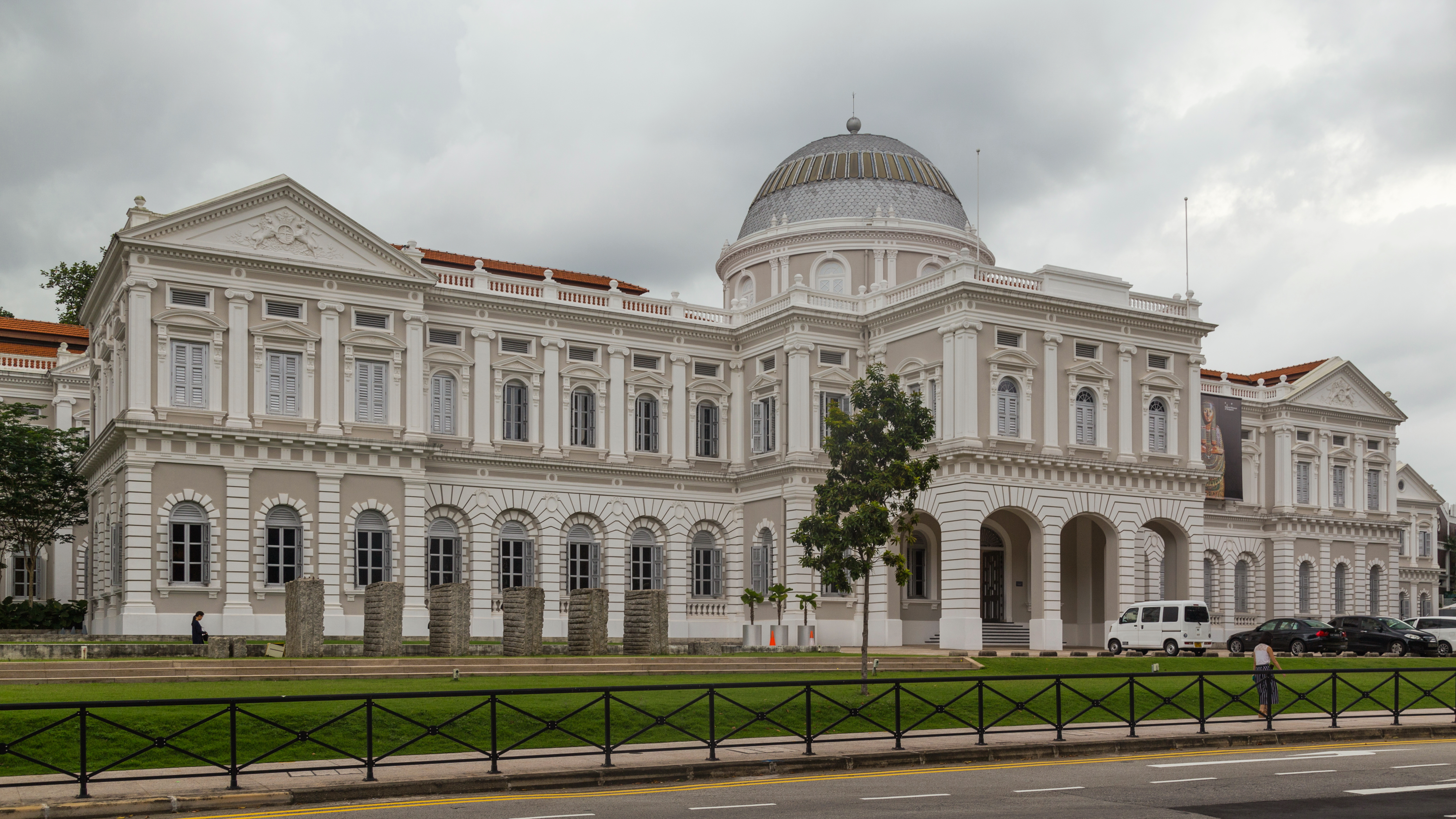
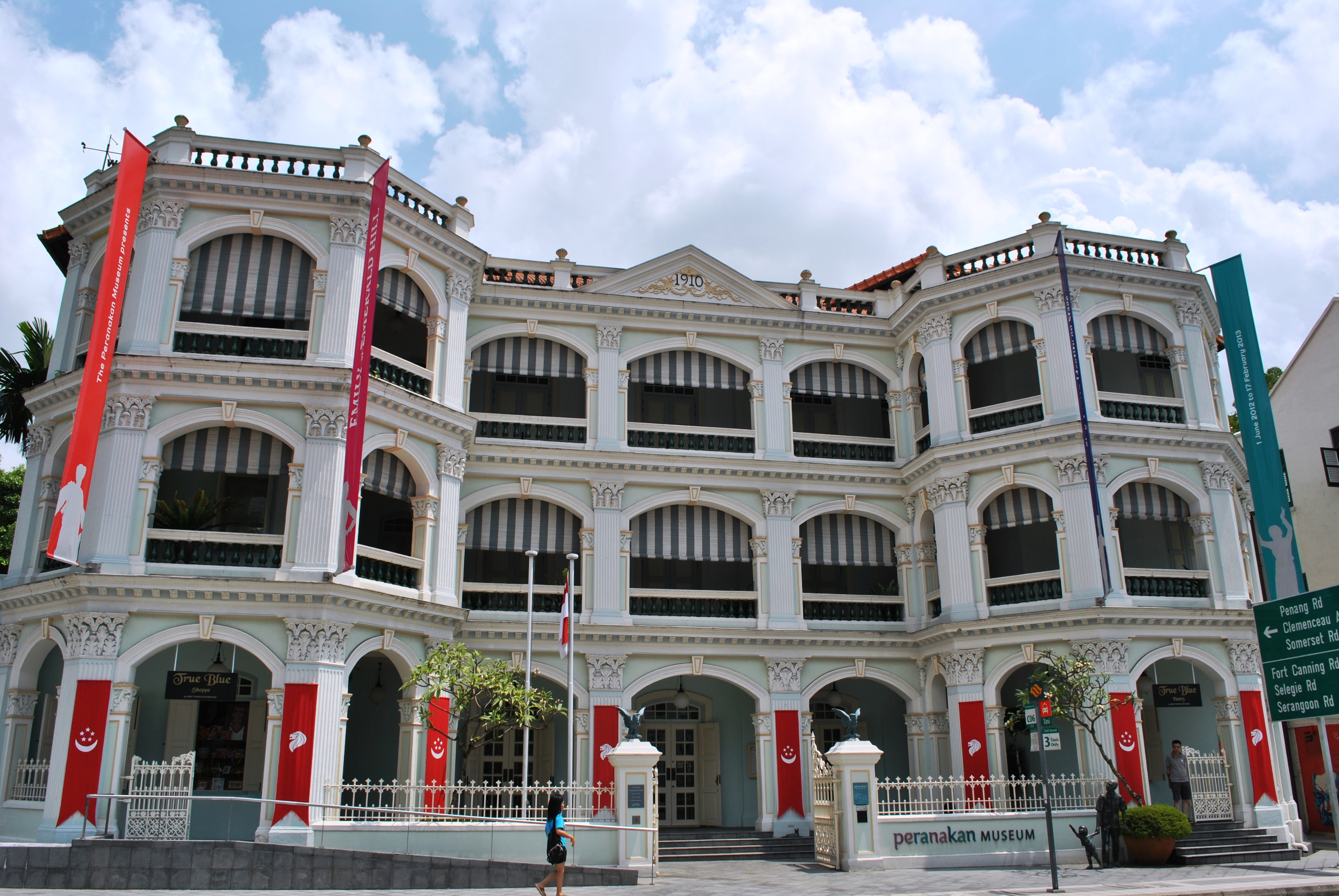
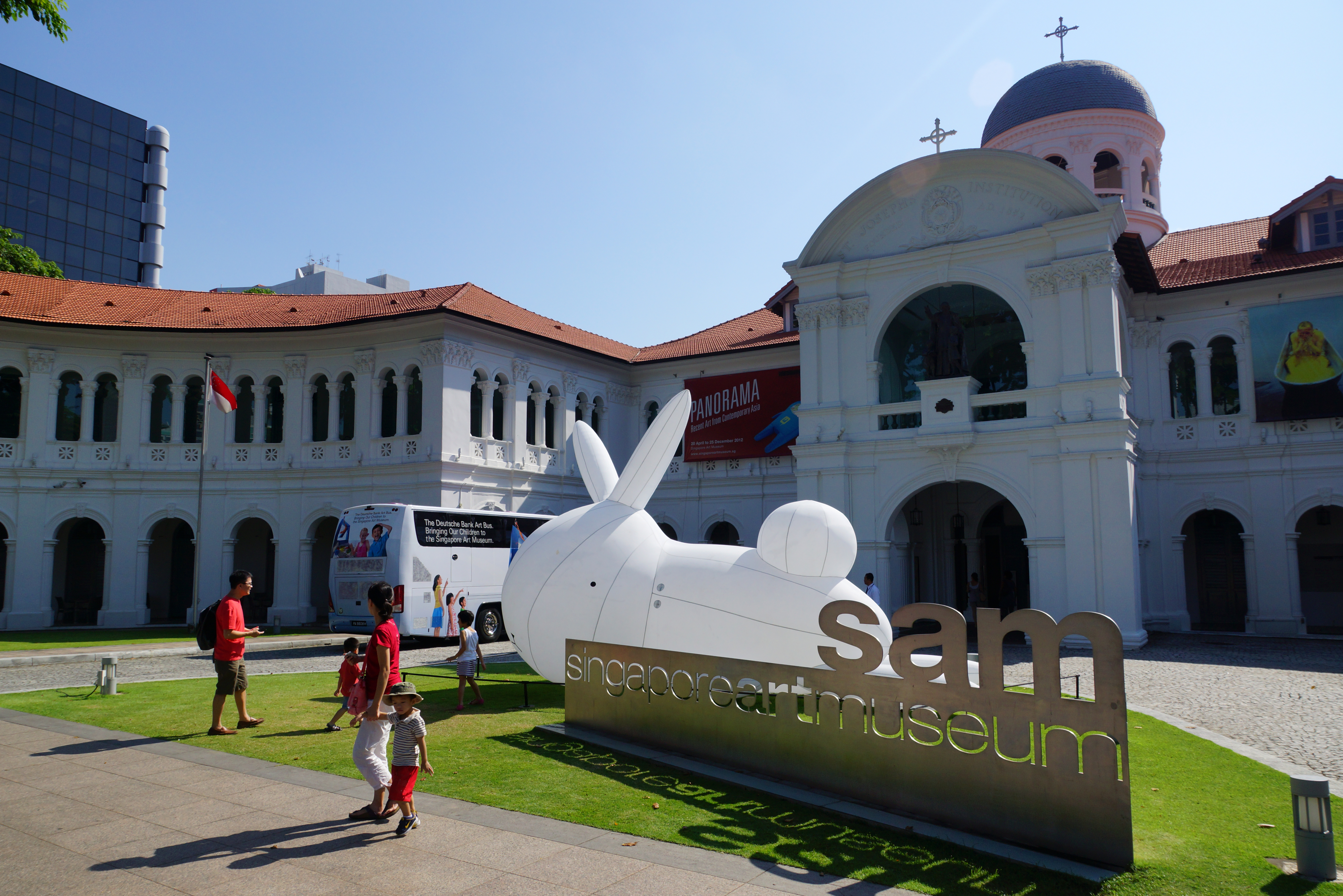
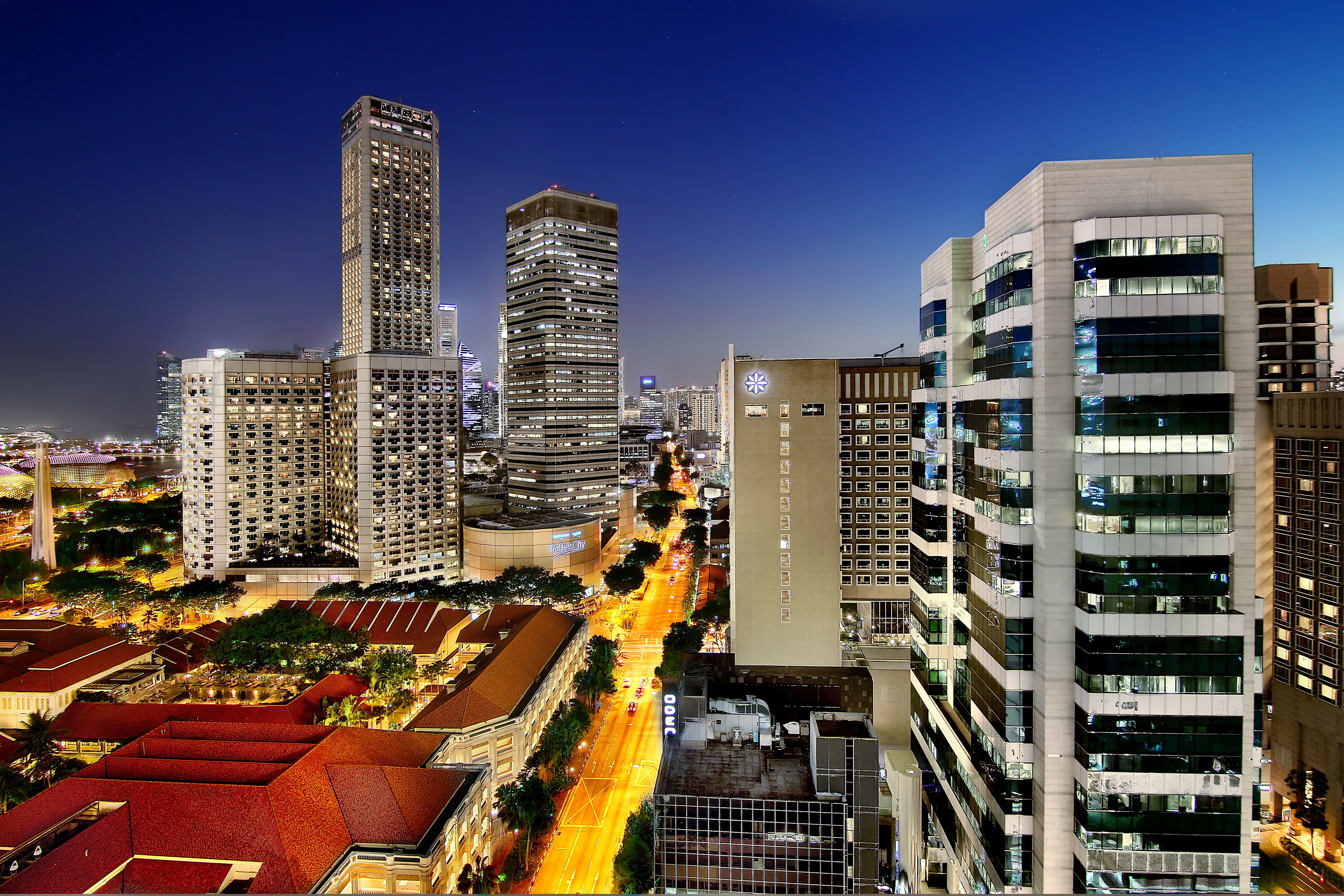
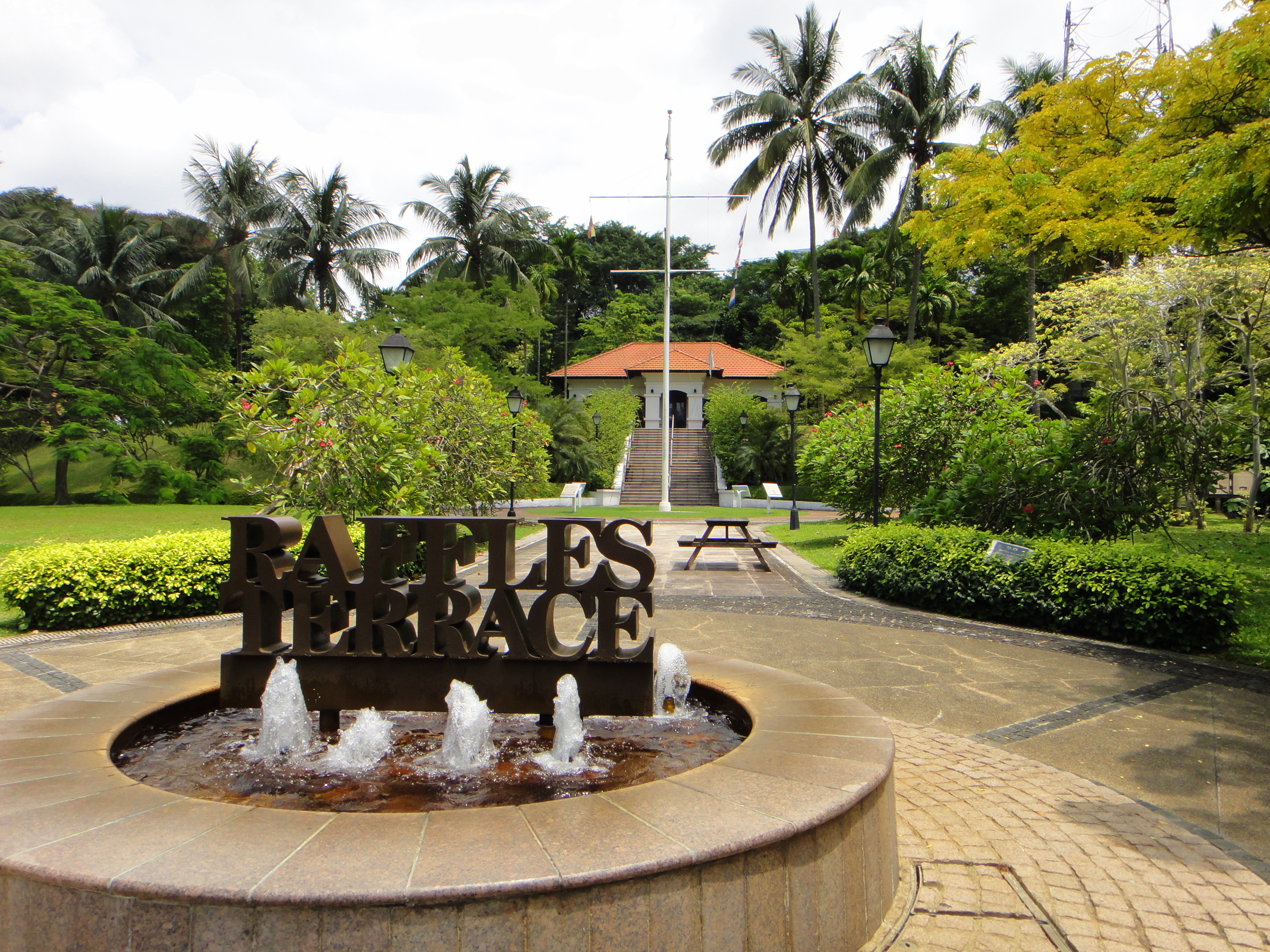
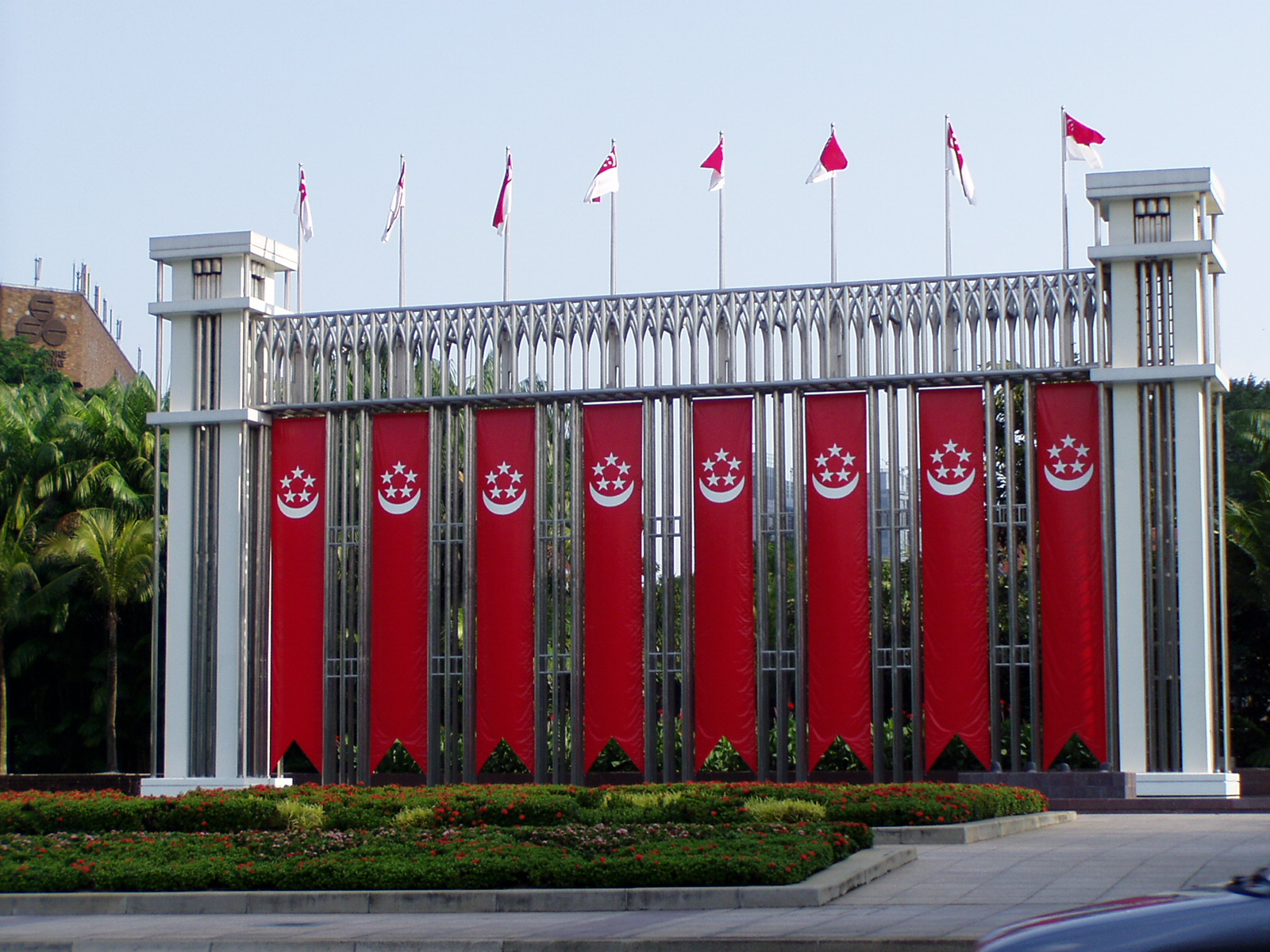
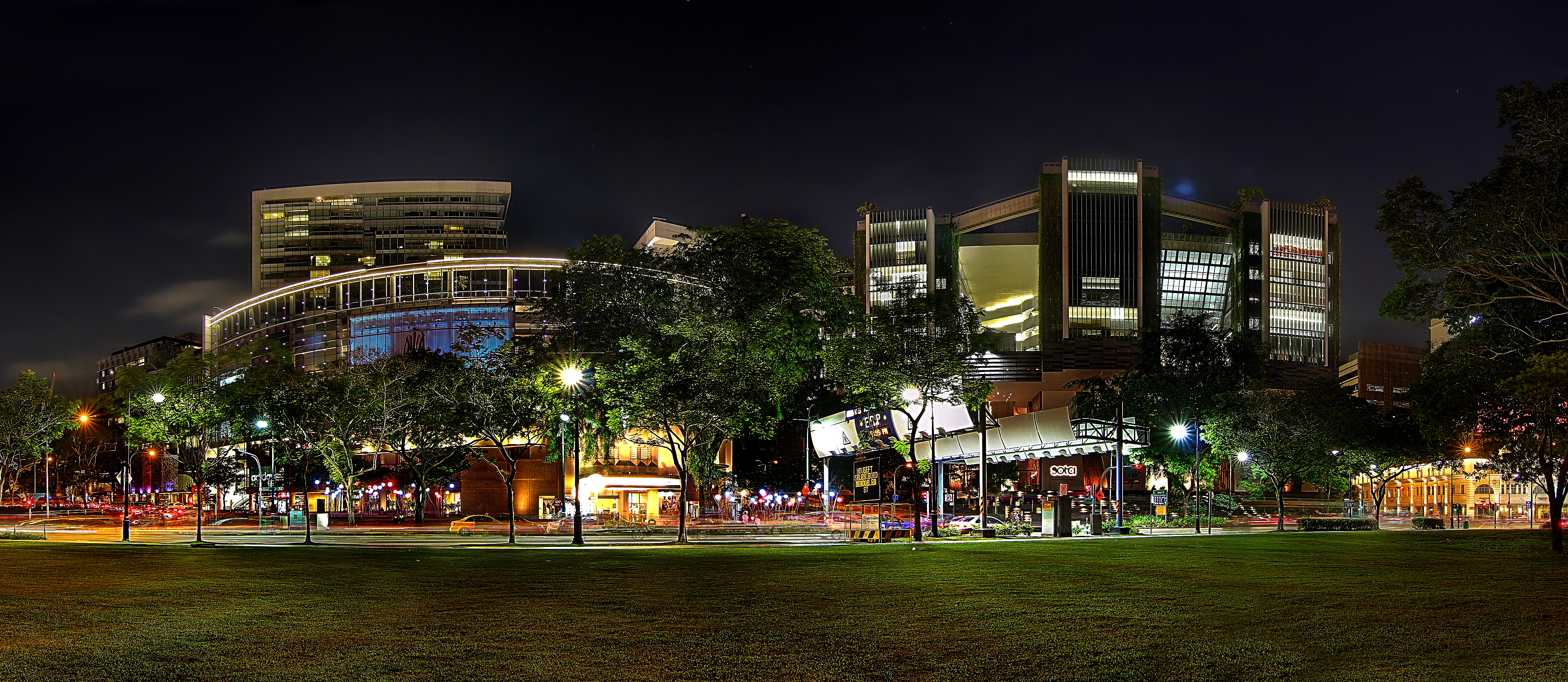
- From top left to right: National Museum of Singapore, Peranakan Museum, Singapore Art Museum, Aerial view of Bras Basah, Raffles Terrace in Fort Canning Park, Istana Park, The Luxe, The Cathay and SOTA at night

- Location in Central Region

- Location of Museum within Singapore
- Coordinates: 1°17′47.8″N 103°50′54.6″E
- Country: Singapore
- Region: Central Region
- CDC: Central Singapore CDC
- Town council: Tanjong Pagar Town Council
- Constituency: Tanjong Pagar GRC
- DGP exhibited: 1994
- PA incorporated: 22 January 1999

Government
  - Mayor: Central Singapore CDC: Denise Phua
  - Members of Parliament: Tanjong Pagar GRC: Alvin Tan; Jalan Besar GRC: Denise Phua

Area
  - Total: 0.83 km^{2} (0.32 sq mi)
  - Rank: 55th

Population (2026)
  - Total: 860
  - Rank: 39th
  - Density: 1,000/km^{2} (2,700/sq mi)
  - Rank: 36th
- Demonym: Official: Museum resident
- Postal district: 09

Museum is a planning area located in the Central Area of the Central Region of Singapore. The area plays a "bridging role" between the Orchard area and the Downtown Core, which necessitates proper transport networks for vehicles, pedestrians and public transport. Due to the sheer size of green areas in the district, the Urban Redevelopment Authority (URA) has designated it a 'green lung' in the Central Area. However, Museum is also home to cultural and commercial activities. Around 65% of the area is available for future development, making it a hotbed for new infrastructure and buildings.

Museum planning area is bounded by the planning areas of Newton and Rochor to the north, the Downtown Core to the southeast, Singapore River to the south, River Valley to the west and Orchard to the northwest. It is divided itself into three subzones, Bras Basah, Dhoby Ghaut and Fort Canning, home to Fort Canning Hill.

== History ==
Ten national monuments are located within the Museum Planning Area, namely the Armenian Church, the Cathedral of the Good Shepherd, Cathay Building (now The Cathay), the Central Fire Station, the House of Tan Yeok Nee, the MacDonald House, the Old Tao Nan School (Peranakan Museum), the National Museum of Singapore, the Old Hill Street Police Station and the Singapore Art Museum/Former Saint Joseph's Institution. The area is home to significant events such as the Battle of Singapore and MacDonald House bombing.

Other historical sites include:

- YMCA Building
- National Theatre
- United Chinese Library

== Geography ==
The Museum Planning Area is bordered by Rochor to the northeast, the Downtown Core to the southeast, the Singapore River Area to the southwest, River Valley to the west and Newton and Orchard to the northwest. The area is roughly bounded by Hill Street, River Valley Road, Clemenceau Avenue and Bras Basah Road. It is the smallest urban planning area, with an area of 83 hectares.

Parks and open spaces take up a third of the area of the Museum Planning Area, and include Fort Canning, Istana Park and Bras Basah Park, which can be used for recreational purposes. Collectively, these places will form the so-called 'green lung' of the Central Area. Terraces have been proposed to allow for "a more prominent and convenient access" to the Fort Canning area.

== Institutions ==
The Museum Planning Area is Singapore's "institutional hub", with 11% of land set aside for institutional use and reserve sites to be safeguarded for future institutions. The Registry of Marriages and the sprawling Singapore Management University campus are located in the area.

The many museums in the area, which give the Museum District its name, include the Singapore Art Museum, the National Archives of Singapore, the Children's Museum (formerly the Singapore Philatelic Museum), the Peranakan Museum, the Civil Defence Heritage Gallery (at the site of the Central Fire Station), National Heritage Gallery and the Armenian Heritage Gallery are all here. The National Library, the flagship library of the National Library Board, is also located here. The National Gallery, National Museum of Singapore and the Asian Civilisations Museum are in the neighbouring City Hall, Downtown Core planning area.

The arts scene is vibrant in the area, with The Substation, the Singapore Calligraphy Centre, the YMS Arts Centre and the Singapore Dance Ensemble all located within its boundaries. All the major arts schools in Singapore are also located in Bras Basah: the first pre-tertiary arts school, School of the Arts (SOTA), and also the two institutions that form the University of the Arts: LASALLE College of the Arts and Nanyang Academy of Fine Arts (NAFA). Two buildings here, both designed by local firm WOHA, have also been awarded at the World Architecture Festival: SOTA, in 2010 in the learning category, and Bras Basah MRT station, a Mass Rapid Transit (MRT) station on the Circle line (CCL), in 2009 in the transport category.

Scattered within the area and in neighbouring areas are places of worship such as churches, mosques, Hindu temples and synagogues. Like Telok Ayer Street, it also features them in close proximity to each other: along Waterloo Street and its preluding path there stand the Buddhist Kwan Im Thong Hood Cho Temple, the Hindu Sri Krishnan Temple, the Jewish Maghain Aboth synagogue and the Catholic Church of Saints Peter & Paul. The oldest surviving church in Singapore, the Armenian Church of St. Gregory the Illuminator (est. 1835) and the Bible House are present in the Museum planning area. The second-oldest surviving church, St. Andrew's Cathedral (est. 1836), is in the neighbouring City Hall, Downtown Core planning area.

== Residential development ==
Despite its prime location, residential projects were only allocated 1% of the land area, and the Museum Planning Area was criticised for lacking residential zoning. Due to the lack of residents, there were fears that the area would become a "ghost town" at night. Furthermore, the concept of living within the Central Area had gained popularity, and up-market skyscraper condominiums could be built. The greenery of the Museum Planning Area could provide a peaceful environment for living.

The URA replied that several plots of land had been sold for residential-commercial mixed use, and that more housing developments were to be planned and constructed. The URA emphasised the importance of the area as a transition between the central business district and shopping areas, as well as the green, pedestrian-friendly nature of the URA's plan for the area.

== Commercial development ==
The Museum Planning Area is home to various shopping malls, including Park Mall, Plaza Singapura, The Cathay, Singapore Shopping Centre and The Atrium @ Orchard. More vacant land will be set aside for commercial uses, especially around Dhoby Ghaut MRT station and Bras Basah MRT station. These will be properly integrated and connected with the respective stations.

Hotels in the area include Bayview Hotel Singapore and Hotel Rendezvous. Furthermore, a hotel development at the foot of Fort Canning Hill near the junction of Clemenceau Avenue and River Valley Road is in the planning stages, and is meant to be a retreat from urban living "amidst lush greenery". Other developments are planned on reserved sites near Fort Canning, but details have not been released.

== Transport ==
Bras Basah MRT station

The Museum Planning Area is served by four Mass Rapid Transit (MRT) stations: Dhoby Ghaut, Bras Basah, Fort Canning and Bencoolen. The North–South Line and the North East Line can only be accessible from Dhoby Ghaut while the Circle Line can be accessible from both Dhoby Ghaut and Bras Basah, while the Downtown Line is accessible from Fort Canning and Bencoolen. The Central Expressway's Chin Swee Tunnel also passes under the area.

=== Roads ===
==== Improvements ====
Several changes to the road network in the area will be implemented, including the construction of Fort Canning Tunnel and the realignment of Stamford Road and Handy Road. The rationale for the improvements is increased traffic from Marina Centre and relieving the traffic congestion along Orchard Road. Furthermore, a new road network has been put in place to ensure smooth traffic flow after the full development of land around the MRT Stations.

==== Major roads ====
- Armenian Street
- Bras Basah Road
- Central Expressway
- Clemenceau Avenue
- Fort Canning Tunnel
- Hill Street
- Orchard Road
- Queen Street
- River Valley Road
- Stamford Road
- Victoria Street

=== Pedestrian linkages ===
The Development Guide Plan for the Museum Planning Area envisages "a comprehensive pedestrian network linking developments, parks and open spaces". New promenades and pedestrian malls are planned for the area to enhance and connect existing sidewalks. A web of underpasses and covered walkways will link Orchard, the Singapore River, Raffles City and Marina Centre.
