= Registry of Marriages =

Singaporean government agency

- Pejabat Pendaftaran Perkahwinan (Malay) 婚姻注册局 (Chinese) திருமணப் பதிவகம் (Tamil)
- Entrance of the Registry of Marriages in 2006

Agency overview
- Formed: 15 September 1961; 65 years ago
- Jurisdiction: Government of Singapore
- Headquarters: 7 Canning Rise, Singapore 179869; 1.2943°N 103.8473°E
- Agency executive: Timothy Pak, Registrar
- Parent agency: Ministry of Social and Family Development
- Website: www.marriage.gov.sg
- Agency ID: T08GA0010F

The Registry of Marriages (ROM; Malay: Pejabat Pendaftaran Perkahwinan, Chinese: 婚姻注册局, Tamil: திருமணப் பதிவகம்) is a government department in Singapore that registers, solemnises, and keeps the official records of all civil marriages between couples married in Singapore. The ROM shares its premises with the separate Registry of Muslim Marriages (ROMM), which registers marriages between Muslims solemnised under the Administration of Muslim Law Act (AMLA).

== Functions ==
The ROM, alongside the ROMM, is a department of the Ministry of Social and Family Development. The department's primary role is to register and solemnise civil marriages under the Women's Charter. Each marriage is entered in the State Marriage Register, and couples receive the official digital certificate online. This certificate may be printed out as a keepsake. The ROM also offers online services, including searches of marriage records and applications for duplicate marriage certificates.

Couples in which at least one party is a foreigner must submit additional documents while registering for marriage at the ROM, and a separate process applies if either party is under 21 years of age. The ROM also publishes the prohibited degrees of relationship by consanguinity and affinity, within which a marriage cannot be registered.

On average, about 58 marriages are solemnised at the ROM on a typical weekday, and about 91 on a Saturday. The registry's single day record of 1,082 weddings was set on 14 February 1995, when Valentine's Day coincided with Chap Goh Mei, the 15th day of Chinese New Year, which is sometimes called Chinese Valentine's Day. Couples also favour palindromic dates, and dates whose numbers are considered auspicious under the Chinese calendar.

== History ==
=== Establishment ===
Before the Women's Charter, marriages in Singapore were governed by several different laws. Muslim marriages fell under the Muslim Marriage Ordinance No. 25 of 1957, which grew out of the Mahomedan Marriage Ordinance No. 5 of 1880. Christian marriages were covered by the Christian Marriage Ordinance No. 10 of 1940, which descended from Ordinance No. 3 of 1880. Civil marriages were covered by the Civil Marriage Ordinance No. 9 of 1940. However, registration was not compulsory for all marriages.

During the 1950s, there were growing public calls for greater protection of women, wider participation of women in public life, and the introduction of a law requiring monogamous marriage. Consequently, the ROM was established on 15 September 1961, when the Women's Charter came into force, to administer the solemnisation and registration of civil marriages. The Charter also abolished polygyny for non-Muslims. From 1961 to 1983, the ROM operated from a bungalow on Fort Canning, on a site facing the current UBS building (former Park Mall) that is now vacant.

On 6 August 1983, the ROM and ROMM moved into a new building at 7 Canning Rise, which was officially opened by Dr Ahmad Mattar, then Acting Minister for Social Affairs. The two storey building, with its distinctive pitched roof, sits at the foot of Fort Canning, near the National Museum, the Central Fire Station, and the Armenian Church.

The building was first renovated from 2000 to 2001. During the works, couples were married in temporary cubicles, though some chose to hold their ceremony by a lotus pond further uphill on Fort Canning instead. On 18 May 2001, Abdullah Tarmugi, then Minister for Community Development and Sports, officially reopened the building and launched the ROM's first logo. The building underwent a second renovation from 2010 to 2011, during which the ROM operated temporarily from the Ministry of National Development Building on Maxwell Road. It moved out on 26 January 2010, and returned to Canning Rise on 14 June 2011.

=== Since 2020s ===
On 14 April 2025, the ROM and ROMM moved to an interim site on Level 3 of the Esplanade Mall, in part of the space formerly occupied by library@esplanade, to allow the Canning Rise site to be redeveloped. For greater convenience for couples and families, the interim site also began offering Saturday solemnisations for civil marriages from 17 May 2025.

The redevelopment, expected to cost S$31.9 million, will retain the building's iconic pitched roof facade while enlarging its floor area by 60 per cent through a two storey rear extension. The new building will also include indoor solemnisation rooms facing a garden, and a rooftop garden terrace for outdoor ceremonies. Works are expected to be completed by 2029.

== See also ==
- Matrimonial law of Singapore
