= Fort Canning MRT station =

Mass Rapid Transit station in Singapore

Fort Canning DT20 福康宁 ஃபோர்ட் கெனிங்
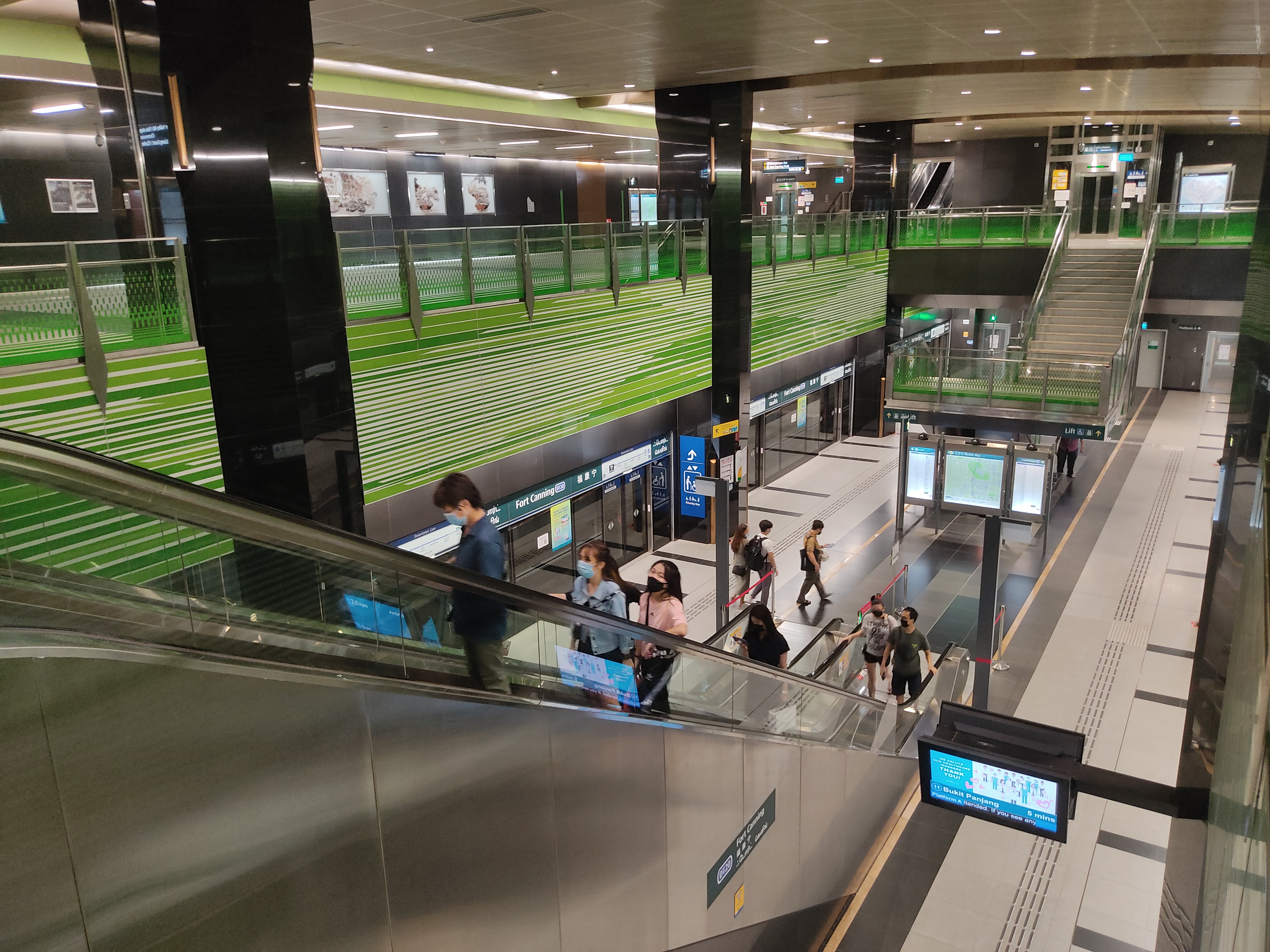
- Platform level of Fort Canning station

General information
- Location: 170 River Valley Road, Singapore 179038
- Coordinates: 1°17′33″N 103°50′40″E
- System: Mass Rapid Transit (MRT) station
- Owner: Land Transport Authority
- Operator: SBS Transit
- Line: Downtown Line
- Platforms: 2 (1 island platform)
- Tracks: 4 (including a track siding for each platform)
- Connections: Bus, taxi

Construction
- Structure type: Underground
- Platform levels: 1
- Accessible: Yes

History
- Opened: 21 October 2017; 9 years ago
- Former names: River Valley

Passengers
- June 2024: 5546 per day

Services
Preceding station	Mass Rapid Transit	Following station
Chinatown towards Bukit Panjang	Downtown Line	Bencoolen towards Expo
Track layout
Location
- Location within Singapore Rail central area

Fort Canning MRT station is an underground Mass Rapid Transit (MRT) station on the Downtown Line (DTL), located on the boundary of Museum and Singapore River planning areas, Singapore. Situated on the northern bank of the Singapore River, the station is at the foot of Fort Canning, which the station is named after. The station serves various developments including UE Square and Clarke Quay, as well as Fort Canning Park.

First announced as River Valley MRT station in August 2010, constructing the connecting tunnels to the station was one of the most complex projects on the DTL. It involved the diversion of the Singapore River, while the tunnels to the adjacent Bencoolen station had to be constructed near existing operational tunnels. Starting operations on 21 October 2017 along with the DTL Stage 3 stations, the station is designed to reflect the locality. An artwork Through His Eyes is featured as part of the Art-in-Transit programme.

== History ==
The station was first announced as River Valley station on 20 August 2010 when the Land Transport Authority (LTA) announced the 16 stations of the 21-kilometre (13-mile) Downtown Line Stage 3 (DTL 3) which spans between this station and Expo station. The line was expected to be completed in 2017. Contract 937 for the design and construction of River Valley MRT Station and associated tunnels was awarded to GS Engineering & Construction Corp. for S$255.05 million (US$190.34 million) in July 2011. Construction of these stations and tunnels started that month and completed on schedule in 2017.

On 31 May 2017, the LTA announced that the station, together with the rest of DTL 3, will be opened on 21 October that year. Passengers were offered a preview of the station along with the other DTL 3 stations at the DTL 3 Open House on 15 October.

=== Construction of tunnels between Chinatown and Fort Canning ===
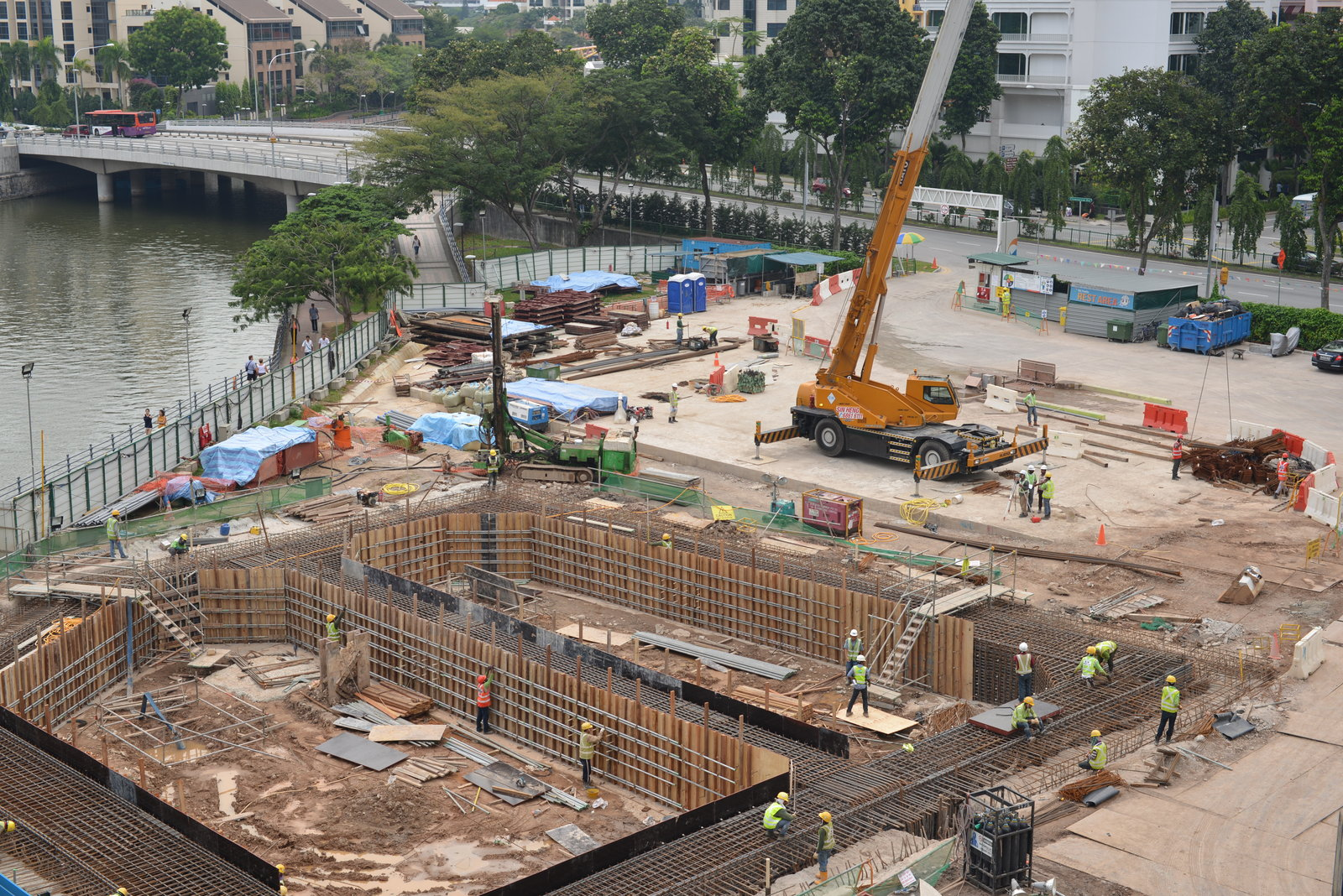
The station's construction required the diversion of the Singapore River

The Central Expressway, which is located only 5 metres (16 ft) away from the station, had to be closely monitored for any structural movement during the station's construction. Diaphragm walls were erected while the station itself is constructed using the top-down method, to minimise any movement to the Expressway.

The DTL tunnels from Chinatown to this station had to be constructed in the narrow space between two Housing and Development Board (HDB) blocks and the State Courts. The Singapore River also had to be diverted for the tunnels’ construction. To overcome the space constraints, the DTL tunnels were arranged in a stacked arrangement, while being constructed near the foundations of the State Courts and the HDB blocks.

Before deciding on the alignment through the Singapore River, 20 alternative tunnel routes were deliberated by the LTA before they were deemed unsafe or damaging to the environment. The river diversion was necessary as tunnelling directly underneath the river would risk ground subsidence or tunnel flooding. The Tunnel Boring Machine (TBM) used could be obstructed by debris that remained stuck into the riverbed. There were considerations by the LTA to dam the river but it would have disrupted people's livelihoods and tour boat operations on the river.

The river diversion, which started in 2012, involved removing components of the river embankment, constructing a series of dams, strengthening the soil and excavating a new 40-by-100-by-7-metre (131 by 328 by 23 ft) canal on the river's west bank. A new embankment was built across the original river, which was drained and filled with soil. The debris along the tunnels’ route was removed using piling rigs before tunnelling works commenced. To minimise river pollution from the works (as the river is connected to the Marina Reservoir), the LTA maintained adequate hydraulic flows to ensure the water's cleanliness. After boring through the area, the river was realigned to its original course.

=== Construction of tunnels between Fort Canning and Bencoolen ===
The tunnels to Bencoolen station, which were constructed using Earth Pressure Balance Tunnel Boring Machines (TBMs), had to be constructed underneath the National Museum of Singapore. Ground settlement markers were installed in advance of the bored tunnels passing beneath the National Museum, together with building settlement markers in both the extension and main blocks of the Museum. The maximum ground settlement recorded during tunnelling was 18 mm (0.71 in), while the maximum building settlement was only 11 mm (0.43 in). These results indicate that the tunnelling had minimal impact on the settlement behaviour of the piles supporting the buildings.

The tunnels were also built rather close to the operational tunnels of the North East, North–South and Circle lines. Various instruments were used to monitor the live tunnels to ensure the construction of the DTL tunnels did not impact the train operations. The installation of these instruments in the tunnels required approval from the train operators. To maximise efficiency and reduce the risks of the construction, the geology along the tunnels from Fort Canning to Bencoolen was analysed and the tunnel boring machines' cutter heads were changed at strategic places. (Note: It was decided for the cutterhead intervention to be at least 20 m (66 ft) away from the tunnels to minimise any settlement impact.)

The tunnels were largely bored in Fort Canning Boulder Bed, which is a colluvial deposit consisting of strong sandstone, quartzite boulders and cobbles embedded in a very stiff clay-rich soil. The surrounding material is typically a hard sandy clayey silt or sandy silty clay. Before crossing the NEL tunnels, the TBM drive mainly used knife cutters, but these were replaced with roller disc cutters near the NEL southbound tunnel due to abnormal ground conditions with high quartz content. For the Bukit Panjang-bound tunnel, roller disc cutters were used predominantly to reduce severe cutter wear, with some knife cutters retained at the cutterhead centre to mitigate clogging caused by stiff clay. These centre knife cutters were later also replaced by roller disc cutters for the CCL crossing in the Bukit Panjang–bound tunnel and the NSL/CCL crossing in the Expo–bound tunnel, as effective soil conditioning successfully controlled clogging during excavation.

The construction project was recognised by the Institution of Engineers Singapore as one of Singapore's top 50 engineering achievements since its independence. In addition, the project was awarded the International Tunnel Association Tunnelling and Underground Space Awards and Singapore Concrete Institute's Excellence Awards. In May 2018, the project achieved the Building and Construction Authority (BCA) Design and Engineering Safety Excellence Award for that year.

== Station details ==
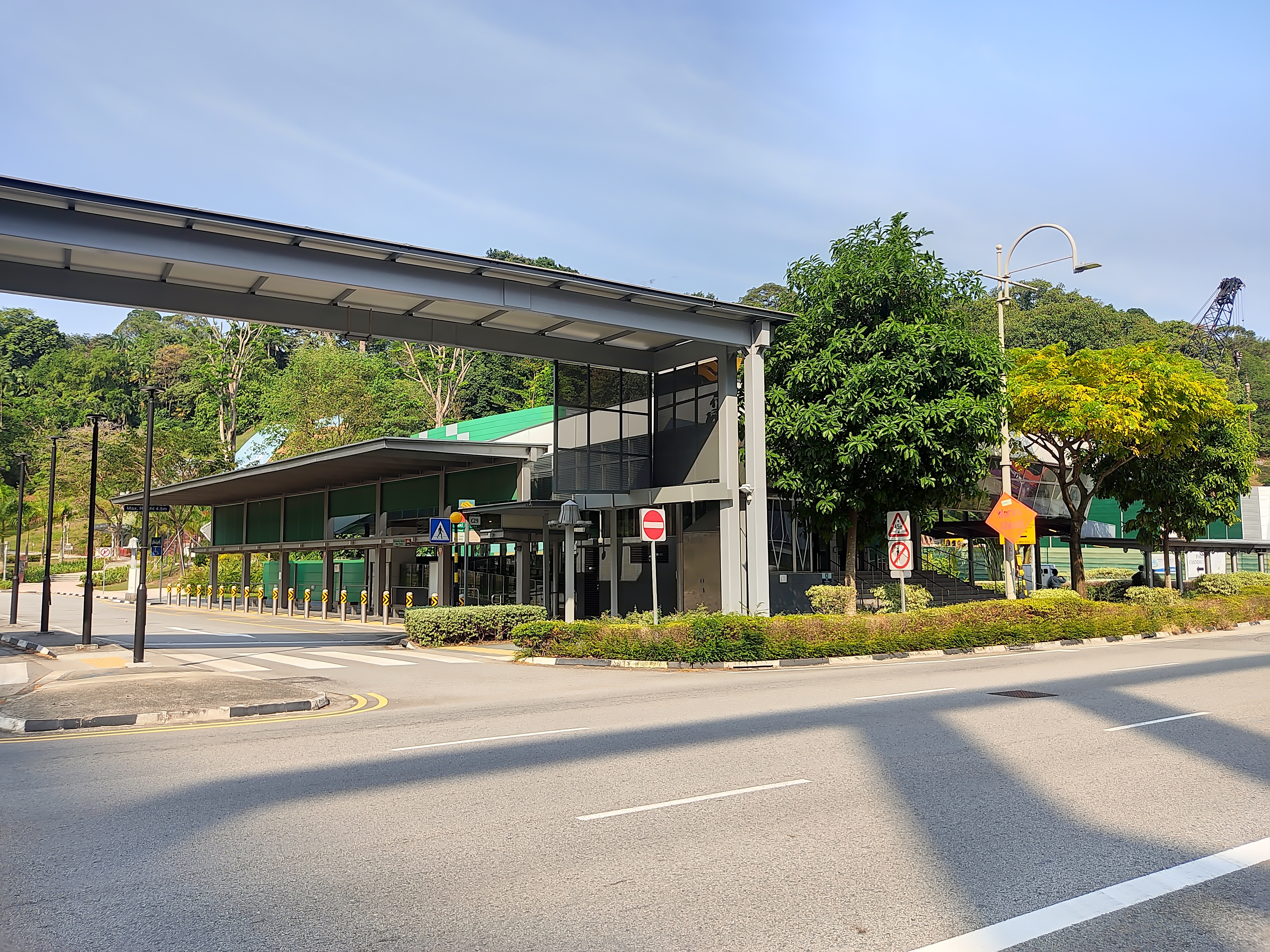
Exit B of the station at the foot of the hill

Fort Canning station serves the Downtown Line (DTL) between the Chinatown and Bencoolen stations and has an official station code of DT20. As the name suggests, the station is located at the foot of Fort Canning Hill underneath River Valley Road. Surrounding developments around the station include Clarke Quay, Robertson Quay, UE Shopping Mall and Fort Canning Park, in addition to religious sites such as the Church of Sacred Heart and Sri Thendayupathani Temple. The station formerly served Liang Court, now to be replaced by CanningHill Piers, a mixed-use development integrated with the station. The station is also within walking distance to Clarke Quay station on the North East Line.

The two-level station is 17.5 metres (57 ft) below ground. The station has two exits and has a length of 250 metres (270 yd). To reflect its location near the Fort Canning Park, the station has a natural green theme with an arched ceiling over the station's interior. As a tribute to the former National Theatre that once stood near the station site, abstract patterns of the theatre are featured on the concourse stone walls and railings.

Within the station, each side of the platforms has a cripple siding intended for the withdrawal and storage of trains. This is the first such arrangement on the MRT network, as usually sidings are located along the tunnel's length. Due to the limited space available, the sidings had to be constructed within the station; this reduced construction costs since it would not be necessary to build a separate cut-and-cover structure for the siding on another piece of land.

=== Artworks ===
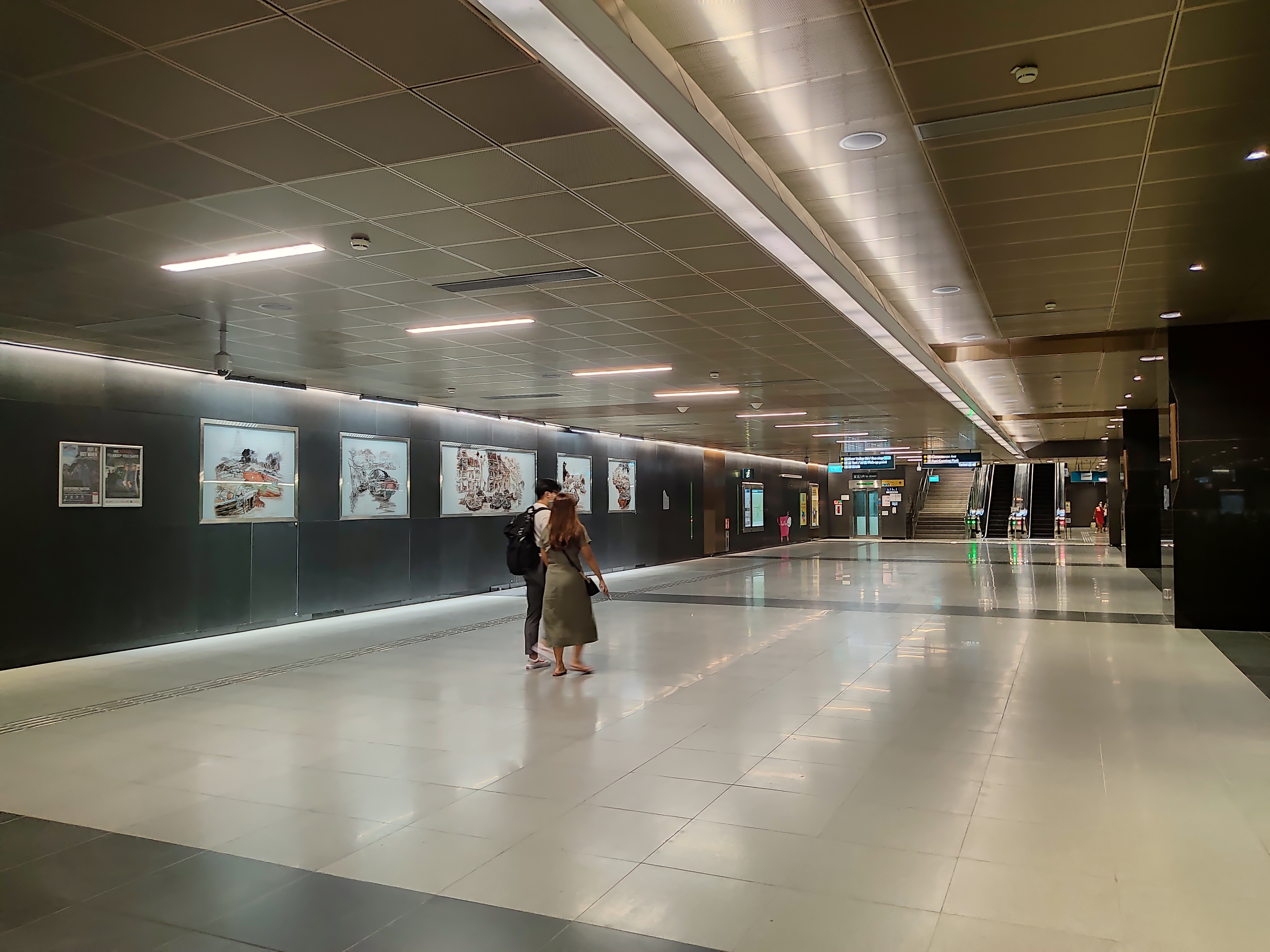
The artwork along the concourse level of the station

Commissioned as part of the MRT system's Art-in-Transit (AiT) programme, (Note: Public art showcase which integrates artworks into the MRT network) Through His Eyes by Lim Tze Peng is displayed at this station. The collection includes a panorama 3 metres (9.8 ft) wide, depicting the transportation of goods from the bumboats to the lorries and shophouses on the riverside. Two artworks flanked either side of the panorama. The Clarke Quay side showcases bumboats in front of the shophouses, and another of bumboats in front of the former Supreme Court and Old Parliament House. On the Fort Canning side, another work shows the bumboats at the riverside, and another of bumboats in the river facing Coleman Bridge and the clocktower of Victoria Concert Hall. Reflecting the history of Fort Canning and the Singapore River, which used to be a bustling port, these watercolour paintings were depicted from the perspective of Singapore's founder Sir Stamford Raffles at his residence on the Hill.

Having begun his painting career to depict Singapore's fast-disappearing landscapes during its modernisation, Lim views the work as part of his lifelong commitment to documenting Singapore's landscapes. He believed that artists should remain rooted in their homeland. As Lim no longer works as an artist, the five works were chosen by the AiT team among the artist's private collection at his studio in Telok Kurau. These were originally painted in Chinese ink on rice paper, before being scanned, enlarged and reproduced on glass using ceramic printing. The artist intends for commuters to experience the work "Through His Eyes" as the river sights "worthy of our remembrance and memories", and hopes the collection will remind future generations of the Singapore River's formative role in the country's development.

Also displayed at Fort Canning station is Another Day (The Coolies) by Chong Fah Cheong, a sculpture donated by CapitaLand Development. Two lean, muscular coolies were depicted, sharing a simple meal before returning to the grueling work of hauling cargo across sun-drenched gangplanks. Through these iconic figures, Chong draws on his Singaporean heritage to honor the city's history of labor and resilience.

== Notes and references ==
=== Bibliography ===
- Feng, Zengkun (2017). Downtown Line: Soaring to new heights (PDF). Singapore: Straits Times Press Pte Ltd. ISBN 978-981-4747-66-0. OCLC 1003852882.
- Goh, Kok Hun; Ng, Shie Shyang (Gerald); Wong, Kah Chou (10 October 2016). "Case Histories of Bored Tunnelling Below Buildings in Singapore Downtown Line". Case Histories of Bored Tunnelling Below Buildings in Singapore Downtown Line (3): 149–161. doi:10.4417/IJGCH-03-03-02. ISSN 1790-2045.
- Sze, Esen (Yu Sheng); Yee, (Jim) Tung Chuan; Kim, (Henry) Ikhyung; Osborne, Nick H.; Chang, Kin Boon; Siew, Richard (2016). "Tunnelling undercrossing existing live MRT tunnels". Tunnelling and Underground Space Technology. 57: 241–256. doi:10.1016/j.tust.2016.02.013.
- "The Arup Journal 2018 Issue 1" (PDF). The Arup Journal (1). Arup. 2018. OCLC 162425042. Archived (PDF) from the original on 26 February 2021.
- Zhuang, Justin; Soh, Darren (2022). Art in Transit: Downtown Line Singapore. Singapore: Land Transport Authority. ISBN 978-981-18-3967-2. OCLC 1342054525.
