= Bras Basah MRT station =

Mass Rapid Transit station in Singapore

Bras Basah CC2 百胜 பிராஸ் பாசா
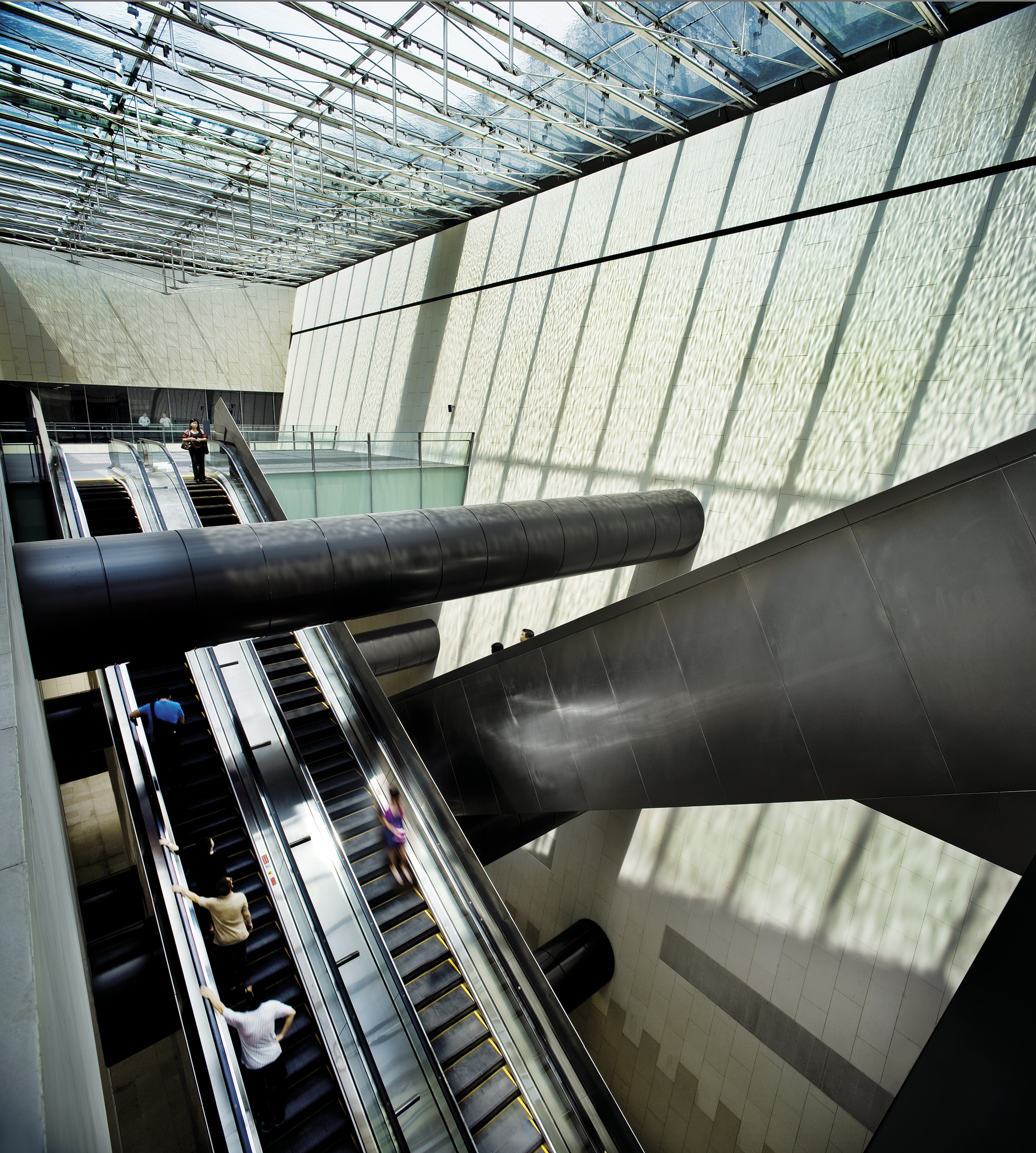
- Escalators in Bras Basah station underneath the reflective pool, which is a key feature of the station.

General information
- Location: 65 Bras Basah Road, Singapore 189561
- Coordinates: 01°17′49″N 103°51′02″E
- System: Mass Rapid Transit (MRT) station
- Owner: Land Transport Authority
- Operator: SMRT Trains
- Line: Circle Line
- Platforms: 2 (1 island platform)
- Tracks: 2
- Connections: DT21 Bencoolen; Bus, Taxi

Construction
- Structure type: Underground
- Depth: 35 metres (115 ft)
- Platform levels: 1
- Parking: Yes (Singapore Management University)
- Accessible: Yes

History
- Opened: 17 April 2010; 16 years ago
- Former names: Museum

Passengers
- June 2024: 3,978 per day

Services
Preceding station	Mass Rapid Transit	Following station
Dhoby Ghaut Terminus	Circle Line	Esplanade towards Prince Edward Road
Track layout
Location
- Location within Singapore Rail central area

Bras Basah MRT station (/ˈbrɑːs ˌbɑːsɑː/) is an underground Mass Rapid Transit (MRT) station on the Circle Line (CCL) located in the Museum planning area, Singapore. It is underneath Bras Basah Road, bordering Waterloo Street and Queen Street. Located next to the Singapore Management University (SMU), this station is in proximity to the National Museum of Singapore, the Singapore Art Museum, Peranakan Museum and School of the Arts, Singapore. The station is connected to the nearby Bencoolen station on the Downtown Line (DTL) via an unpaid link.

Initially announced as Museum MRT station as part of the Marina MRT line, it was later incorporated into the CCL Stage 1. Along with the other stations on Stages 1 and 2 of the CCL, the station started operations on 17 April 2010. The design of the station by WOHA was commissioned through the Marina line Architectural Design Competition and was awarded the "Best Transport Building" in 2009 at the World Architecture Festival. The CCL station features an Art-in-Transit video work The Amazing Neverending Underwater Adventures! by Tan Kai Syng.

== History ==
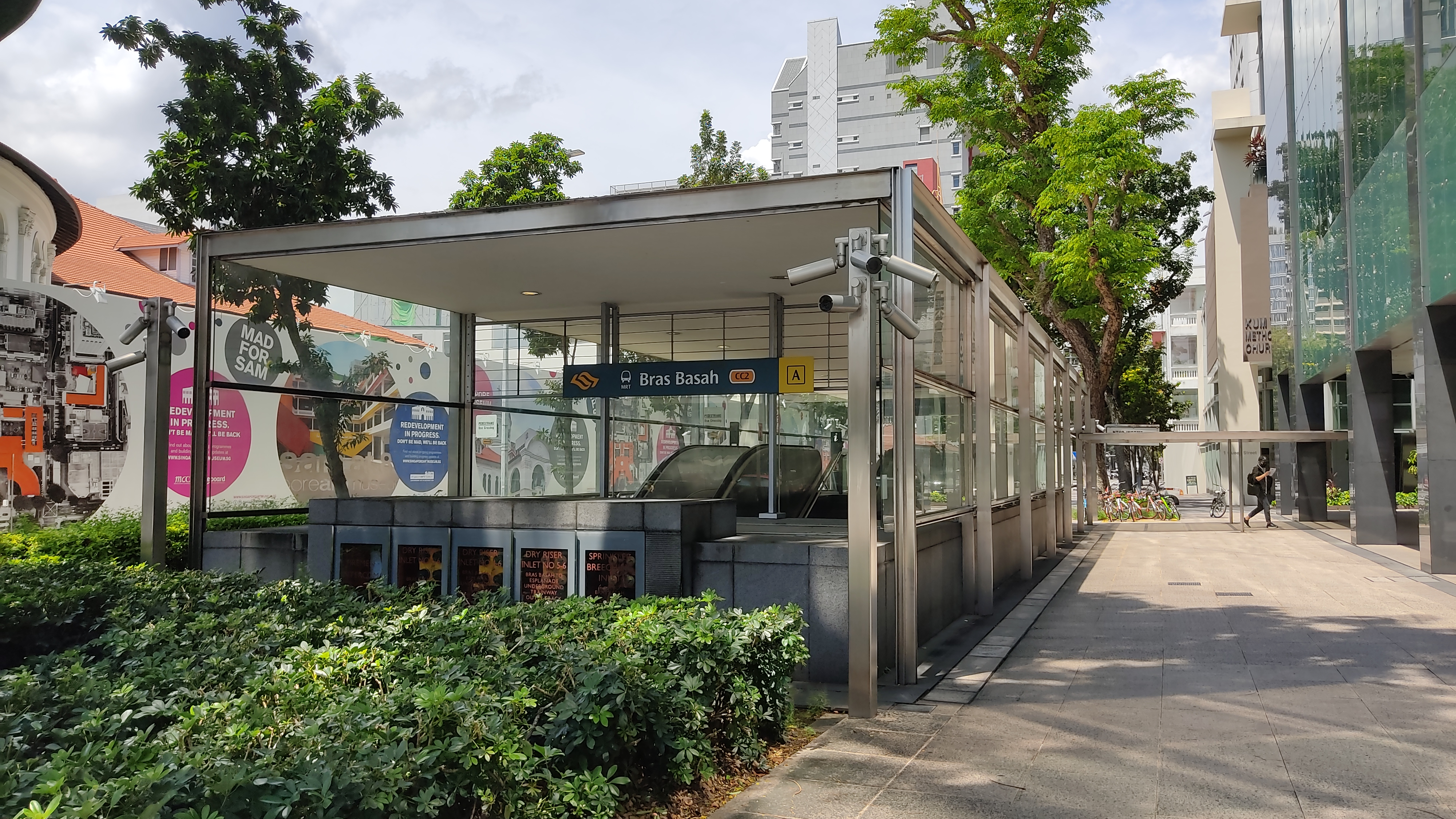
Exit A of Bras Basah station

The station was first announced as Art Museum station in November 1999 as part of the Marina MRT line (MRL). The MRL consisted of six stations from the Dhoby Ghaut to Stadium stations. In 2001, the station working name was revised to "Museum" and would be part of CCL Stage 1 when the MRL was incorporated into the CCL. Contract 825 for the design and construction of Bras Basah station and associated tunnels was awarded to Shanghai Tunnel Engineering Co. (Singapore) Pte Ltd and a joint venture with Woh Hup and NCC at a sum of S$343.9 million (US$192 million) on 19 December 2001. The contract also included the construction of the Dhoby Ghaut, Esplanade and Promenade stations.

To facilitate the construction, on 10 June 2002, part of Bras Basah Road had to be temporarily realigned. On 15 March 2003, the junctions of Queen Street/Bras Basah Road and Waterloo Street/Bras Basah Road were temporarily closed and the service road adjacent to Oxford Hotel was converted into one-way road in the direction from Queen Street to Waterloo Street. In 2007, the diverted roads have been reinstated as the station undergoes architectural, electrical and mechanical works. On 17 April 2010, the station opened as part of Stages 1 and 2 of the CCL.

== Station details ==
=== Etymology ===
The name Bras Basah (Modern Spelling: Beras Basah) means "wet rice" in Malay – beras means harvested rice with husk removed, and basah means wet. The station initially had the working name "Museum", which was subsequently changed to its current name in 2005 through a public poll.

=== Services and location ===
The station serves the Circle Line, situated between the Dhoby Ghaut and Esplanade stations on the CCL's inner spur. The official station code is CC2. The station operates daily between 5:38 am (6:06 am on Sundays and public holidays) and 12:01 am. Train frequencies vary from 2 to 4 minutes during weekday peak hours and from 5 to 6 minutes at other times. Bras Basah station has an unpaid link to the nearby Bencoolen station on the DTL.

The station is located underneath Bras Basah Road between the Singapore Art Museum and the Li Ka Shing library of the Singapore Management University. As its working name suggests, the station serves various museums including the Peranakan Museum, the China Cultural Centre, the Philatelic Museum and the Nanyang Academy of Fine Arts National Museum, and various cultural landmarks such as Cathedral of the Good Shepherd, Fort Canning, Chijmes, Bencoolen Mosque and Kwan Im Thong Hood Cho Temple. Other surrounding developments include Bras Basah Complex, Carlton Hotel, Fairmont Hotel, Peace Centre and the Rendezvous Hotel.

=== Architecture ===
The station platforms at 35 metres (115 ft) below ground

The station is 35 metres (115 ft) below ground and was the deepest station when it first opened until the completion of the DTL platforms at Promenade station in 2013, which has a depth of 42 metres (138 ft). The station was constructed deep underground as the line has to cross underneath the East–West Line beneath Victoria Street to reach the station. It is also the station with the longest escalator in the MRT network at 41 metres (135 ft), stretching from the ticket concourse to the transfer level and takes approximately one minute to travel.

The station design by WOHA, who also designed the nearby School of the Arts (SOTA), resolves two conditions needed for the station: allowing a visual connection to the exterior to enhance the travel experience for the commuters, and enabling the station to blend into the landscape in the historic district and park location. A reflection pool, which also acts as the station roof, allows skylight to enter the station, and functions as a landscape element on the surface. With skylight entering the station, minimal artificial light is required for the station during the day. The natural light improves way-finding and safety for the commuters. The ventilation shafts of the station blends into the landscape, avoiding obstruction of the view across the site to the surrounding civic buildings.

The station design was commissioned through the Marina line Architectural Design Competition jointly organised by the Land Transport Authority (LTA) and the Singapore Institute of Architects (SIA). At the 2001 SIA Awards, the SIA had given a prize to LTA for 'Excellence in Architectural Design Competitions'. In 2009, the station was awarded the "Best Transport Building" at the World Architecture Festival, on the basis that the design gives "precedence to the surrounding, historically important, colonial structures, creating a piazza-like urban space to the station underneath" and noted the design's functionality to allow natural light into the station. The station later won the Award for International Architecture at the Australian Institute of Architects' (AIA's) 2010 National Architecture Awards. In addition, it won the Chicago Athenaeum and the European Centre for Architecture Art Design and Urban Studies and International Architecture Awards in 2011.

=== Public artwork ===
A video work, The Amazing Neverending Underwater Adventures! by Tan Kai Syng, is displayed at the station. The work was installed as part of the Art-in-Transit (AiT) programme — a showcase that integrates public artwork in the MRT network. The video depicts the protagonist Desyphus, a "perpetual commuter", on a quest aboard the Circle Line. During the journey, the protagonist fights against "Life's Big Quirks, Ecstasies and Agonies", while exploring points of interest and creating "smaller tales" that will contribute to the "(hi-)stories" of Bras Basah. Projected on the wall below the reflecting pool of the station every evening from 7.29 pm to 10 pm, the video intends to depict the themes of travel, time, memory and the MRT line.

The work incorporates riddles with lines taken from literature such as Alice in Wonderland, cliché Greek quotes and other works by famous authors such as Samuel Beckett. Tan decided to incorporate riddles after seeing poetry in the London Underground commissioned by the British Transport for London. The scenes in the videos were taken from several sources, including the artist's own travels to London and Tokyo, an underwater shoot and rare archival footage showing the demolition of the old national library near the station.

While juxtaposing the text, visuals and audio, Tan intended to show the complex relationship and tension between words and images. The work is thus fragmented and not intended to be viewed in one sitting; different styles and subjects are shown at different times since the work is meant to appeal to a wider audience. Curator Karen Lim as well as station architect WOHA, which reserved space specifically for such a work, both praised the piece for its perfect integration with the minimalist station architecture. As the sunlight interferes with the video projection, the work is displayed only during the evenings. The audio is restricted to the concourse to prevent conflict with regular station announcements.
