= Bencoolen MRT station =

Mass Rapid Transit station in Singapore

Bencoolen DT21 明古连 பென்கூலன்
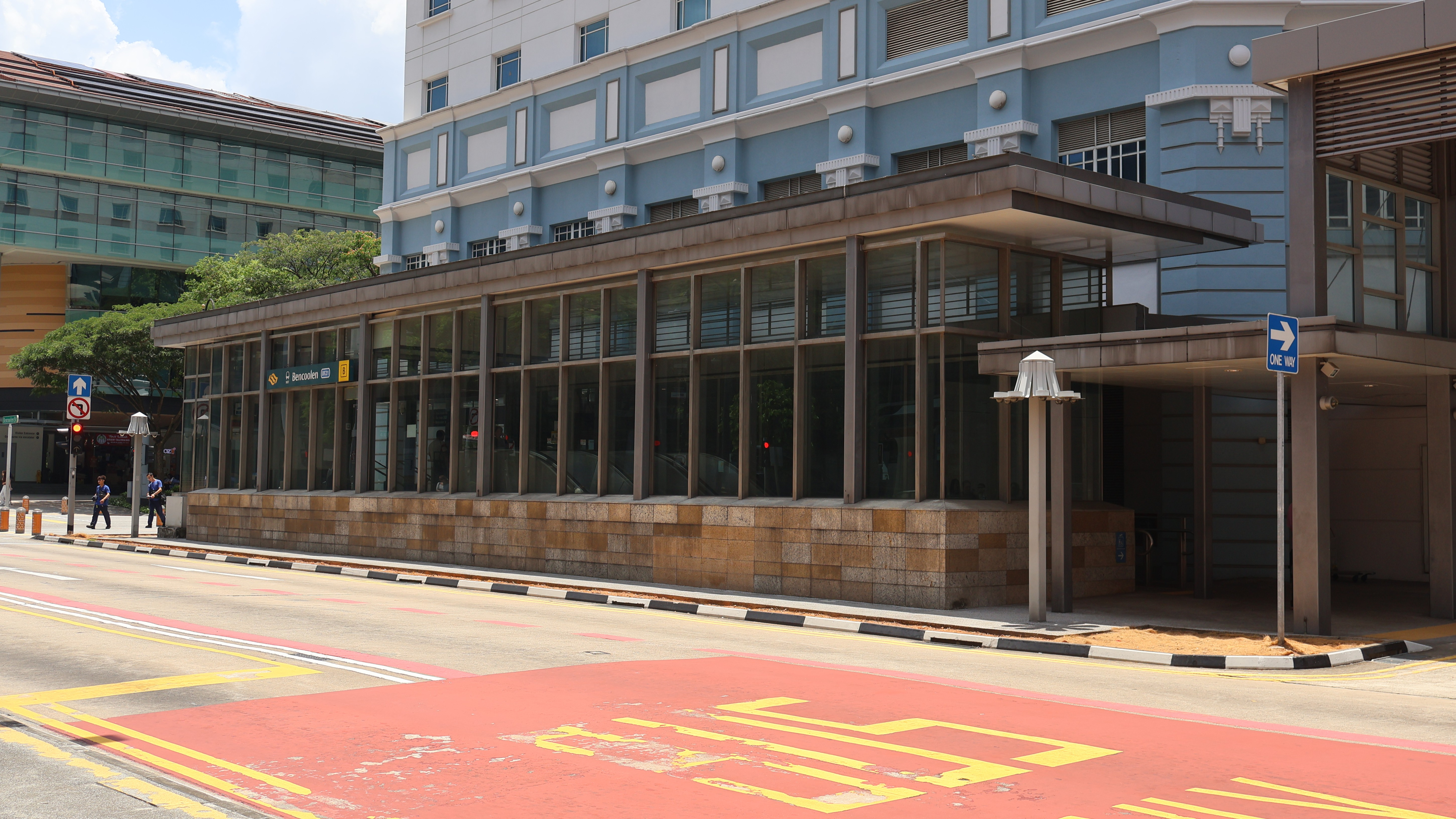
- Exit B of Bencoolen station along Bencoolen Street

General information
- Location: 31 Bencoolen Street, Singapore 189658
- Coordinates: 01°17′56″N 103°51′01″E
- System: Mass Rapid Transit (MRT) station
- Owner: Land Transport Authority
- Operator: SBS Transit
- Line: Downtown Line
- Platforms: 2 (1 island platform)
- Tracks: 2
- Connections: CC2 Bras Basah; DT13 Rochor; Bus, Taxi

Construction
- Structure type: Underground
- Depth: 43 metres (141 ft)
- Platform levels: 1
- Accessible: Yes

Other information
- Station code: BCL

History
- Opened: 21 October 2017; 9 years ago
- Former names: Waterloo

Passengers
- June 2024: 6,536 per day

Services
Preceding station	Mass Rapid Transit	Following station
Fort Canning towards Bukit Panjang	Downtown Line	Jalan Besar towards Expo
Track layout
Location
- Location within Singapore Rail central area

Bencoolen MRT station is an underground Mass Rapid Transit (MRT) station on the Downtown Line (DTL) in Singapore. Located under Bencoolen Street, the station serves primarily the Nanyang Academy of Fine Arts (NAFA), Singapore Management University and surrounding developments. At 43 metres (141 ft) below street level, Bencoolen is the deepest station in Singapore.

The station was first announced in August 2010 when the DTL Stage 3 (DTL 3) stations were revealed. Constructing the station and the connecting tunnels was one of the most difficult projects on the DTL due to its location in a narrow site and the need to construct the DTL tunnels near the existing operational tunnels. The station was completed on 21 October 2017, along with the revamping of Bencoolen Street above. The station features Tracing Memories by NAFA students as part of the Art-in-Transit programme.

== History ==
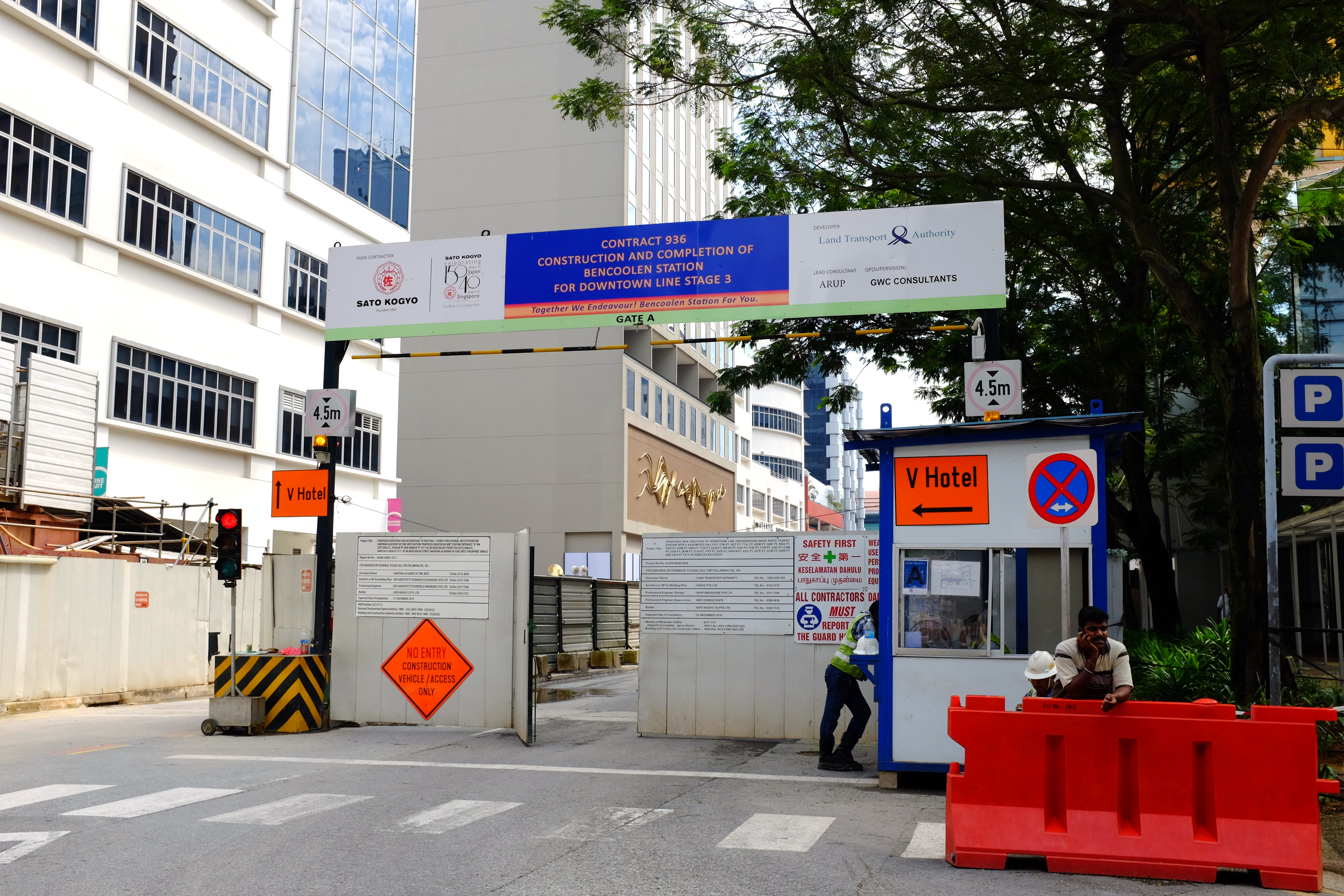
Entrance to the construction site in September 2013

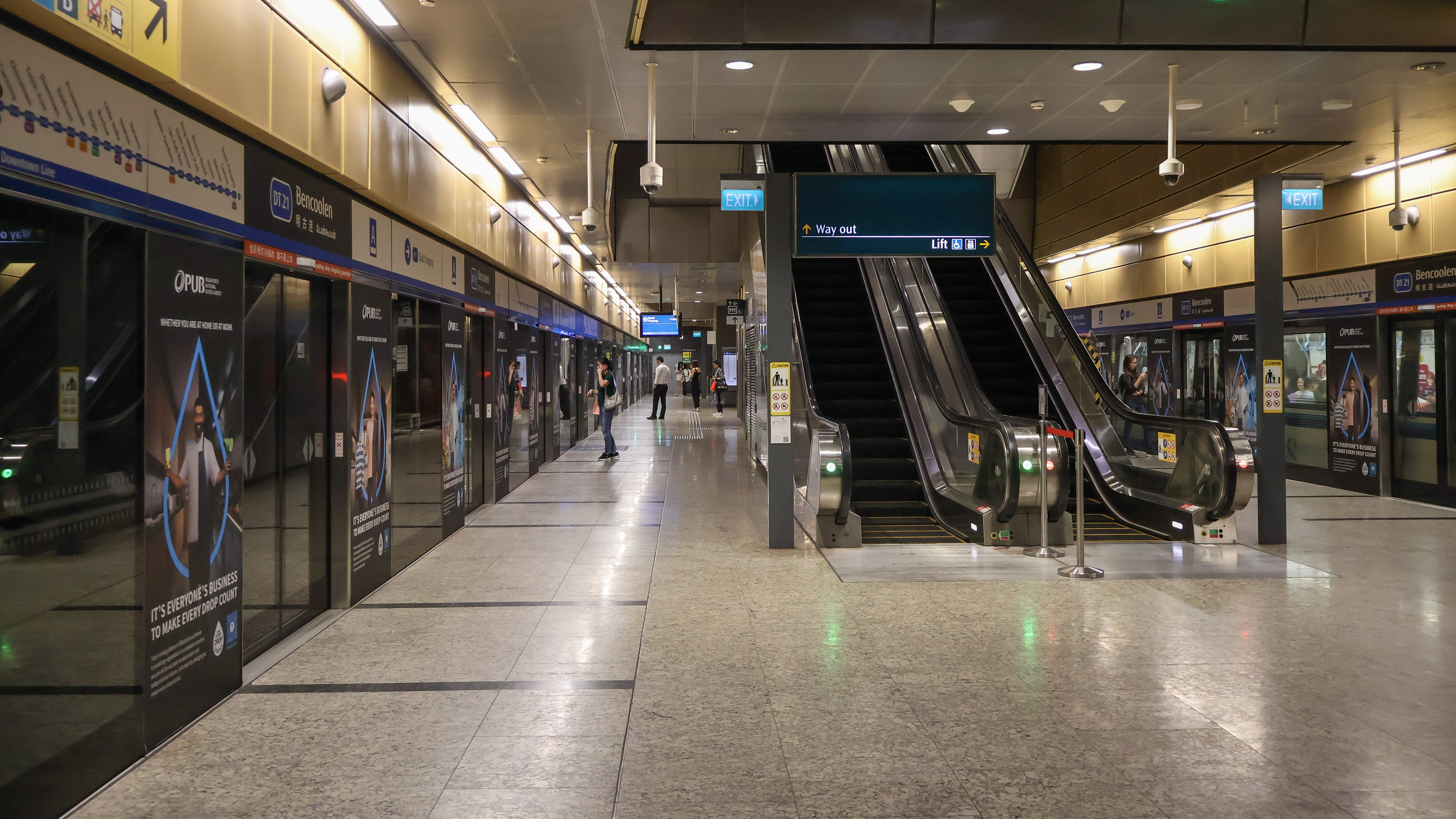
Platform level of the station at 43 metres (141 ft) below ground

On 20 August 2010, the Land Transport Authority (LTA) announced that Bencoolen station would be part of the 21-kilometre (13-mile) Downtown Line Stage 3 (DTL 3), consisting of 16 stations between River Valley (now Fort Canning) and Expo. The line was expected to be completed in 2017. The contract for the design and construction of Bencoolen station and associated tunnels — Contract 936 — was awarded to Sato Kogyo at a sum of S$177.58 million (US$93.5 million) in April 2011. Construction of the station and the tunnels started in the second quarter of that year and was targeted to be completed in 2017.

The station and associated tunnels were constructed close to the operational tunnels of the Circle (CCL) and North–South (NSL) lines and underneath various commercial developments, which explains the need to construct the station at a depth of 43 metres (141 ft). Various instruments were used to monitor the CCL and NSL tunnels to ensure the construction of the DTL tunnels did not impact the train operations. To maximise efficiency and reduce the risks of the construction, the geology along the tunnels from Fort Canning to Bencoolen was analysed and the cutter heads of the tunnel boring machines were changed at places where it was most convenient to do so.

The geology of the station site was composed of soft soil overlaying a thick boulder bed. Due to the very tough ground conditions, mechanical and chemical means were used to break down the boulders. To minimise inconvenience to the residents of the surrounding buildings, working hours were restricted. The LTA and contractors cooperated with the hotels and surrounding developments to deal with noise and environmental problems.

As there was limited space, a section of Bencoolen Street was closed to traffic from Prinsep Link to Bras Basah Road from 16 October 2011 to 10 December 2016. The road was reinstated as a one-way street after the construction, with pedestrian walkways and bike lanes. During the construction, on 3 March 2017, a burst pipe caused a flood at the station. The valve was turned off within 15 minutes and the faulty pipe was reinforced.

On 31 May 2017, the LTA announced that the station, together with the rest of DTL 3, would be opened on 21 October that year. Passengers were offered a preview of the station along with the other DTL 3 stations at the DTL 3 Open House on 15 October.

== Station details ==
=== Services ===
Bencoolen station serves the Downtown Line (DTL) and is situated between the Fort Canning and Jalan Besar stations. The official station code is DT21. The station operates between 6:06 am and 12:12 am daily, with headways of 2 to 5 minutes. The station is also connected to the nearby CCL Bras Basah station by the SMU underpass linkway, this connection is not shown on system maps provided by LTA.

=== Location ===
Situated underneath Bencoolen Street near the junction with Bras Basah Road, the station serves the educational institutions of the Nanyang Academy of Fine Arts (NAFA), Singapore Management University (SMU) and the Manulife Centre. The station also serves Parklane Shopping Centre and Sunshine Plaza. It formerly served Peace Centre, which closed on 28 January 2024.

=== Station design ===
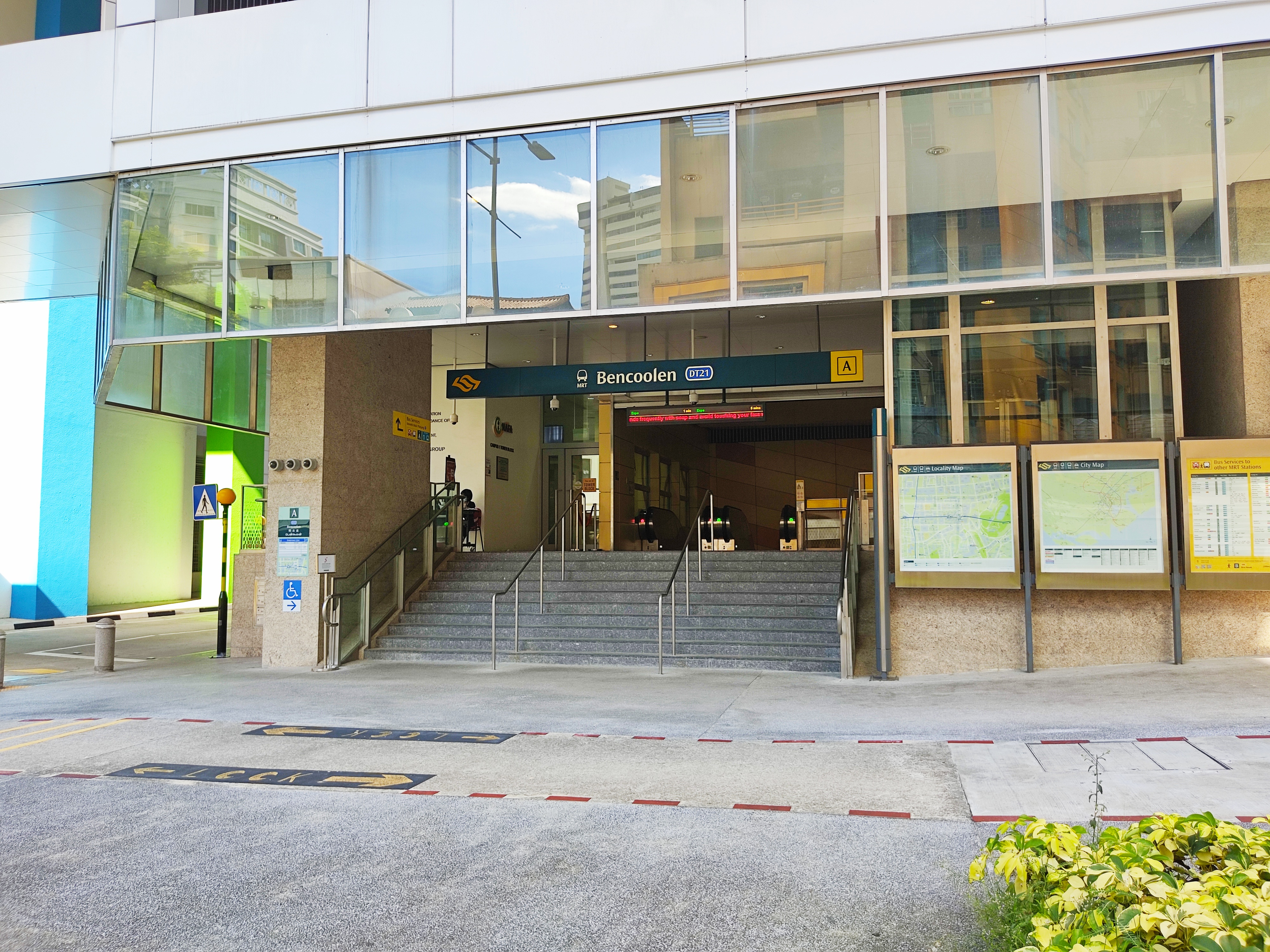
Exit A of the station integrated with the NAFA campus

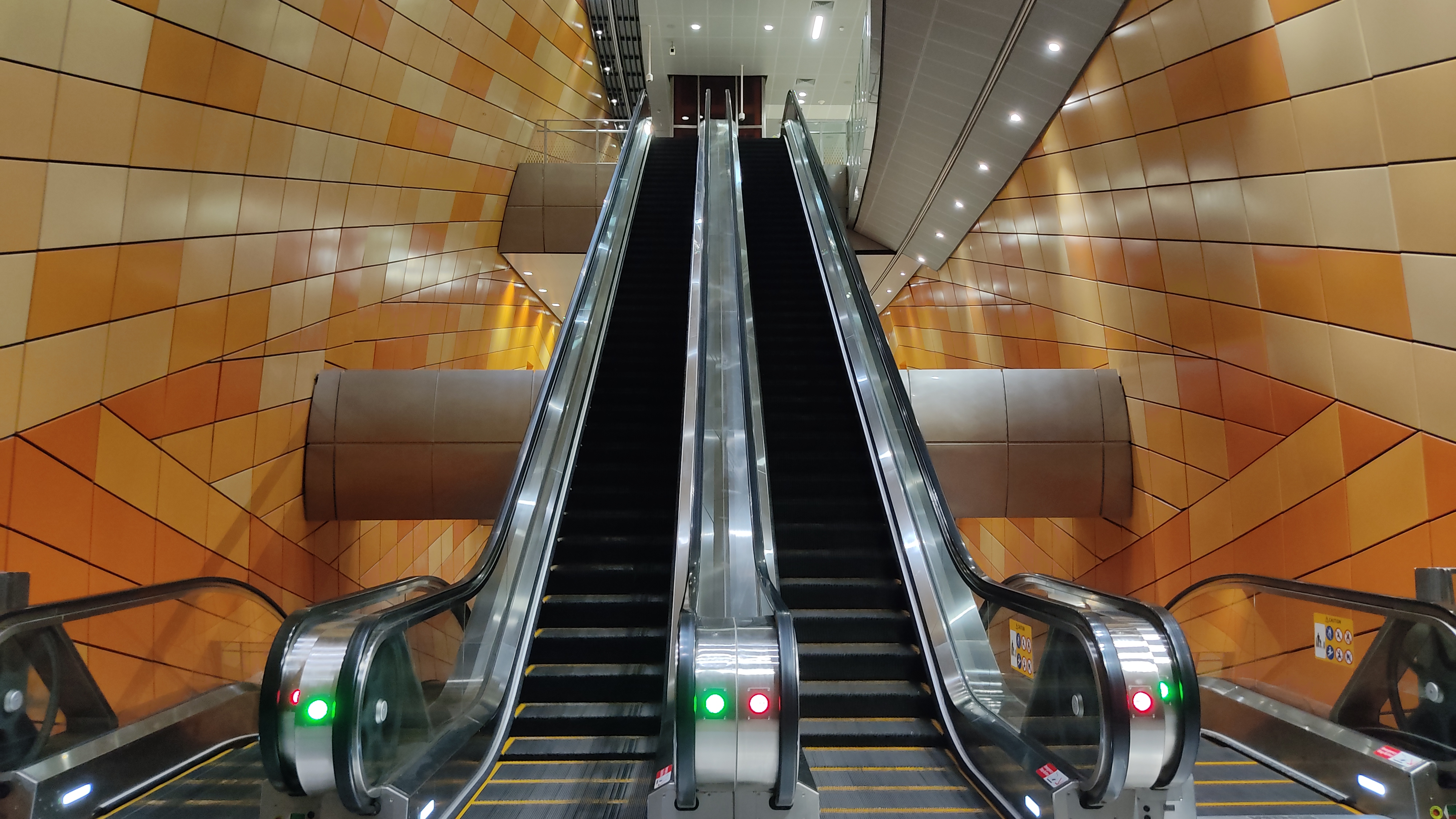
The interior of the station with curved walls in earth-tone colours

The six-level underground station reaches 43 metres (141 ft) below ground and is currently the deepest station on the MRT network, being 1 metre (3.3 ft) deeper than Promenade station. This title will eventually be replaced when the Cross Island Line (CRL) platforms at Pasir Ris station are completed, at 47 metres (154 ft) below ground.

The station and the tunnels are placed at that depth to avoid intersecting the existing infrastructure at the surface, as well as the other rail tunnels in the way of the alignment. The station, designed by Aedas, is only 22 metres (72 ft) wide and 140 metres (460 ft) long, as the distance between the buildings along the street is 25 metres (82 ft) wide.

The station has three entrances. Exit A is at ground level and inside of the NAFA Tower Block above the station and the underpass link to the SMU. The station was constructed alongside NAFA's fourth campus. This integration allows students to access the campus easily, regardless of the weather conditions. The glass and frame structure of Exit B at ground level, is designed in a vintage style to "harmonise" with the colonial-style exterior of Hotel Rendezvous near the station. Exit C is an underground exit leading directly to the SMU underpass.

The curving interior walls symbolise canyon walls and earth-tone colours represent the many layers of the soil, emphasising the depth of space. The glass walls of the passenger lifts were tinted in maroon so that the journey to the platforms looks like a descent to the Earth's core.

=== Bencoolen Street redesign ===
At the surface, Bencoolen Street was transformed into an enhanced pedestrian walkway. Two of the four lanes are permanently closed to make way for a communal space, which includes a wide footpath for pedestrians and a bicycle lane. The transformation was part of Singapore's government Walk-Cycle-Ride initiative, which was aimed to make the country "car-lite" and allow more opportunities to walk and cycle. One of the remaining lanes on the street was converted into a dedicated bus lane.

The area is designed to be pedestrian-friendly, with sheltered linkways from the station to the surrounding developments. The surface structures of the station, comprising the entrances and vent shafts, were placed to preserve the buildings' facades while establishing a "vibrant, comfortable" walking environment above ground. The street also features seven "funky" benches designed by students and alumni through a competition held by NAFA. The bench designs include a dog-shaped double-level bench, another shaped like a cat on its back, and animal-shaped branches made of fibreglass. These benches were intended to add some innovation to the streetscape. A total of 125 bicycle parking lots were installed at various places along the street.

=== Station artwork ===
Bencoolen station features Tracing Memories by NAFA students as part of the MRT system's Art-in-Transit programme, a public art showcase which integrates artworks into the MRT network. The artwork consists of two murals at two ends of a station linkway, each featuring six figures linked together by a thread. Each depicts a student activity broken into these figures reflecting a "stop motion" effect intended to convey movement in transit. The line connecting these figures is to show the connections of commuters through the station and the DTL. The figures also served as inconspicuous navigation aids, directing commuters to the two different colleges near the station, Those with laptops point towards SMU, while those with art materials indicate the way to NAFA.

Through NAFA's call for students to propose concepts for the station art, two teams were shortlisted: fine arts students Sheryl Law, Reena Ng, Tay Yuling, Tsai Chingwen and Ooi Qiyang, as well as design students Poornima Bargotra and Sheetal Muralidhara. Both proposed to depict landmarks around Bencoolen but in different styles; NAFA and LTA decided to combine these concepts. Taking inspiration from the local community, the students gathered 800 original photographs of buildings, objects and people submitted through various online and physical campaigns. They were subsequently sorted by colour and filled into the silhouettes.
