= Central Fire Station, Singapore =

Coordinates: 1°17′31.5″N 103°50′56.5″E

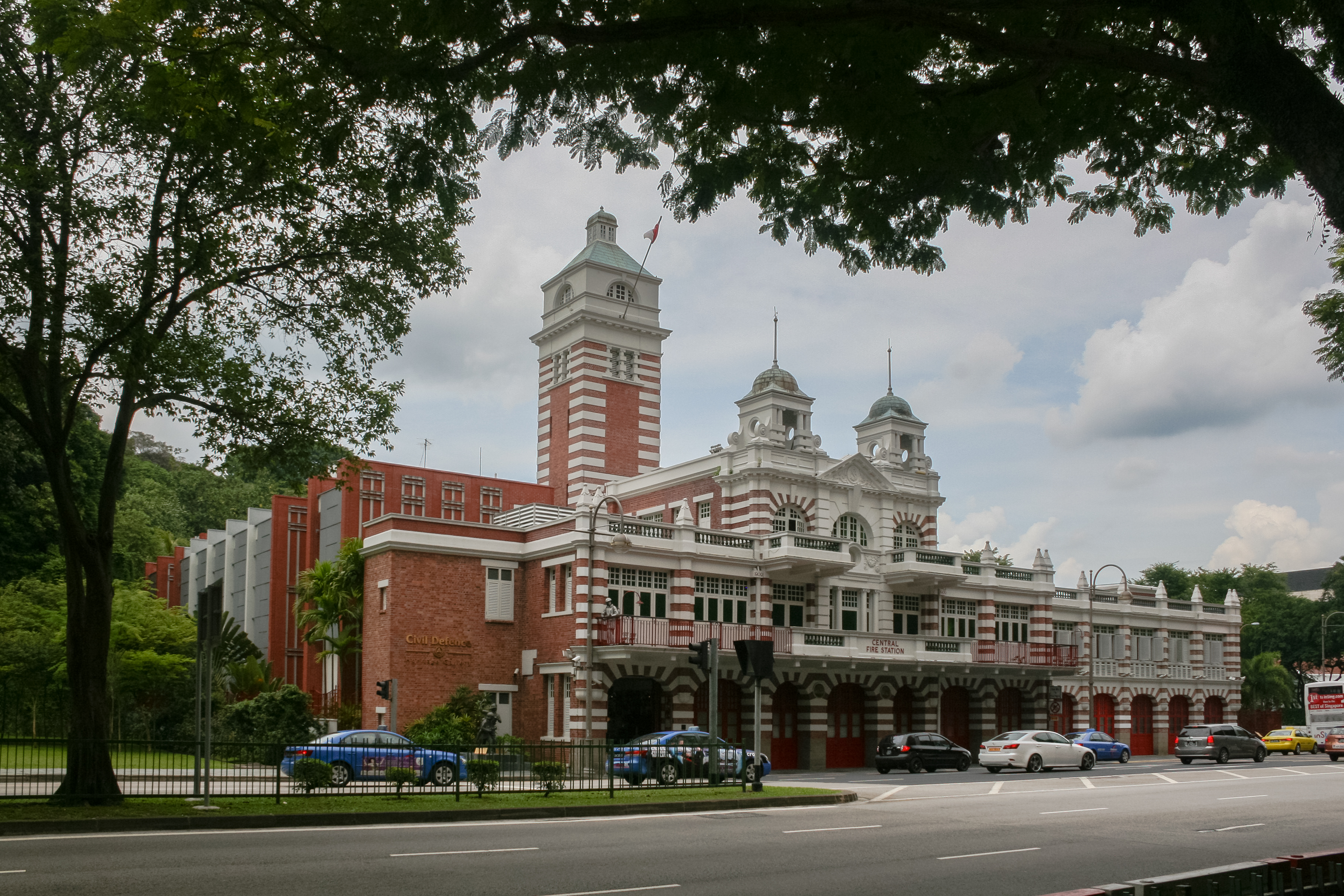
- Central Fire Station, which houses the Civil Defence Heritage Gallery

- Location within Singapore
- Location: 62 Hill Street, Singapore 179367

History
- Built: 1908; 118 years ago

Site notes
- Governing body: National Heritage Board

National monument of Singapore
- Designated: 18 December 1998; 27 years ago
- Reference no.: 41

Central Fire Station (Chinese: 中央消防局; Malay: Balai Bomba Pusat) is a fire station in Hill Street, Singapore. The oldest fire station in Singapore, it is located in the Museum Planning Area, which is within the Central Area. The building currently houses the Civil Defence Heritage Gallery, the official museum of the Singapore Civil Defence Force. The fire station is gazetted as a national monument of Singapore in 1996.

== History ==
In the late 19th century and early 20th century, Singapore had only small, makeshift fire stations around town for volunteer firefighters to operate out of. In 1905, Montague William Pett came up with the idea of having a Central Fire Station to replace the small, makeshift fire stations.

The Central Fire Station was built on Hill Street in 1908 at the cost of $64,000. The fire station had a three-storey main building and garages for motorised fire engines. It also had dormitories for about 68 firemen, areas for repairs, a training yard and a lookout tower.

Over the next 30 years, extensions were built to accommodate the growing fire fighting force.

In 1996, the Central Fire Station was gazetted as a national monument of Singapore.

In 1998, the fire station underwent major renovation to reconstruct internally and also cosmetic changes. Old building blocks were demolished to install modern facilities, such as new dormitories and parking bays for fire trucks. The original 32-m tower block was restored instead of being demolished.

A Civil Defence Heritage Gallery was also constructed to showcase the history of firefighting in Singapore, and trace the developments of civil defence in Singapore from the 19th century till the present day. The total costs of the renovation is estimated at $8.6m

The fire station remained operational during the reconstruction period which was completed by end-2001.

== Civil Defence Heritage Gallery ==
The Civil Defence Heritage Gallery housed in Central Fire Station showcases the history of firefighting in Singapore, and trace the developments of civil defence in Singapore from the 19th century till the present day.

The gallery was proposed in 1995 and construction started alongside the renovation of the Central Fire Station. It was completed in 2001 at a cost near to $3 million.

Visitors to the heritage gallery can learn about the civil defence's progression in Singapore through the years, with displays of antique fire engines and other firefighting equipment. There are customised interactive stations for a close-up experience of what fire fighters and rescuers go through during a mission. There are also tours up the watch tower of the Central Fire Station, which was Singapore's highest point during the 1920s.
