= Hill Street, Singapore =

Street in Singapore

- Chinese: 禧街 Malay: Jalan Bukit
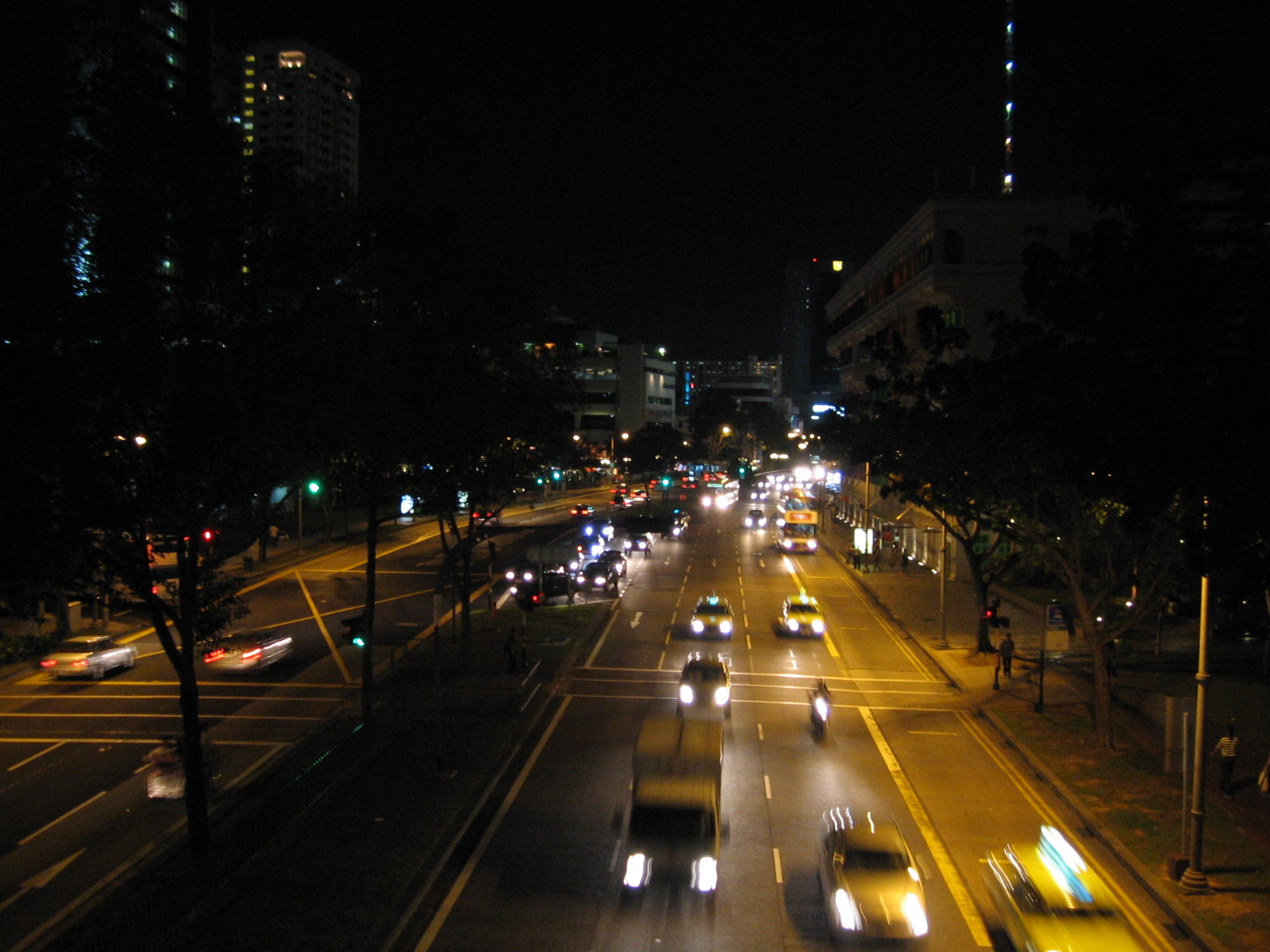
- Hill Street at night
- Interactive map of Hill Street, Singapore
- Owner: Land Transport Authority
- Location: Downtown Core, Singapore
- Coordinates: 1.2924°N 103.849°E

Hill Street (Chinese: 禧街;

Malay: Jalan Bukit) is a major road in the Downtown Core of Singapore, starting from Eu Tong Sen Street and ending at Stamford Road, where the road becomes Victoria Street. The road starts after Coleman Bridge and at the junction of River Valley Road, North Boat Quay, Eu Tong Sen Street and New Bridge Road.

Hill Street is home to several landmarks including the Armenian Church, Central Fire Station, Old Hill Street Police Station and the Singapore Chinese Chamber of Commerce. The Old Hill Street Police Station is now home to the Ministry of Information, Communications and the Arts.

Hill Street was formerly home to a hawker centre which was built in 1984, and government offices until the building was demolished in 2002.
