= Old Hill Street Police Station =

Historical police station in Singapore

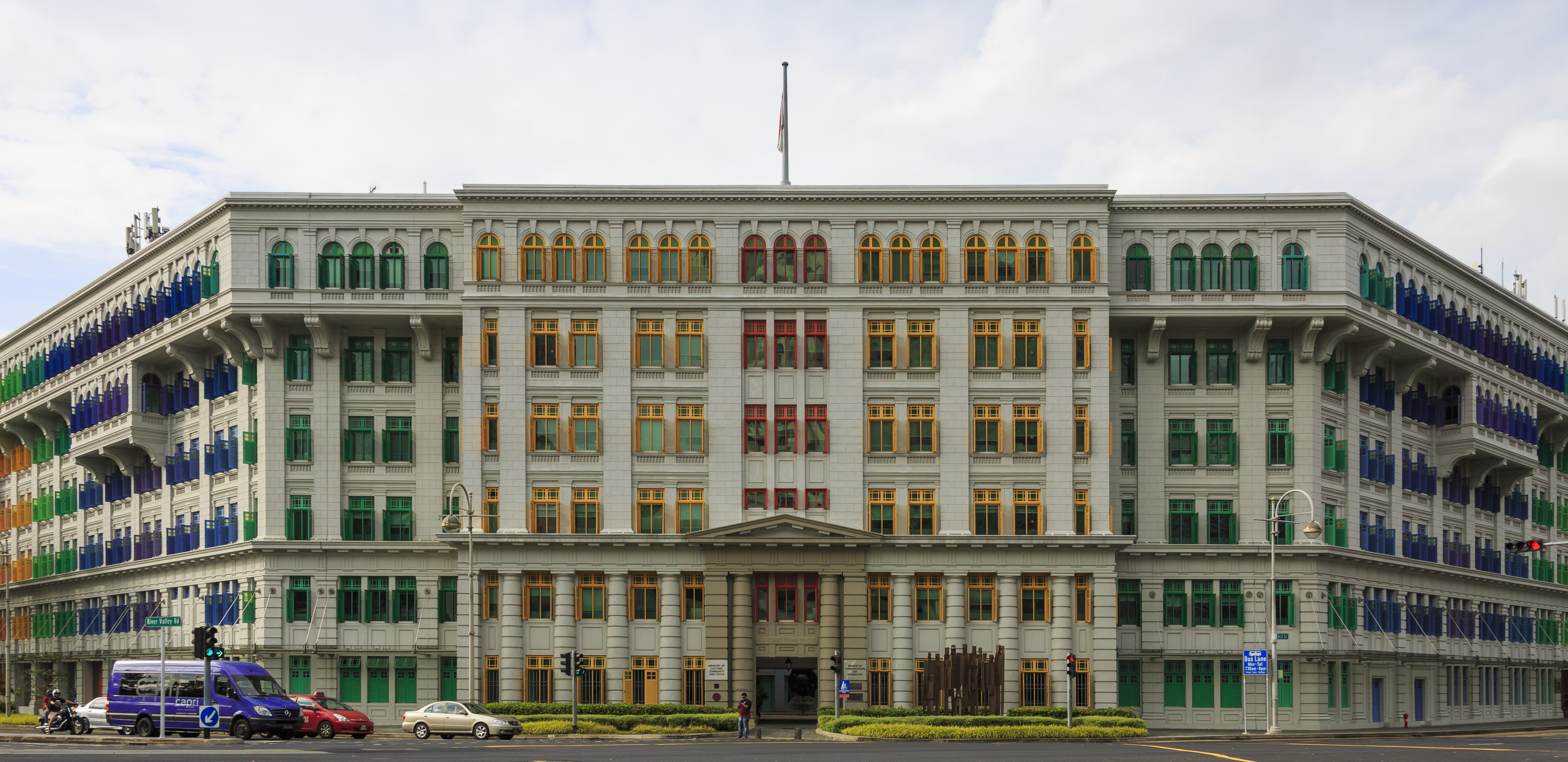
- Interactive map of the Old Hill Street Police Station area

General information
- Type: National monument, Government offices
- Location: 140 Hill Street, Singapore 179369
- Coordinates: 1°17′26.61″N 103°50′53.31″E
- Completed: 1934
- Owner: Singapore Government

Technical details
- Floor count: 6

National monument of Singapore
- Designated: 18 December 1998; 27 years ago
- Reference no.: 39

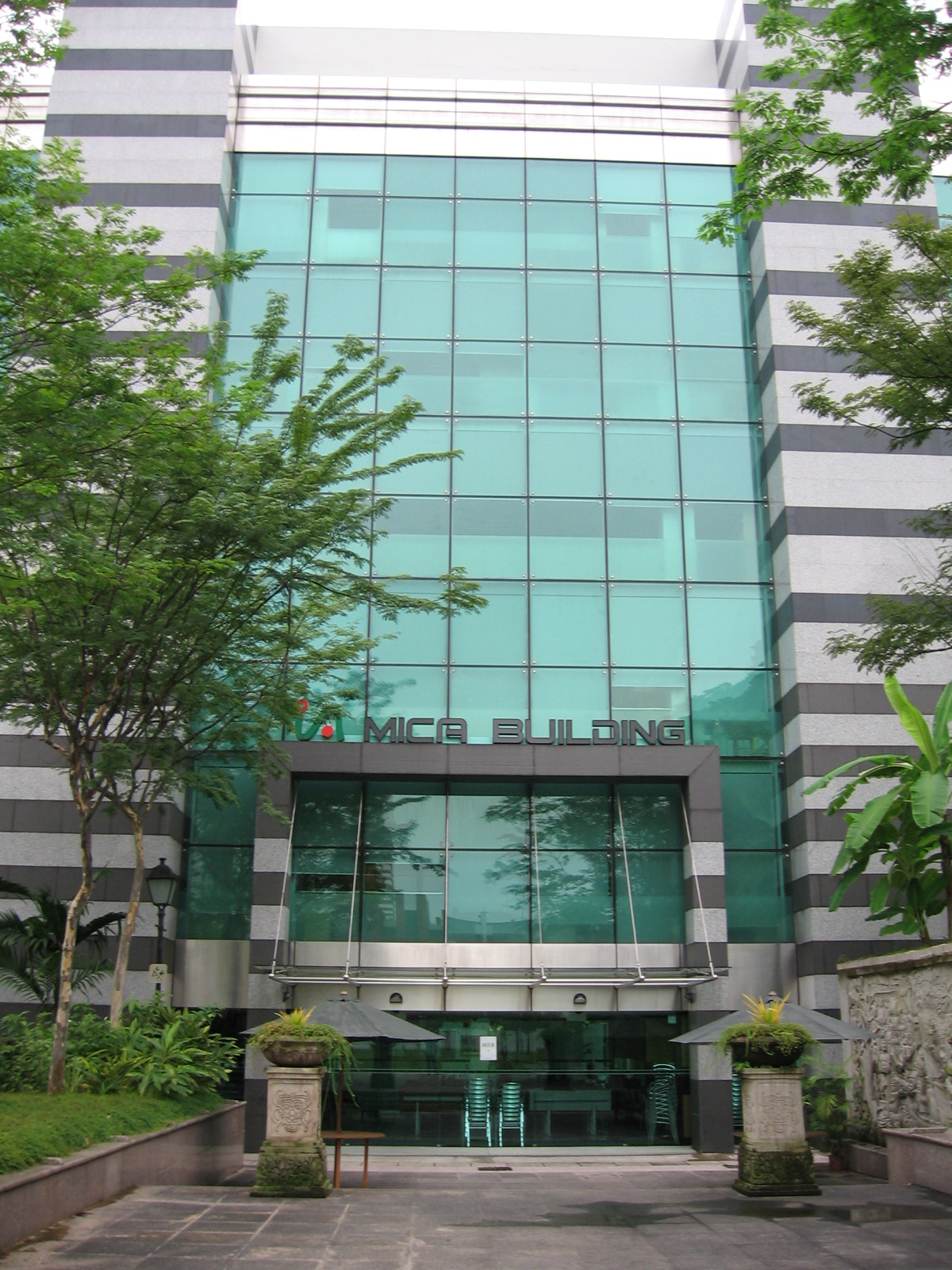
Additions and alterations were carried out on the Old Hill Street Police Station for the building to house MICA, while preserving the building's exterior facade.

The Old Hill Street Police Station is a historic building and former police station of the Singapore Police Force located at Hill Street within the Downtown Core in the Central Area of Singapore.

Also known as Balai Polis Hill Street Lama and (Chinese: 旧禧街警察局) in Malay and Chinese respectively, the name was changed from Old Hill Street Police Station to "MITA Building" in 1999, followed by "MICA Building" in 2004. After the change of ministries in November 2012, the name "MICA Building" was reverted to "Old Hill Street Police Station".

The building has a total of 927 windows and they are painted in the colours of the rainbow. The coloured windows on the first four stories have the same vibrant intensity, while the upper windows gradually intensify to accentuate the cantilevered balconies which are interesting architectural features of this historical building.

== See also ==
- Singapore Police Force
- Ministry of Communications and Information
