= Ubi MRT station =

Mass Rapid Transit station in Singapore

Ubi DT27 乌美 உபி
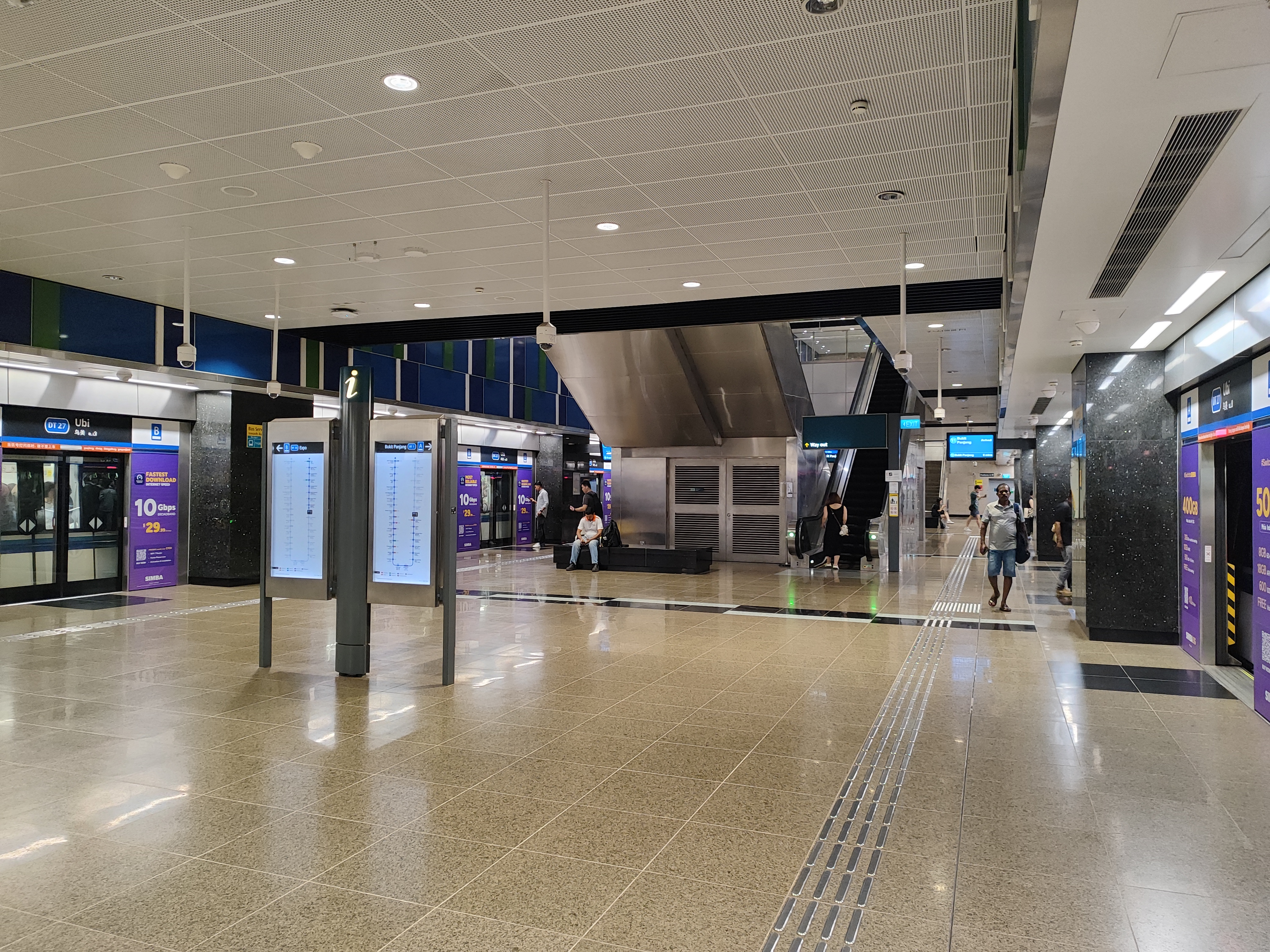
- Platform level of Ubi station

General information
- Location: 51 Ubi Avenue 2, Singapore 408899
- Coordinates: 01°19′48″N 103°54′00″E
- System: Mass Rapid Transit (MRT) station
- Owner: Land Transport Authority
- Operator: SBS Transit
- Line: Downtown Line
- Platforms: 2 (1 island platform)
- Tracks: 2
- Connections: Bus, Taxi

Construction
- Structure type: Underground
- Platform levels: 1
- Accessible: Yes

Other information
- Station code: UBI

History
- Opened: 21 October 2017; 9 years ago
- Former names: Kampong Ubi

Passengers
- June 2024: 8,451 per day

Services
Preceding station	Mass Rapid Transit	Following station
MacPherson towards Bukit Panjang	Downtown Line	Kaki Bukit towards Expo
Track layout
Location
- Location within Singapore Rail

Ubi MRT station (IPA: /ˈuːbi/ OO-bee) is an underground Mass Rapid Transit (MRT) station on the Downtown Line (DTL). Located in Geylang planning area, Singapore, the station is near the junction of Ubi Avenue 1 and Ubi Avenue 2. The station serves mainly industrial workers, and residents, in and around the Kampong Ubi estate. The word Ubi refers to ”tapioca” in Malay.

It also provides easier access to two schools, Maha Bodhi School and Manjusri Secondary School. By 2022, the station will also serve the upcoming Ubi Grove neighbourhood. It's the station with the shortest name.

== History ==
The station was first announced on 20 August 2010 when the 16 stations of the 21-kilometre (13-mile) Downtown Line Stage 3 (DTL3) from the River Valley (now Fort Canning) to Expo stations were unveiled. The line was expected to be completed in 2017. Contract 930 for the construction of Ubi station and associated tunnels was awarded to SK Engineering & Construction Co. Ltd at a sum of S$161.71 million (US$128.57 million) in April 2011. Construction of the station and the tunnels was scheduled to commence in the second quarter of this year and was targeted to be completed in 2017.

The station opened on 21 October 2017, as announced by the Land Transport Authority on 31 May 2017.
