= James Cook University Singapore =

University campus in Singapore

JCU Singapore
- Coat of arms
- Motto: Latin: Crescente Luce
- Motto in English: "Light ever increasing"
- Type: Branch campus
- Established: 1961 (Australia); 2003 (Singapore)
- Parent institution: James Cook University
- Accreditation: TEQSA
- Affiliations: Innovative Research Universities (IRU)
- Chancellor: Ngiare Brown
- Vice-Chancellor: Simon Biggs
- Dean: K Thirumaran (acting)
- Deputy Vice-Chancellor: Carole-Anne Upton
- Students: c. 4200 (2019)
- Location: 149 Sims Drive, Singapore; 1°18′56″N 103°52′34″E
- Campus: 2.4 hectares (5.9 acres); Urban park
- Named after: James Cook
- Colors: Blue Gold
- Mascot: Koalion
- Website: jcu.edu.sg

James Cook University in Singapore (JCU Singapore) is a branch campus of James Cook University, a public research university based in Australia. Established in 2003, it is currently the only overseas institution with university status in Singapore. It is located between Kallang and Geylang in the Central Region on the former site of the Manjusri Secondary School.

== History ==
JCU Singapore is a branch campus of James Cook University, which has its main Australian campus in Townsville, Queensland. It was established in 2003 as the James Cook Institute of Higher Learning before receiving Singaporean university status in 2016. Its courses are provided directly by the university and follow the same curriculum as they do in Australia. It has seen enrolments rise as more students elect to acquire an Australian qualification in Singapore.

Students studying at JCU Singapore can also transfer to JCU Australia and vice versa or participate in the Intercampus Exchange Program for up to 2 semesters of the course while still paying tuition to JCU Singapore. Students at JCU Australia and other universities can also apply to study abroad at JCU Singapore.

In 2015, the campus shifted to the site of the former Manjusri Secondary School located between Kallang and Geylang. The new site is larger than the previous campus at 2.4 hectares (5.9 acres).

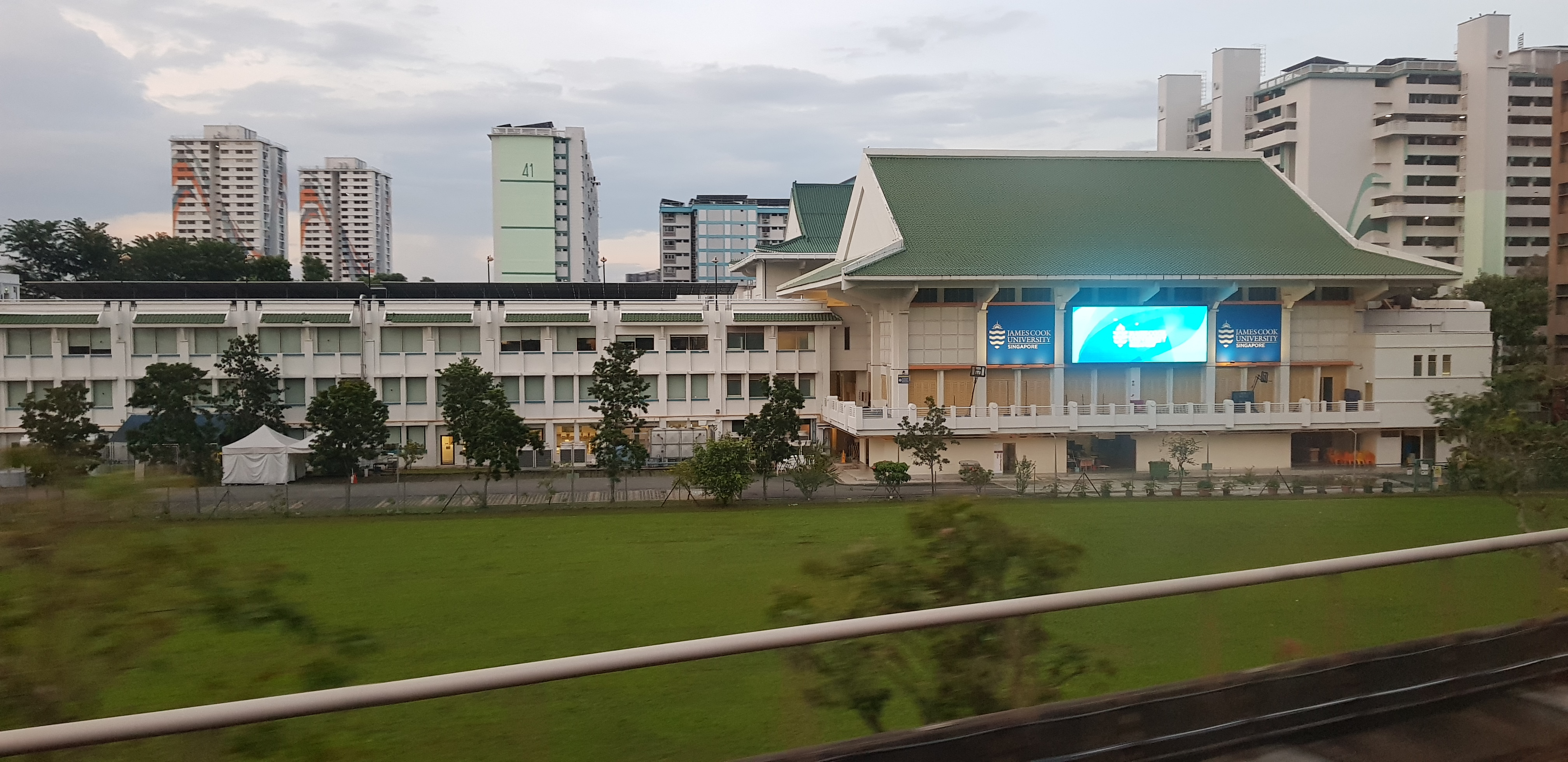
The current Campus of James Cook University, Singapore in December 2024

In May 2016, the Singaporean and Australian governments concluded a review of the Singapore-Australia Free Trade Agreement, which added several measures to promote further cooperation on education. As part of this agreement, JCU Singapore was awarded university status and permitted to brand itself as the Singaporean branch campus of James Cook University in July 2016. It had previously been known as the James Cook Institute of Higher Learning.

== Academic profile ==
=== Psychology clinic ===
James Cook University runs a psychology clinic from its Singapore campus which is open to members of the public. The facility allows students studying at a master's level to gain practical experience under the supervision of qualified clinical psychologists and offers counselling services to the public at a reduced cost.

University rankings

Global – Overall
- ARWU World: 301-400 (2023)
- QS World: 445 (2025)
- THE World: 301-500 (2025)
- USNWR Global: 412 (2024/25)

=== Academic reputation ===
In the 2023 Academic Ranking of World Universities, the university attained a position of #301-400. In the 2025 Times Higher Education World University Rankings, the university attained a position of #301-500. In the 2025 QS World University Rankings (published 2024), the university tied 445th place. In the 2024-2025 U.S. News & World Report Best Global Universities rankings, the university attained 412th place. In the 2023 Aggregate Ranking of Top Universities, which measures aggregate performance across the QS, Times and ARWU rankings, the university attained a position of 317th place.

=== Admissions ===
JCU Singapore programs have academic entry requirements that vary based on the level and field of studies. It also offers pathway programs that provide entry into programs.

==== Undergraduate ====
For undergraduate courses, JCU Singapore's academic entry requirement is a high school certificate at level 12 or equivalent or a diploma from a polytechnic or other recognised institution. Students are also required to have attained JCU Singapore's English language pre-requisite. Students not meeting the entry requirements can also enrol in pathway programs.

==== Postgraduate ====
For postgraduate courses, JCU Singapore's academic entry requirement is usually a bachelor's degree or equivalent. Doctoral program applicants are also required to have a Bachelor Honours or other post-graduate qualification.

=== Graduate outcomes ===
According to the Private Education Institution Graduate Employment Survey 2022/2023 conducted by the Committee for Private Education on employment outcomes, graduates of JCU Singapore achieved a 78.8% employment rate of which 50.5% was full-time employment. The response rate to the survey was 21.7%.

=== Academic calendar ===
The university runs on a trimester system, allowing students to complete their studies in a shorter period of time. A majority of student intakes occur during March (SP51), July (SP52) and November (SP53).

== Notable people ==
Notable alumni of James Cook University's Singapore campus include:

- Fong Kay Yian - Singaporean springboard diver
- Nguyễn Huỳnh Kim Duyên - Vietnamese model and beauty pageant titleholder

The Deputy Vice-Chancellor, Singapore is Carole-Anne Upton.

== See also ==
- List of universities in Singapore
- James Cook University
- Education in Singapore
