= Tampines West MRT station =

Mass Rapid Transit station in Singapore

Tampines West DT31 淡滨尼西 தெம்பினிஸ் வெஸ்ட்
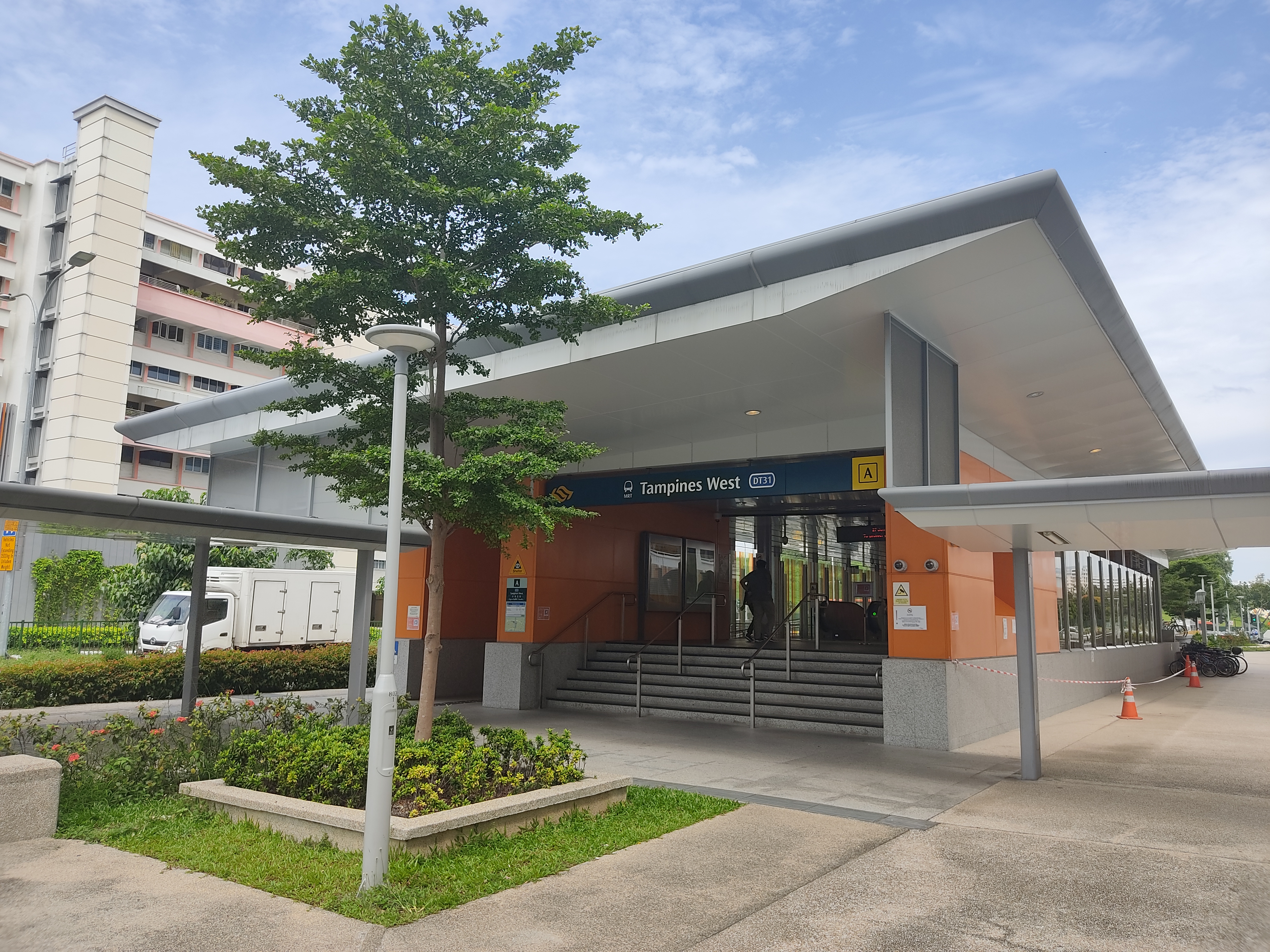
- Exit A of Tampines West station

General information
- Location: 2 Tampines Avenue 4, Singapore 529683
- Coordinates: 01°20′44″N 103°56′18″E
- System: Mass Rapid Transit (MRT) station
- Owner: Land Transport Authority
- Operator: SBS Transit
- Line: Downtown Line
- Platforms: 2 (1 island platform)
- Tracks: 2
- Connections: Bus, Taxi

Construction
- Structure type: Underground
- Platform levels: 1
- Accessible: Yes

Other information
- Station code: TPW

History
- Opened: 21 October 2017; 9 years ago
- Former names: Tampines Avenue 1 and Tampines South

Passengers
- June 2024: 7,831 per day

Services
Preceding station	Mass Rapid Transit	Following station
Bedok Reservoir towards Bukit Panjang	Downtown Line	Tampines towards Expo
Track layout
Location
- Location within Singapore Rail

Tampines West MRT station is an underground Mass Rapid Transit station on the Downtown Line in Tampines, Singapore. It is located at Tampines Avenue 4, near the junction with Tampines Avenue 1.

The station is located near some schools such as Temasek Polytechnic, Junyuan Primary School and East View Primary School, as well as SAFRA Tampines, and to the housing estates of Tampines Palmspring and Tampines Polyview.

== History ==
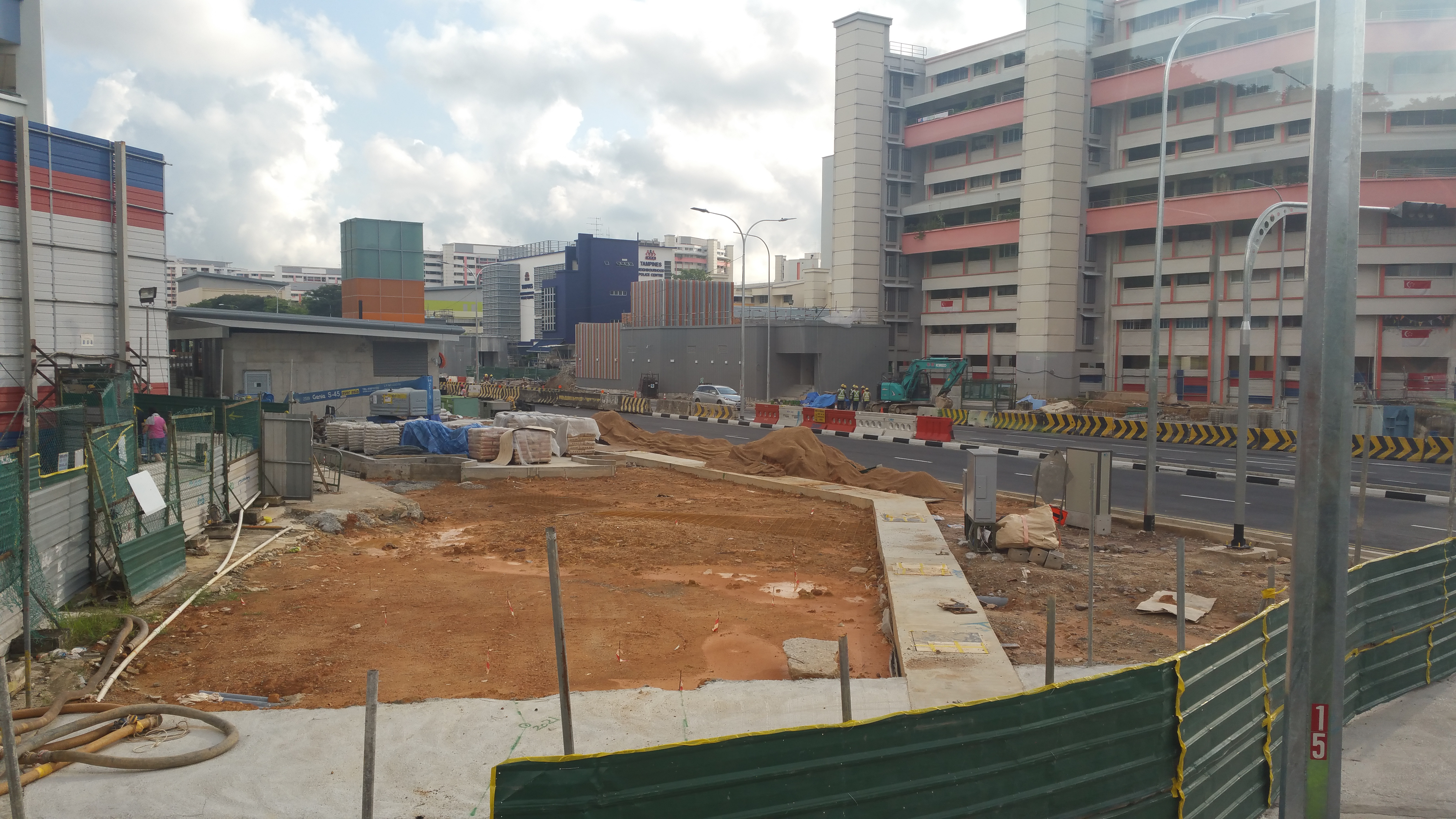
Tampines West station under construction.

Contract 926 for the design and construction of Tampines West MRT Station and associated tunnels was awarded to Cooperativa Muratori & Cementisti - C.M.C di Ravenna at an estimated sum of S$226.92 million in July 2011. On 29 January 2012, the signage of Tampines Palmspring was demolished. Construction of the station started in February that year, with the noise barriers placed. Road realignment has begun that June and lasted till January 2016.

The station opened on 21 October 2017, as announced by the Land Transport Authority on 31 May that year.

As part of Operation Quicksand, a simulated terror attack on 27 January 2019 was carried out at this station.
