= Bedok North MRT station =

Mass Rapid Transit station in Singapore

Bedok North DT29 勿洛北 பிடோக் நார்த்
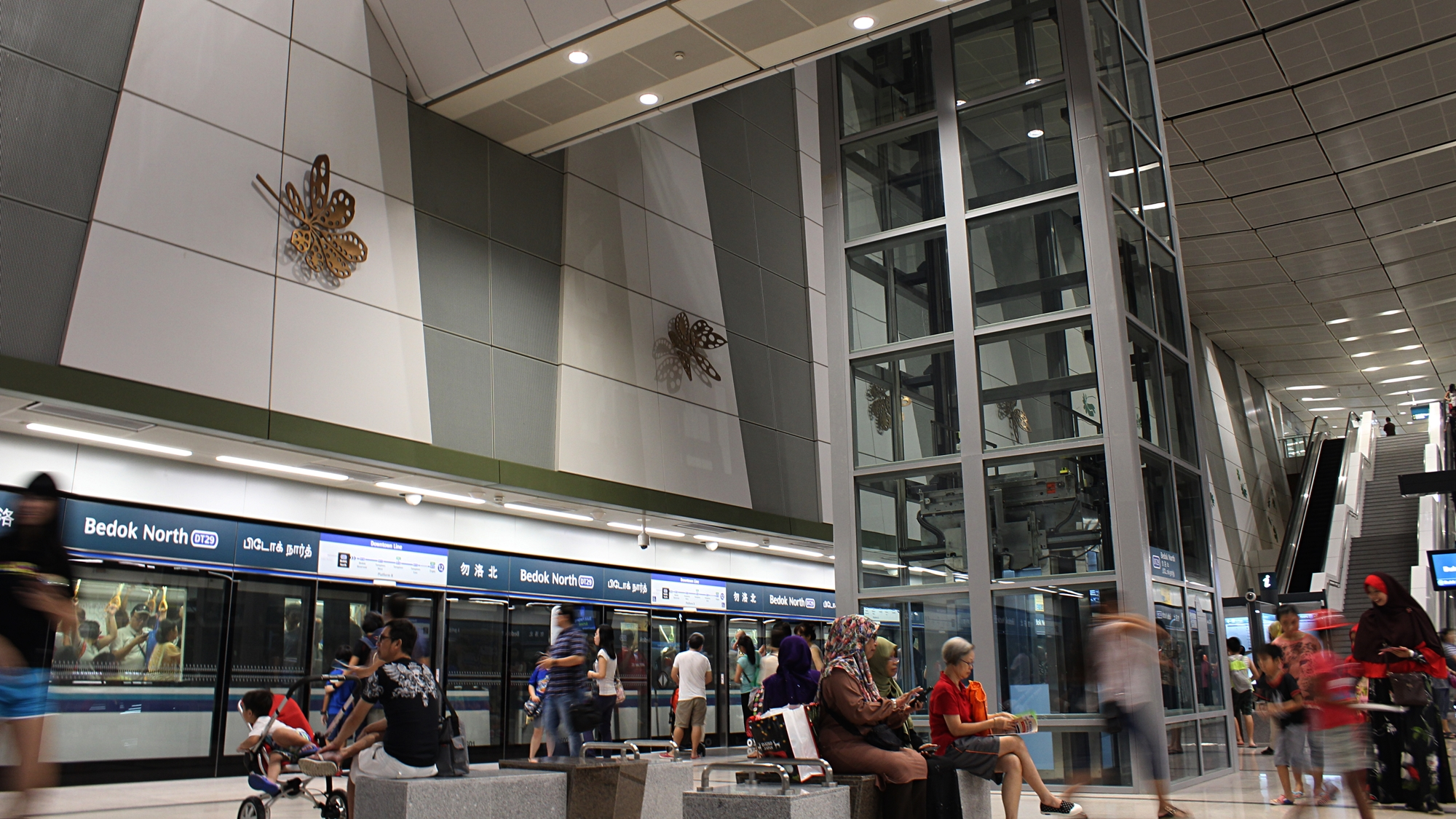
- Platform level of Bedok North station

General information
- Location: 651 Bedok North Road, Singapore 479481
- Coordinates: 01°20′11″N 103°55′04″E
- System: Mass Rapid Transit (MRT) station
- Owner: Land Transport Authority
- Operator: SBS Transit
- Line: Downtown Line
- Platforms: 2 (1 island platform)
- Tracks: 2
- Connections: Bus, Taxi

Construction
- Structure type: Underground
- Platform levels: 1
- Accessible: Yes

Other information
- Station code: BDN

History
- Opened: 21 October 2017; 9 years ago
- Former names: Bedok Town Park

Passengers
- June 2024: 7,032 per day

Services
Preceding station	Mass Rapid Transit	Following station
Kaki Bukit towards Bukit Panjang	Downtown Line	Bedok Reservoir towards Expo
Track layout
Location
- Location within Singapore Rail

Bedok North MRT station is an underground Mass Rapid Transit station on the Downtown Line in the northern part of Bedok, Singapore, located along Bedok North Road, near the Pan Island Expressway flyover and the Bedok Town Park. It serves nearby HDB estates, the nearby Damai Primary School and will serve a future integrated hospital in the area.

== History ==
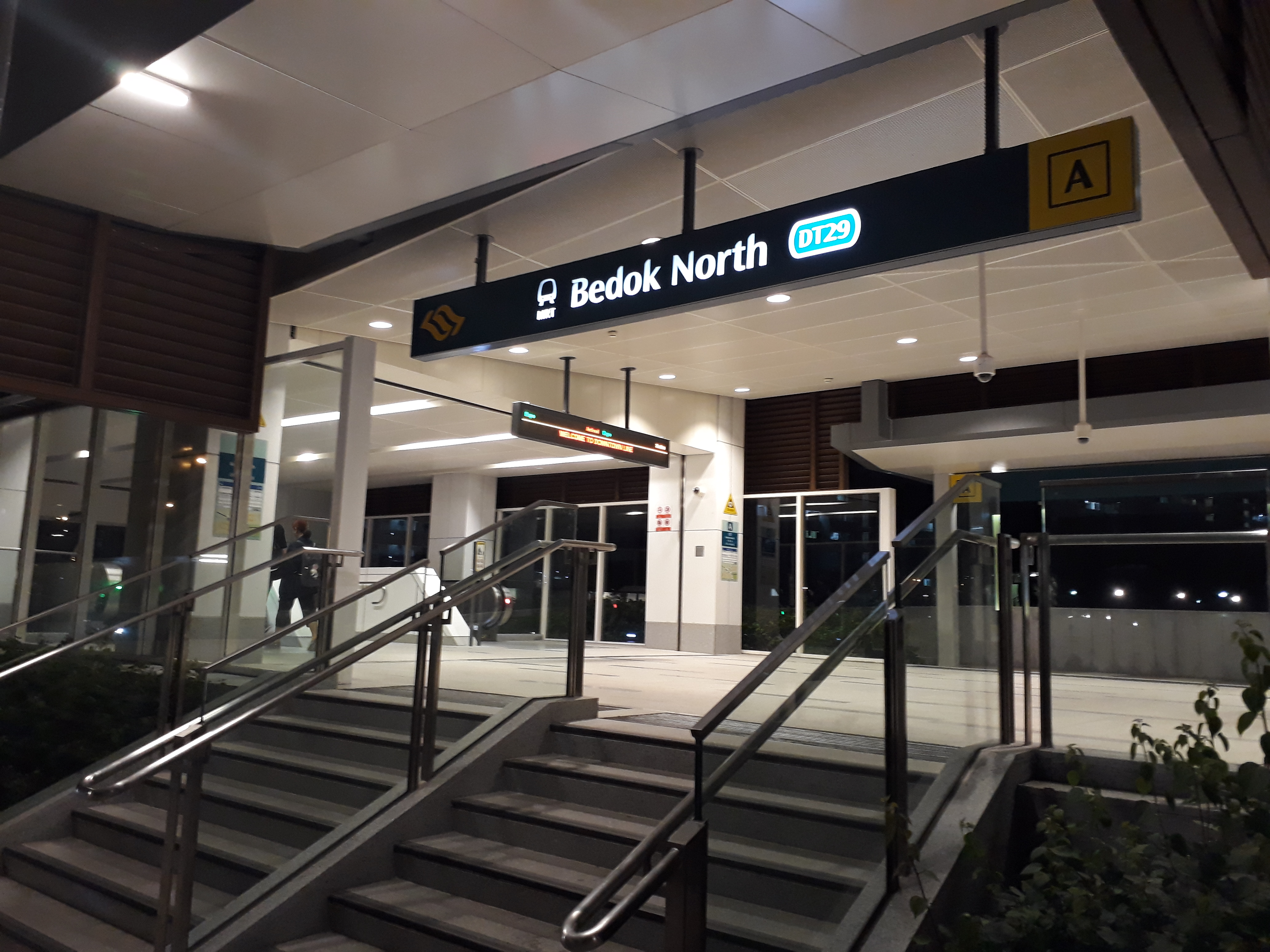
Exit A of Bedok North MRT station.

The station was first announced as Bedok Town Park station on 20 August 2010 when the 16 stations of the 21-kilometre (13-mile) Downtown Line Stage 3 (DTL3) from the River Valley (now Fort Canning) to Expo stations were unveiled. The line was expected to be completed in 2017. Contract 928 for the construction and completion of Bedok Town Park station and associated tunnels was awarded to Sato Kogyo (S) Pte Ltd at a sum of S$268.68 million (US$213.62 million) in February 2011. Construction of the station and the tunnels commenced in the second quarter that year and was targeted to be completed in 2017.

On 31 May 2017, the Land Transport Authority (LTA) announced that the station, together with the rest of DTL3, will be opened on 21 October that year. Passengers were offered a preview of the station along with the other Downtown Line 3 (DTL 3) stations at the DTL 3 Open House on 15 October.

== Station details ==
Bedok North MRT station serves the Downtown Line and is located between Bedok Reservoir and Kaki Bukit stations. The station code is DT29. The station is located along Bedok North Road. The station has 3 entrances serving surrounding HDB estates, Damai Primary School and a future integrated hospital. Bedok North Station is also a Civil Defence (CD) shelter.

Like other MRT stations in Singapore, the station is wheelchair accessible and has lifts at every entrance and from the concourse to the platform. Tactile flooring is also installed around the station to guide visually-handicapped.

=== Public artwork ===
As part of the Art-in-Transit programme in MRT, an artwork named Dedaun Masa (Leaves of Time) by Ahmad Abu Bakar is featured around the station. The artwork shows leaves inspired by Umbrella trees and leaves found around the Bedok North area.
