= Bedok Reservoir MRT station =

Mass Rapid Transit station in Singapore

Bedok Reservoir DT30 勿洛蓄水池 பிடோக் ரெசவோர்
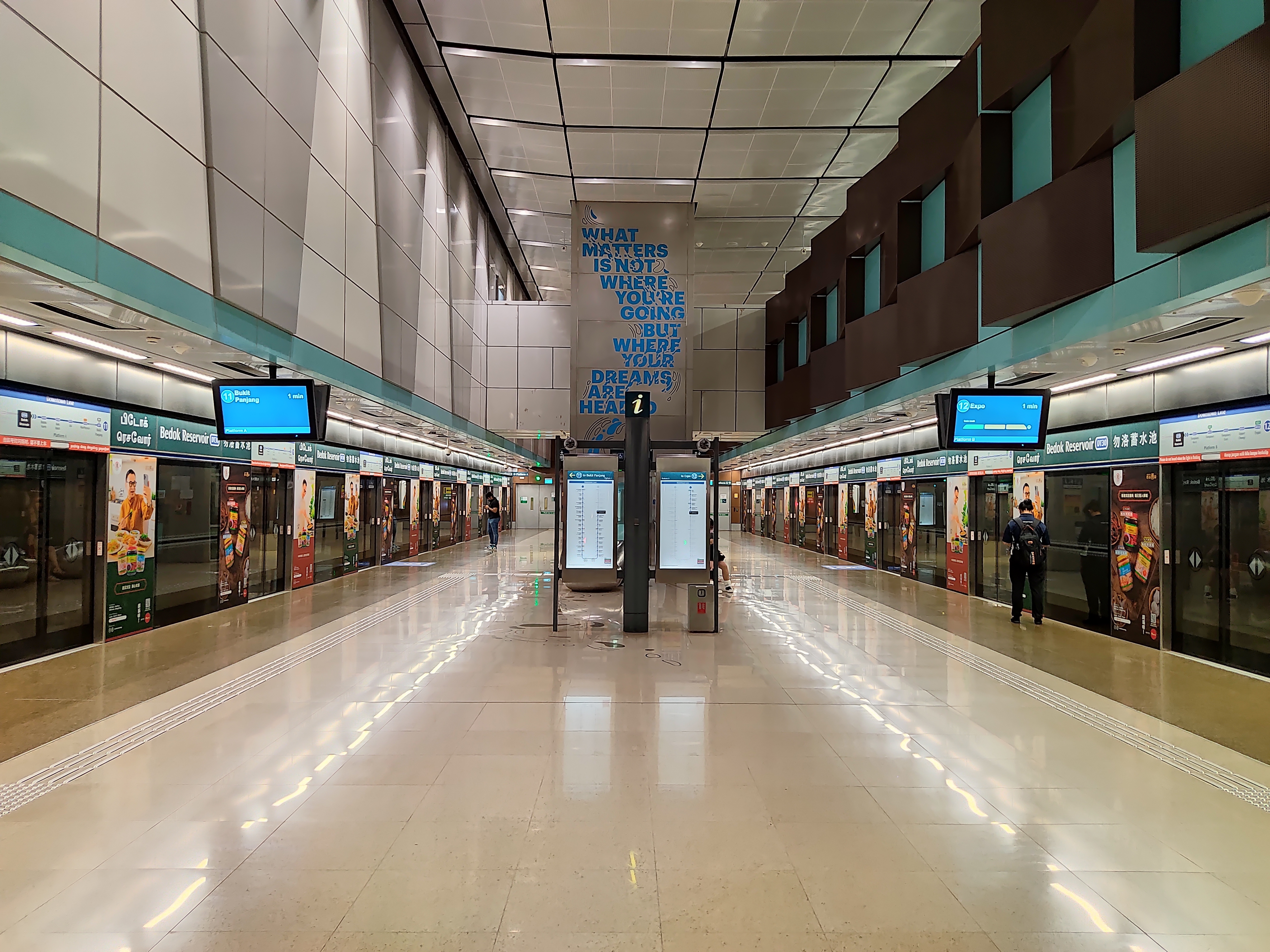
- Platform level of Bedok Reservoir station

General information
- Location: 371 Bedok North Avenue 3, Singapore 469724
- Coordinates: 01°20′11″N 103°55′59″E
- System: Mass Rapid Transit (MRT) station
- Owner: Land Transport Authority
- Operator: SBS Transit
- Line: Downtown Line
- Platforms: 2 (1 island platform)
- Tracks: 2
- Connections: Bus, Taxi

Construction
- Structure type: Underground
- Platform levels: 1
- Accessible: Yes

Other information
- Station code: BDR

History
- Opened: 21 October 2017; 9 years ago

Passengers
- June 2024: 7,566 per day

Services
Preceding station	Mass Rapid Transit	Following station
Bedok North towards Bukit Panjang	Downtown Line	Tampines West towards Expo
Track layout
Location
- Location within Singapore Rail

Bedok Reservoir MRT station is an underground Mass Rapid Transit station on the Downtown Line (DTL) in Bedok, Singapore. Located at Bedok Reservoir Road beside Bedok North Avenue 3, it serves residents living near Bedok Reservoir and the students of Bedok Green Secondary School, Yu Neng Primary School, Fengshan Primary School and Red Swastika School.

The station was announced in August 2010 when the DTL Stage 3 stations were revealed. The station opened on 21 October 2017. Designed by Ong & Ong, Bedok Reservoir station features a public artwork, Somewhere Else by Ng Chee Yong.

== History ==
The station was announced on 20 August 2010 along with the 16 stations of the 21-kilometre (13-mile) Downtown Line Stage 3 (DTL3) from the River Valley (now Fort Canning) to Expo stations. The line segment was expected to be completed in 2017. The contract for the construction of Bedok Reservoir station was awarded to Cooperativa Muratori & Cementisti – C.M.C di Ravenna for S$196.46 million (US$156.2 million) in July 2011. Construction of the station and the tunnels commenced in July that year and was targeted to be completed in 2017. The station's construction involved the temporarily diversion of an existing canal for the implementation of the diaphragm wall. The canal was restored upon the completion of the station box.

On 31 May 2017, the Land Transport Authority (LTA) announced that the station would be opened on 21 October that year. Passengers were offered a preview of the station along with the other DTL3 stations at the DTL3 Open House on 15 October.

== Details ==
Bedok Reservoir station serves the DTL and is between the Bedok North and Tampines West stations. The official station code is DT30. Being part of the DTL, the station is operated by SBS Transit. The station has two entrances and serves Bedok Reservoir Park. Surrounding the station are multiple schools including Damai Secondary School, Yu Neng Primary School, Bedok Green Secondary School and Red Swastika School.

Designed by Ong&Ong, the station design incorporated palettes and sculpture-inspired designs as part of the "Station in the Park" concept. The station is wheelchair-accessible. A tactile system, consisting of tiles with rounded or elongated raised studs, guides visually impaired commuters through the station, with dedicated routes that connect the station entrances to the platforms or between the lines. Wider fare gates allow easier access for wheelchair users into the station.

The station features Somewhere Else by Ng Chee Yong as part of the MRT network's Art-in-Transit programme, a public art showcase which integrates artworks into the MRT network. Alluding to the namesake reservoir, the artwork intends to depict the relationship between water flow and human traffic in the station. Besides a stylized bench, the artwork features a message on the lift shaft: "What matters is not where you're going but where your dreams are headed" cast in light blue, which, according to writer Justin Zhuang, "dribbles down" the shaft in motifs of droplets that "flow" on the platform to the exit. The message was a phrase that Ng hoped to remind commuters how far they are from their dreams.

The artist initially proposed an illustration of the water cycle, with motifs of water droplets and streaks plastered around the station to reflect passenger flow. Neither the artist nor the Art Review Panel liked the idea, so Art in Transit curator Hanson Ho suggested using typography, using Ng's experience in design work for various companies. The message on the lift shaft was in a typeface Ng adapted to reflect the concept of flow, with the motifs of droplets embedded on the platform floor in granite and steel. Ng also worked with the station's architect to design the stylised bench which combines three types of seats – a stool, a chair with a backrest and a group bench. This resulted in the bench having an organic shape resembling giant water droplets.
