= Kaki Bukit MRT station =

Mass Rapid Transit station in Singapore

Kaki Bukit DT28 加基武吉 காக்கி புக்கிட்
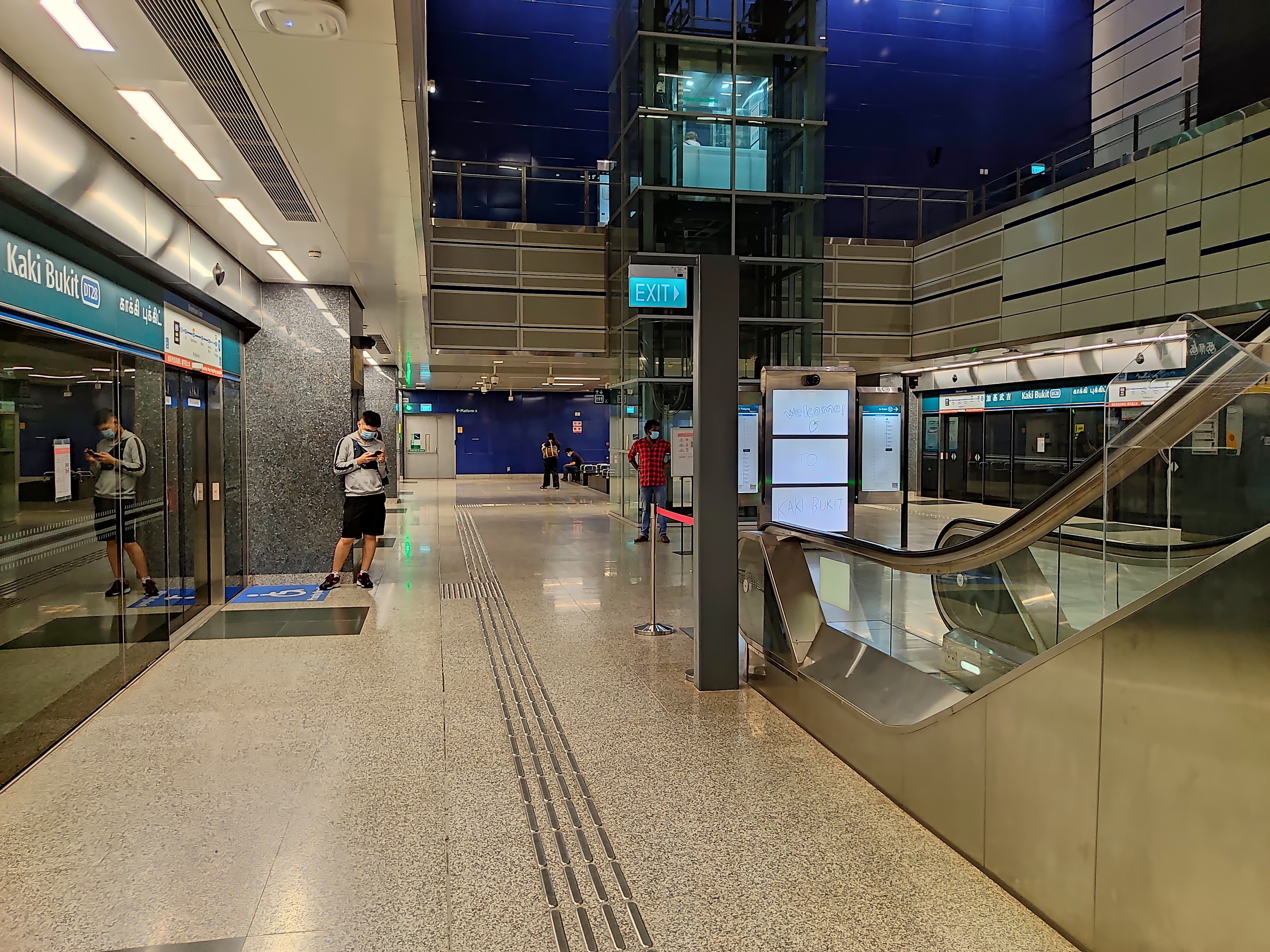
- Platform level of Kaki Bukit station, with the art-in-transit displayed.

General information
- Location: 30 Kaki Bukit Avenue 1, Singapore 415804
- Coordinates: 01°20′06″N 103°54′32″E
- System: Mass Rapid Transit (MRT) station
- Owner: Land Transport Authority
- Operator: SBS Transit
- Line: Downtown Line
- Platforms: 2 (1 island platform)
- Tracks: 2
- Connections: Bus, Taxi

Construction
- Structure type: Underground
- Platform levels: 1
- Accessible: Yes

Other information
- Station code: KKB

History
- Opened: 21 October 2017; 9 years ago

Passengers
- June 2024: 10,409 per day

Services
Preceding station	Mass Rapid Transit	Following station
Ubi towards Bukit Panjang	Downtown Line	Bedok North towards Expo
Track layout
Location
- Location within Singapore Rail

Kaki Bukit MRT station is an underground Mass Rapid Transit (MRT) station on the Downtown Line (DTL). Situated in Kaki Bukit, Singapore, it is located along Kaki Bukit Avenue 1. The station serves the vicinity's residential and industrial developments, including Kaki Bukit Techpark and TechView.

The station was first announced in August 2010 when the DTL Stage 3 stations were revealed. The station opened on 21 October 2017. Designed by Ong & Ong, Kaki Bukit station features an artwork Welcome to Kaki Bukit by Hans Tan.

== History ==
The station was first announced on 20 August 2010 when the 16 stations of the 21-kilometre (13-mile) Downtown Line Stage 3 (DTL3) from the River Valley (now Fort Canning) to Expo stations were unveiled. The line segment was expected to be completed in 2017. The contract for the construction of Kaki Bukit station was awarded to China State Construction Engineering Corporation Limited for S$93.8 million (US$74.58 million) in June 2011. Construction of the station and the tunnels commenced in July that year and was targeted to be completed in 2017.

A segment of Kaki Bukit Avenue 1 from Jalan Tenaga to Jalan Damai was closed from 28 August 2011 to April 2016 to facilitate the station's construction. The Land Transport Authority (LTA) widened Jalan Tenaga and Jalan Damai to accommodate the diverted traffic. The road segment reopened on 24 April 2016.

On 31 May 2017, the LTA announced that the station, together with the rest of DTL3, would be opened on 21 October that year. Passengers were offered a preview of the station along with the other Downtown Line 3 (DTL 3) stations at the DTL 3 Open House on 15 October.

== Details ==
Station images

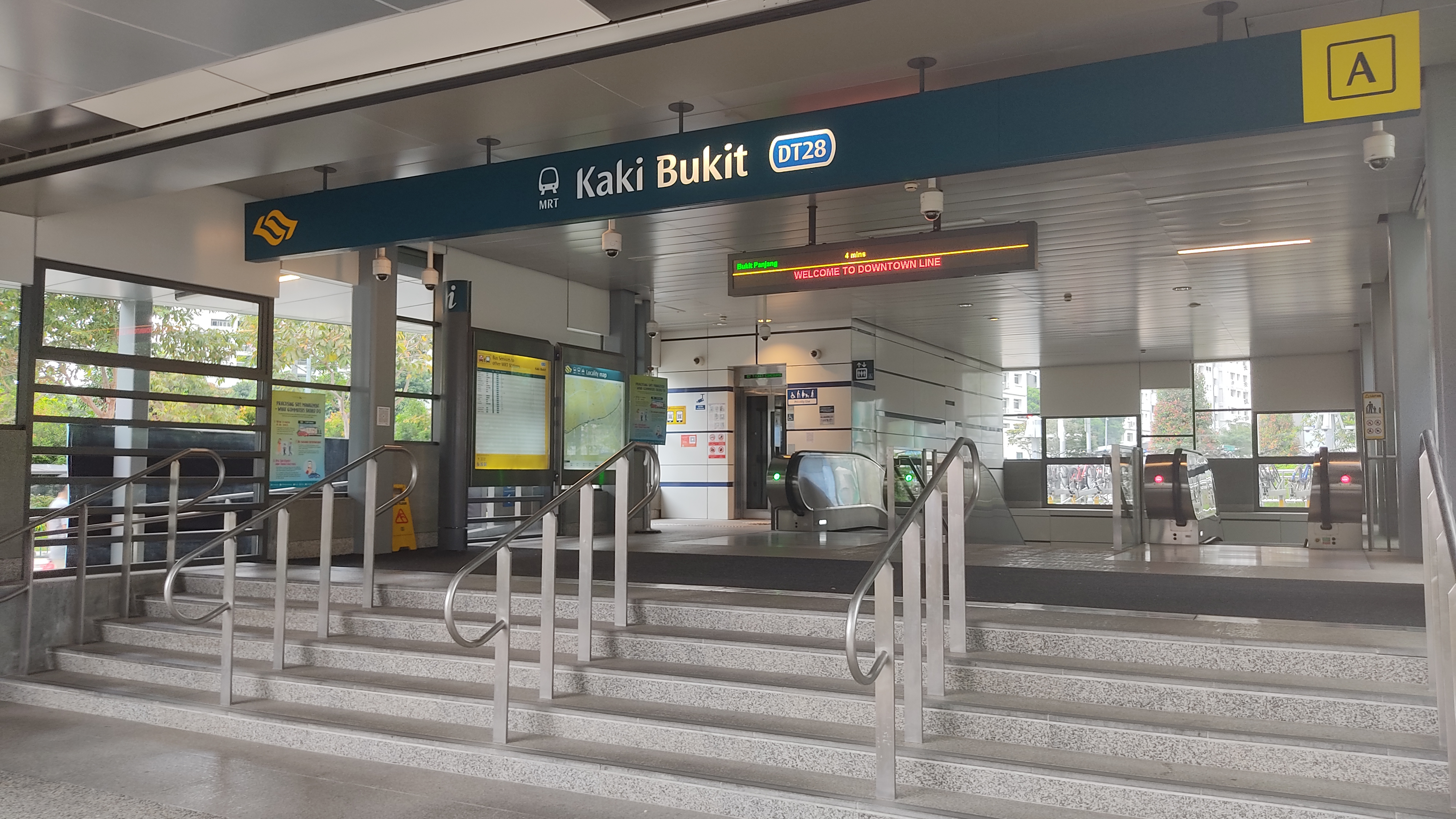
Exit A

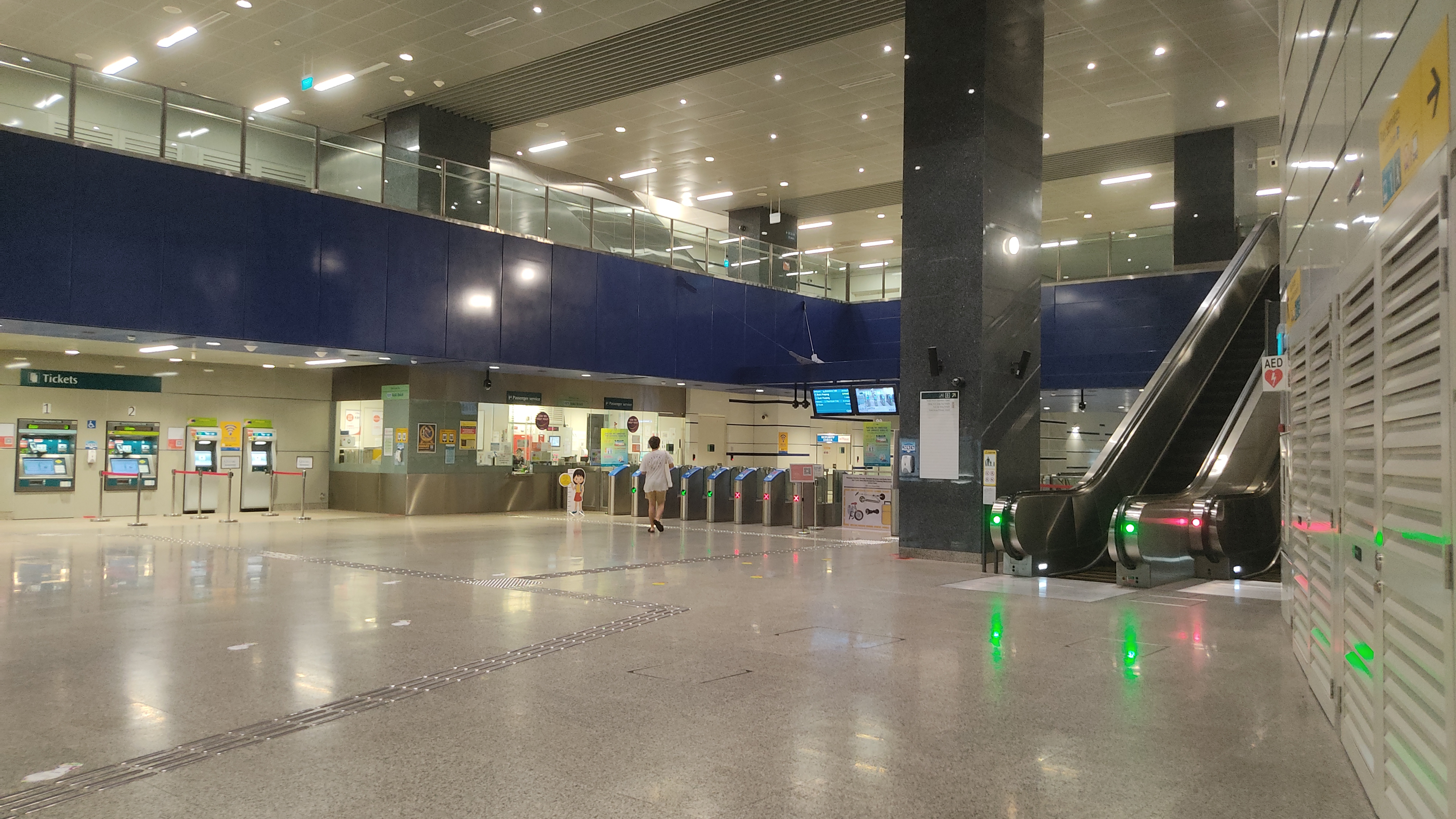
Concourse level

Kaki Bukit station serves the DTL and is between the Ubi and Bedok North stations. The official station code is DT28. Being part of the DTL, the station is operated by SBS Transit. The station is situated along Kaki Bukit Avenue 1 near the junction with Jalan Damai. Kaki Bukit station has two entrances serving the industrial developments of Kaki Bukit, including Eunos Techpark, Kaki Bukit Techpark and TechView, and public residential blocks along Bedok Reservoir Road, Jalan Damai and Jalan Tenaga.

The station has three underground levels. Designed by Ong&Ong, the station is supported by granite columns, with a link bridge connecting the two entrances. The exterior of the entrances utilises glass and aluminium panels. The station is wheelchair-accessible. A tactile system, consisting of tiles with rounded or elongated raised studs, guides visually impaired commuters through the station, with dedicated routes that connect the station entrances to the platforms or between the lines. Wider fare gates allow easier access for wheelchair users into the station.

=== Artwork ===
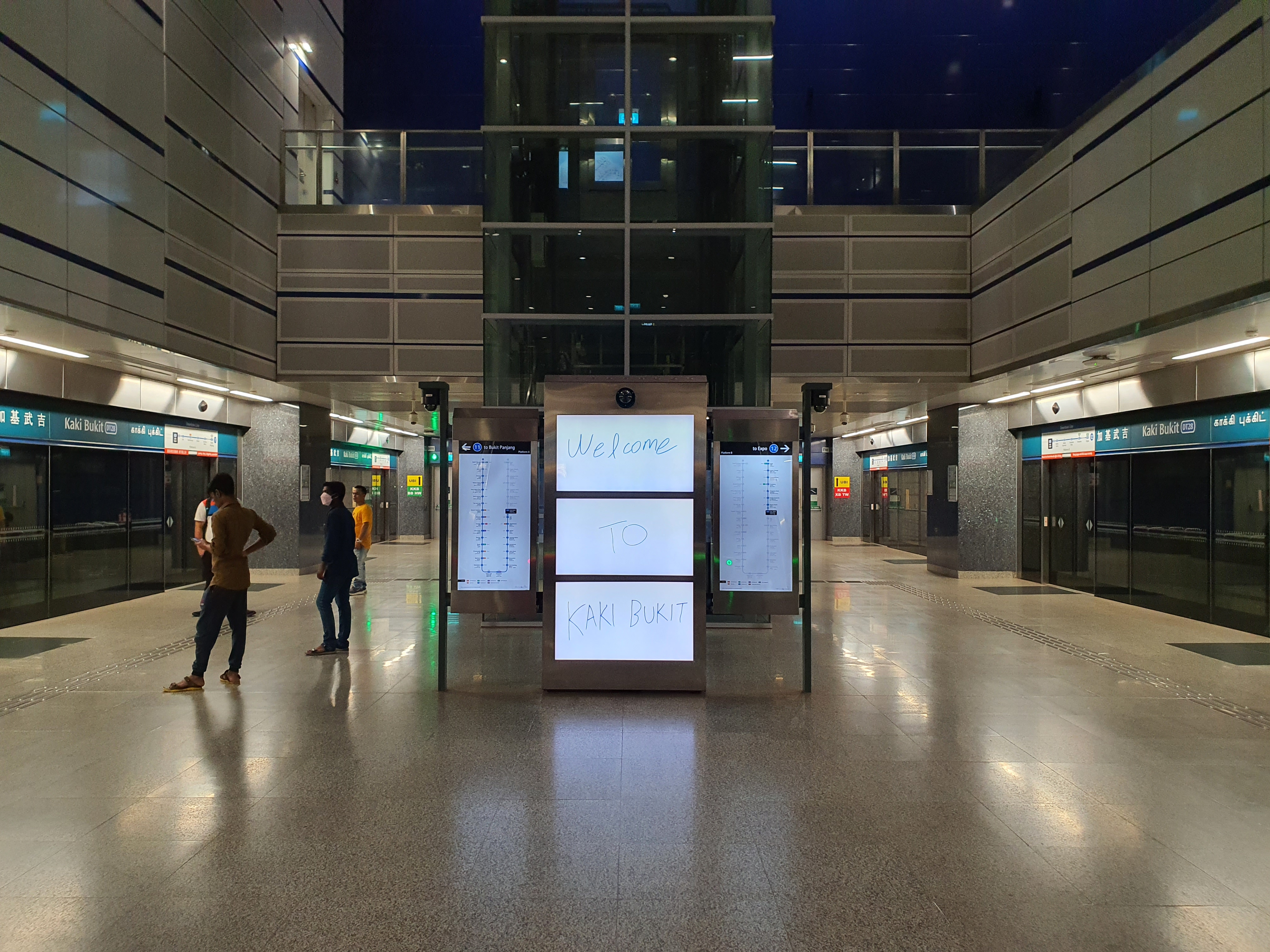
Art in Transit artwork

Welcome to Kaki Bukit by Hans Tan is displayed at this station as part of the Art-in-Transit programme, a public art showcase which integrates artworks into the MRT network. The artwork is a video installation depicting the various people of Kaki Bukit writing "Welcome to Kaki Bukit" in Singapore's four official languages – English, Malay, Mandarin, and Tamil. It intends to reflect the dual "personality" of Kaki Bukit through the involvement of workers and residents.

The artist initially had difficulty coming up with a concept for the station artwork due to Kaki Bukit's lack of rich history and its nature as an industrial area. With the station's location between the residential and industrial developments of Kaki Bukit, Tan decided the work should "bridge" the area's "split personality". The work was installed on the platform near the escalators that lead up to the concourse, with its well-ventilated enclosure integrated with information signage in the station. The greeting is split across three screens, with "Welcome" written by residents and "Kaki Bukit" written by workers, with "to" by the artist himself to symbolise how his work and the station brought the two sides together. The videos are played in random sequences that would not have all three change simultaneously.
