= Manjusri Secondary School =

Coordinates: 1.32758°N 103.90122°E

- 文殊中学; Sekolah Menengah Manjusri

Location
- 20 Ubi Avenue 1, Singapore 408940

Information
- Type: Government-aided; Co-educational
- Motto: 智行慈愿 (wisdom conduct benevolence aspiration)
- Established: 1982; 44 years ago
- Session: Single session
- School code: 7307
- Principal: Sim Chong Boon
- Enrolment: approx. 1,515
- Colour: Maroon Light Blue
- Website: www.manjusrisec.moe.edu.sg

Manjusri Secondary School (MJR) is a co-educational government-aided secondary school in Ubi, Singapore. Named after the bodhisattva Manjusri, it was established by the Singapore Buddhist Federation in 1982 and affiliated to two primary schools: Mee Toh School and Maha Bodhi School.

== School history ==
The school was set up by the Singapore Buddhist Federation in 1982 at 149 Sims Drive, Singapore 387380. In 2009, the school moved to a new campus at 20 Ubi Avenue 1 which was officially opened on 22 April 2010. The move allowed the school to share resources with its affiliated primary school, Maha Bodhi School. James Cook University Singapore currently occupies the old campus and continues to use its buildings.

The school celebrated its 30th anniversary in 2012. The annual school anniversary concert was held in April 2012 at the LASALLE College of the Arts in conjunction of the school's 30th anniversary. In November, the school organised a homecoming dinner for past-and-present staff and students, with Education Minister Heng Swee Keat being the guest-of-honour.

== Notable alumni ==
- Goh Qiu Bin: Gold medalist (Wushu), 2005 Southeast Asian Games
- Ho Wee San: Executive Director of Singapore Chinese Orchestra, Nominated Member of Parliament
- Tan Yan Ni: Bronze medalist (Wushu), 2014 Asian Games
- Ya Hui: Actress, Mediacorp
- Koh Min Hui: Musician, Singapore Chinese Orchestra
