= Bedok Reservoir =

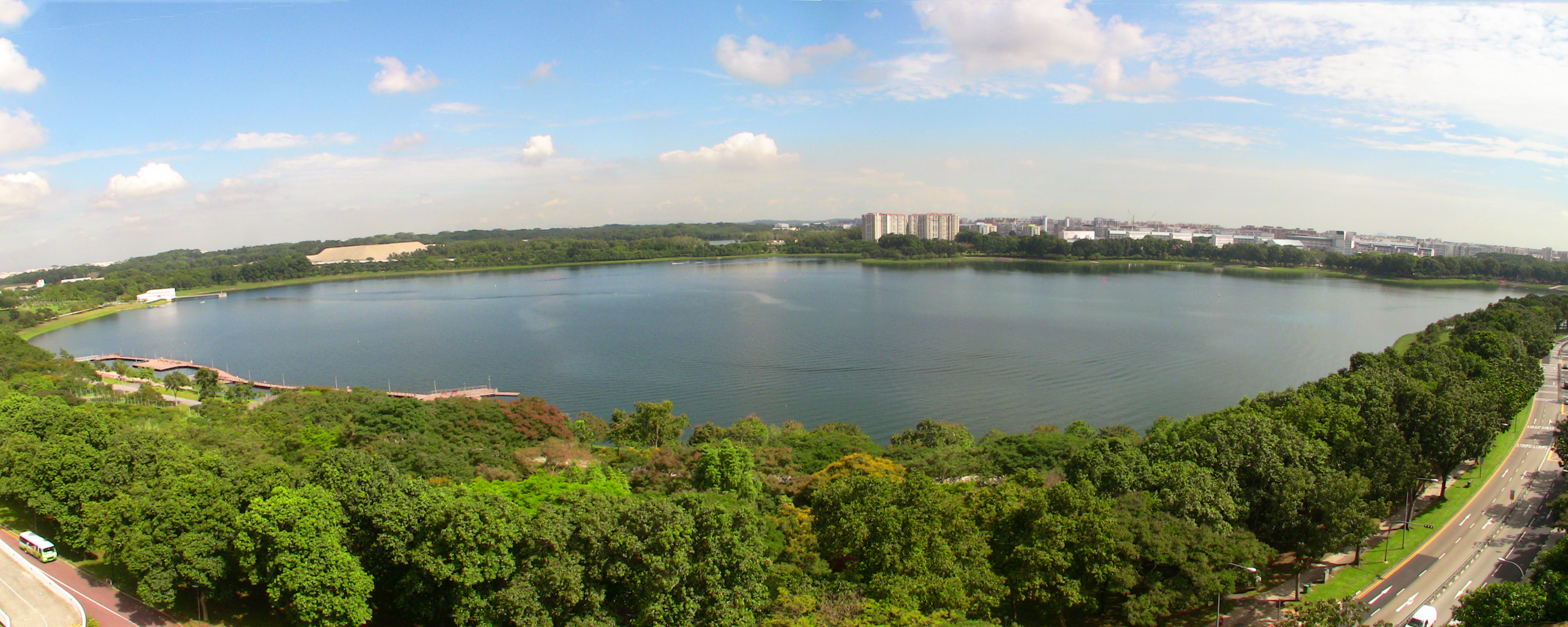

- Location within Singapore
- Location: Eastern Singapore
- Coordinates: 1°20′32″N 103°55′30″E
- Type: Reservoir
- Basin countries: Singapore
- Surface area: 0.88 km^{2} (0.34 sq mi)
- Average depth: 9 m (30 ft)
- Max. depth: 18.2 m (60 ft)
- Shore length^{1}: 5.8 m (19 ft)
- ^{1} Shore length is not a well-defined measure.

Bedok Reservoir (Malay: Empangan Bedok, Chinese: 勿洛蓄水池; pinyin: Wùluò Xùshuǐchí, Tamil: பெடோக் நீர்த்தேக்கம்) is a reservoir in the eastern part of Singapore, to the north of Bedok. The reservoir has a surface area of 880,000 m^{2}, and a capacity of 12.8 million m^{3}. The mean depth of the reservoir is 9 m, with a maximum depth of 18.2 m. The shoreline length is 4.3 km.

== History ==
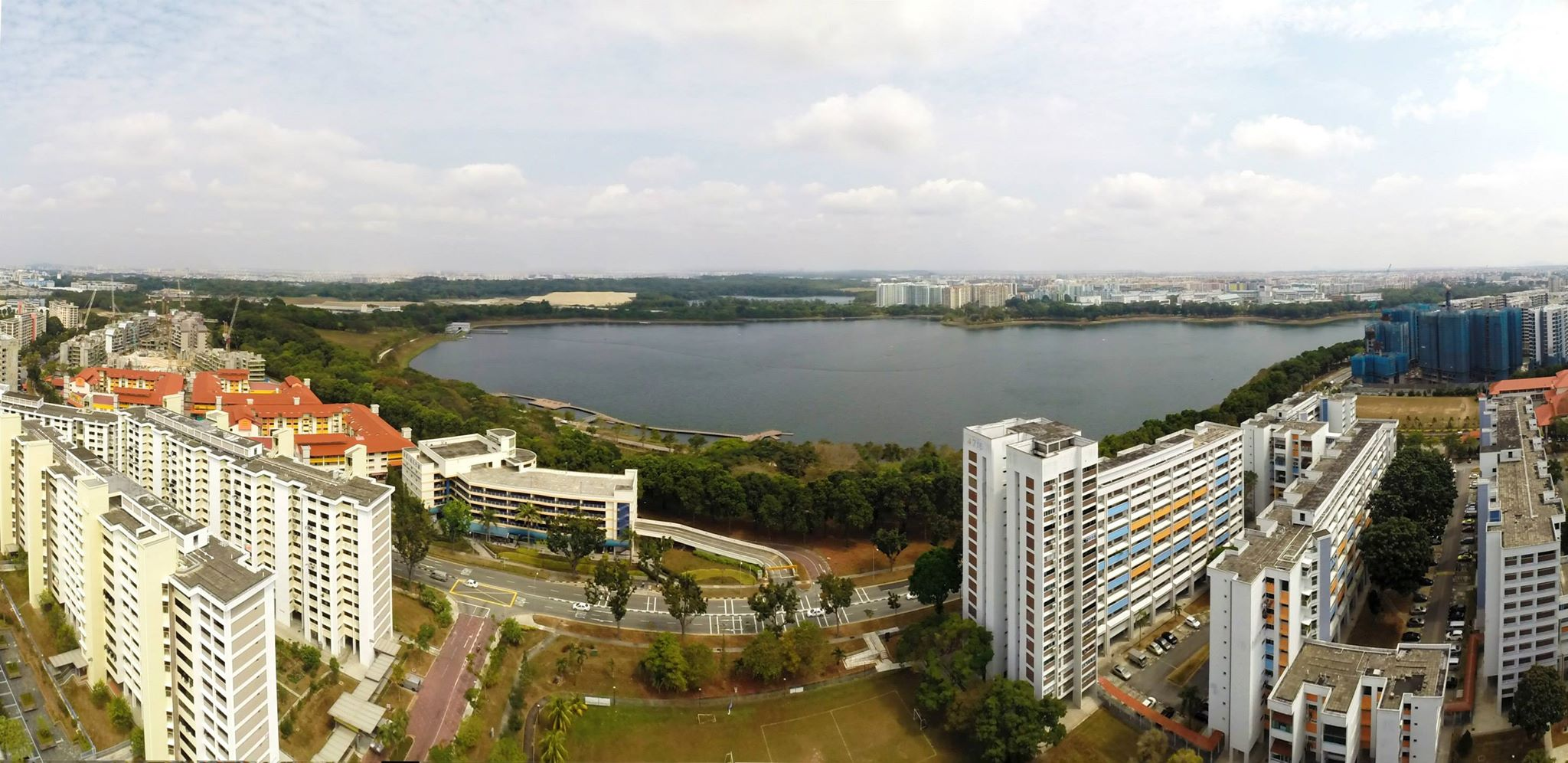
Aerial perspective of Bedok Reservoir. Shot in 2014.

The reservoir was first announced in 1980 as part of a water supply scheme. It was converted from a sand quarry that was used by the Housing and Development Board (HDB). Construction of the reservoir began in 1983, with the construction of a deep pumping station and a perimeter road. The reservoir was completed in June 1985, and it began operations later that year.

== Reservoir ==
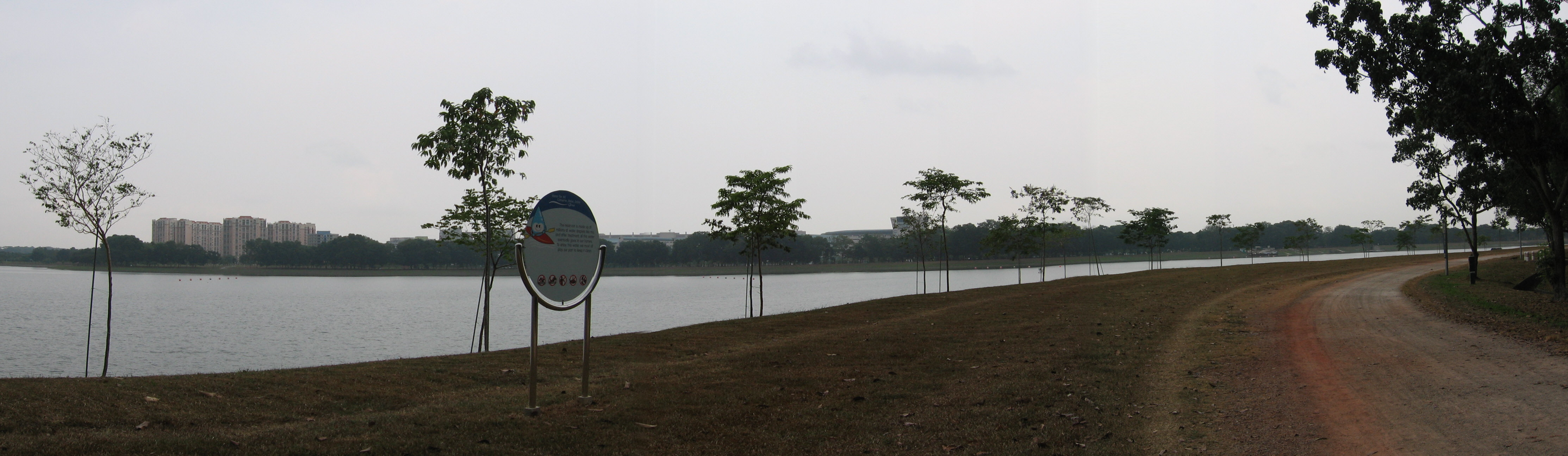
Bedok Reservoir

Bedok Reservoir is now open to water sports activities such as wakeboarding, sailing, Forest Adventure fishing, canoeing and kayaking. This follows the Singapore Sports Council's (SSC's) efforts to allow water sport enthusiasts to make use of the various reservoirs for activities which do not compromise the quality of the water. The programme kicked off with the HSBC Wakeboard World Cup Singapore 2004, held at Bedok Reservoir on 30–31 October 2004 and this was the first international water sports event to be held at a local reservoir.

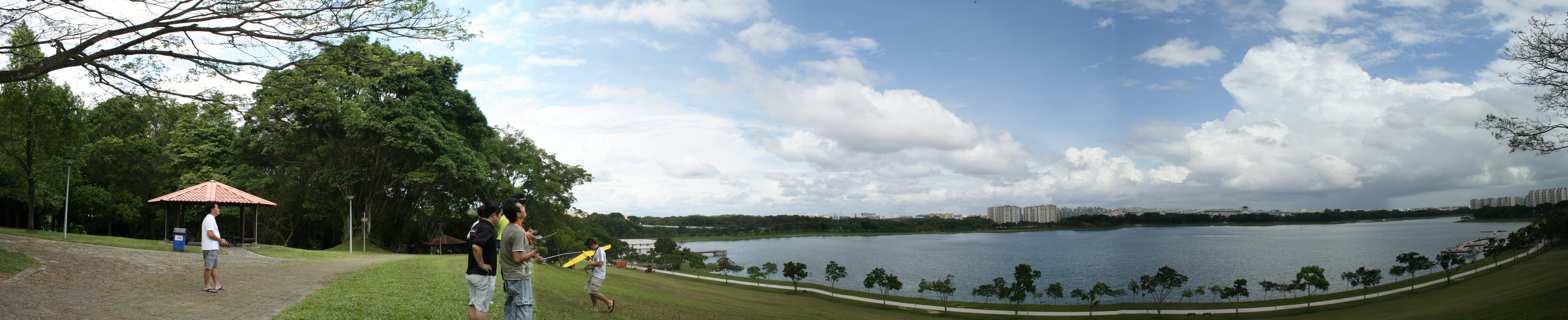
Flying model gliders at Bedok Reservoir

The hill on the west part of Bedok Reservoir is a popular place to fly model gliders.

== Bedok Reservoir Park ==
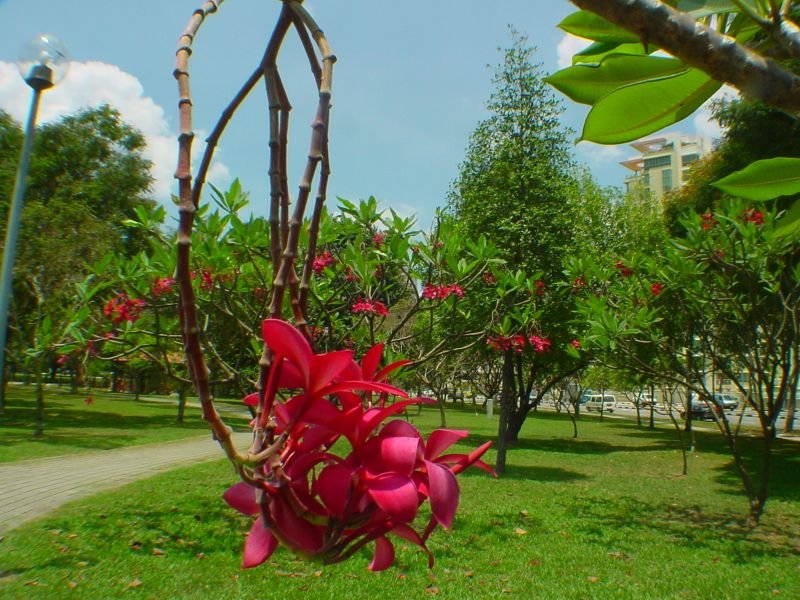
Red frangipani (Plumeria rubra) in Bedok Reservoir Park

The Bedok Reservoir Park was developed around the reservoir. The park is equipped with a jogging track, a children's playground, fitness stations and open fields. The park is popular for outdoor activities like inline skating, cycling, fishing and jogging. Jog A Walk Activities are held regularly at the park by schools and organisations.

Bedok Reservoir Park is also home to Forest Adventure, the largest tree top adventure park in Singapore. It comprises series of 69 obstacles at height and 4 giant zip lines over the water.

The park has six venues that can be booked for private events: the Floating Deck (area of 1,320 sq.m, capacity of up to 240 people.), Activity Lawn (area of 3600 sq m, capacity of up to 2,000 persons), Jogging Track (4.3 kilometres long), Reservoir Vista (area of 3,600 sq.m, capacity of up to 2,000 persons), Reservoir Lawn (area of 13,200 sq. m, capacity of up to 5000 persons) and Viewing Gallery (area of 432 sq.m, capacity of up to 150 persons). The park is accessible via Bedok Reservoir Road. The current tenants are Forest Adventure and WAWAWA - Bistro by The Reservoir. The park has been designated with the code 9V-0004 by the international Parks On The Air award program, and so is regularly 'activated' by Amateur Radio operators using portable equipment.

=== Access ===
Bedok Reservoir MRT station, to the south-east at Bedok North Avenue 3, is the nearest station on the MRT network.

Bedok Reservoir Park is well-connected by the Park Connector Network, being part of the Eastern Coastal Loop which provides traffic-free connections to East Coast Park and Tampines.

== Events ==
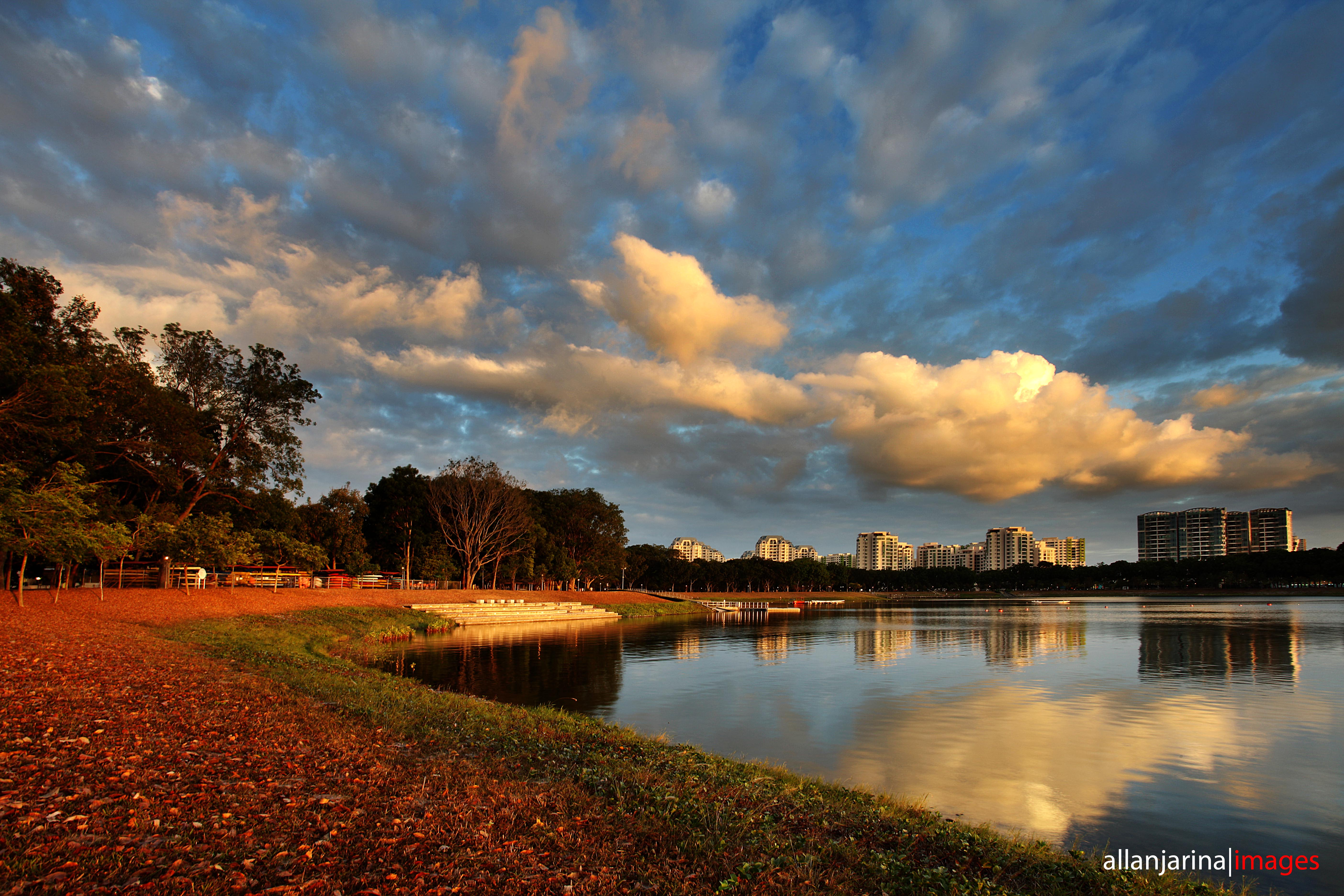
Bedok Reservoir during the Northeast Monsoon

The Launch of Water Sports Activity was held on 17 October 2004. It marked the first time water activities could be held in a local reservoir. The Guest of Honour, George Yeo (former Minister of Foreign Affairs and MP for Aljunied GRC) flagged off canoe racing during the event.

The HSBC Wakeboard World Cup Singapore 2004, was held at Bedok Reservoir on 30–31 October 2004. This was the first international water sports event to be held at a local reservoir.

The Wakeboard World Cup Singapore 2007 was held on 22 and 23 September 2007 during the Singapore leg of the World Cup Series. It stopped at Russia and Ireland first before ending at Qatar. It was organised by the Singapore Waterski & Wakeboard Federation.

The world premier of Hydro Sapiens by The Lunatics was held from 20 to 22 June 2008 as part of the Singapore Arts Festival. The Singapore Dragon Boat Festival was held from 28 to 29 June 2008.

The weekly Saturday parkrun takes place at Bedok Reservoir. Organized by volunteers, the 5km run welcomes all runners with all fitness levels.

== Incident ==
On 25 October 2011, the body of a woman believed to be in her late 50s was found floating in Bedok Reservoir, the fifth body recovered from the reservoir within a five-month period. The body was discovered by a jogger at about 7:10 a.m. and was pronounced dead at the scene by Singapore Civil Defence Force paramedics. The Singapore Police Force classified the case as an unnatural death and commenced investigations. The discovery followed the earlier recoveries of the bodies of Lin Xiao, Raman Selvam, and Tan Sze Sze and her three-year-old son, attracting public attention due to the series of deaths at the reservoir in 2011.

In September 2014, a Temasek Polytechnic student was practicing kayaking in Bedok Reservoir when his boat capsized, making him fall into the water. Immediately after falling into the water, he felt fish biting his feet. He then swam to a nearby pontoon and had gaping cuts around his toes on his right foot after reaching the pontoon. Biologists claimed that the cuts could be caused by attacks from aggressive turtles or fish in the reservoir. However, more attacks of the same kind were reported over the next three months. As a result, sporting and recreational activities were suspended at Bedok Reservoir from 17 December 2014 to 16 January 2015. During the suspension, several types of predatory fish not indigenous to Singapore were caught, including African walking catfish, peacock bass, tarpon, armoured sucker catfish and giant snakehead. As the invasive fish species were not native to Singapore, they were likely illegally released into the reservoir. The government has issued advisories to those entering the waters, and severe fines and penalties have been imposed for those releasing fish here.
